= William M. Ellinghaus =

American business executive (1922–2022)

- Born: William Maurice Ellinghaus; April 19, 1922; Baltimore, Maryland, U.S.
- Died: January 4, 2022 (aged 99); Bronxville, New York, U.S.
- Occupation: Business executive
- Employer: AT&T
- Spouses: Erlaine Dietrich (m. 1942; died 2008) Ruth Kelly Miller (m. 2010)
- Children: 8

William Maurice Ellinghaus (April 19, 1922 – January 4, 2022) was an American business executive who had served as the president and chief operating officer of the American multinational company AT&T. He was the president of the company during its breakup in the 1980s as a settlement to a United States Department of Justice led antitrust case United States v. AT&T. He also served in New York's Emergency Financial Control Board in the 1970s helping the city through a fiscal crisis and preventing a default.

== Early life ==
Ellinghaus was born on April 19, 1922, in Baltimore, Maryland, to Medora (née Watkins) and N. Andrew Ellinghaus. He was the second of three siblings. His father worked with the Chesapeake & Potomac Telephone Company. Ellinghaus grew up in Baltimore and studied at the Forest Park High School and graduated from the school in 1940. He served in the United States Navy as a reserve sonarman between 1943 and 1945.

== Career ==
Ellinghaus started his career with the Chesapeake & Potomac Telephone Company of Maryland as a phone-installer. He went on to become the company's vice president in 1960 before joining AT&T as a vice president of the New York Telephone Company. He became president of New York Telephone in 1970 and a vice chairman of AT&T in 1976.

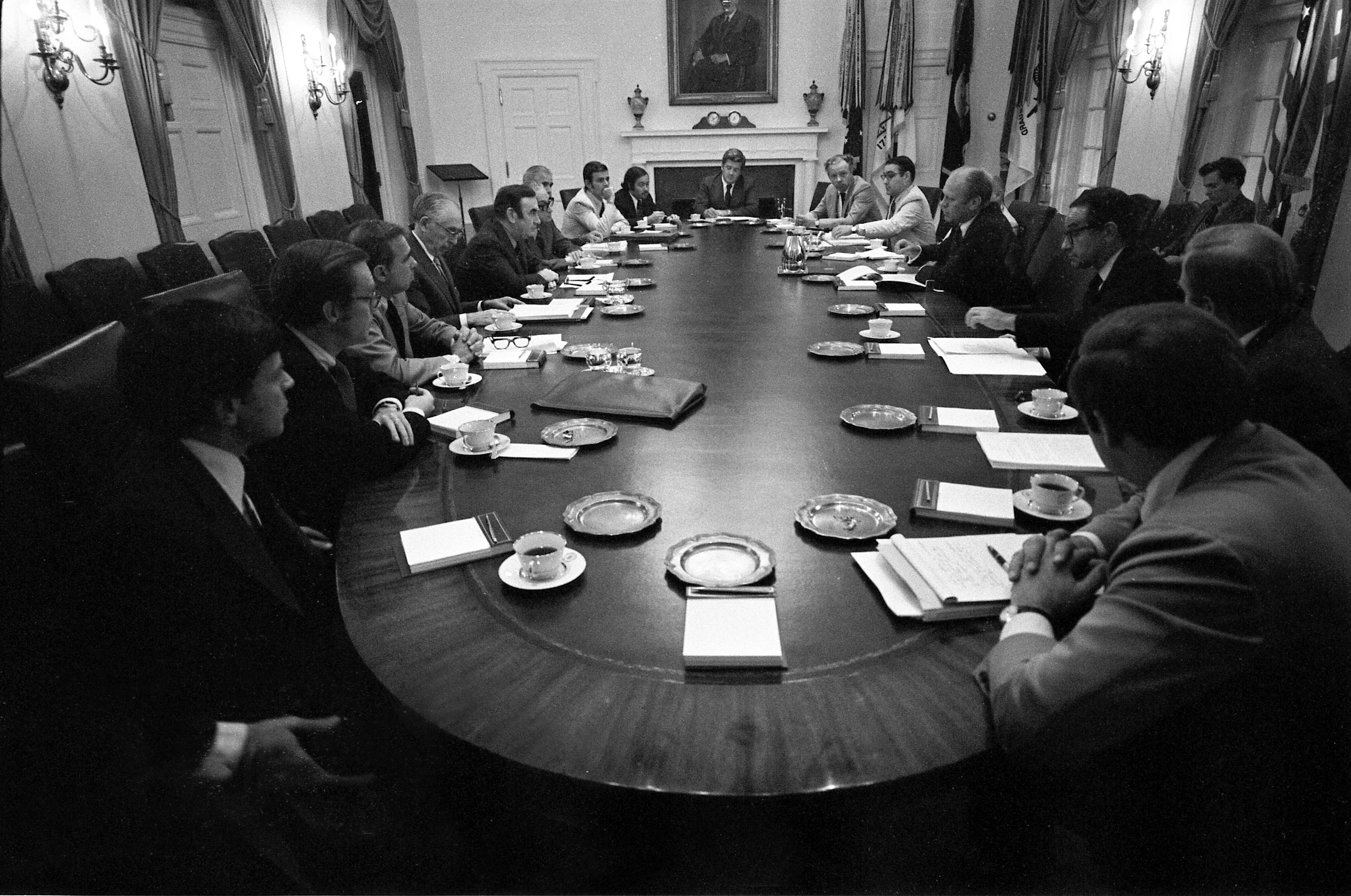
Ellinghaus with president Gerald Ford, governor Hugh Carey, and other officials discussing New York's financial situation (1975)

He became AT&T's president and chief operating officer in February 1979. As a president of the company he oversaw the company's breakup in the early 1980s when AT&T's regional Bell System was disinvested into independent telephone companies as a settlement for United States Department of Justice led antitrust case United States v. AT&T. After a career spanning 44 years, he retired in 1984. During his time at the company he was known as a 'trouble-shooter' resolving among other events, a New York telephone workers' strike in 1971 that brought installation works to a standstill for many weeks, restoration of service after a major fire at the company's switching center in Manhattan, and various rate negotiations with the state of New York.

Earlier, in 1975, he was made the chairman of the New York Municipal Assistance Corporation, and later a member of the Emergency Financial Control Board. Along with others including American investment banker Felix Rohatyn, he was drafted by the then governor Hugh Carey to help rescue New York through a fiscal crisis. The city was running a huge budget deficit with reduced tax earnings resulting in low cash supply for driving its operating expenses. When a federal bailout plea was rejected, the group took over the city's fiscal management. The group imposed cuts in city services spending and eventually led the city out of the fiscal crisis and from default.

Ellinghaus also served as the executive vice-president of the New York Stock Exchange between 1984 and 1986, and the chairman of the New York area PBS station WNET (also referred to as Channel Thirteen) between 1984 and 1990. He was also appointed the United States' chairman for the United Nations Day in 1983 by the then president Ronald Reagan. Ellinghaus was also the head of the National Arts Stabilization Fund which provided grants to various arts groups.

== Personal life ==
Ellinghaus married his high school classmate Erlaine (née Dietrich) in 1942. They had eight children and were married until her death in 2008. He then married Ruth Kelly Miller in 2010. Ellinghaus died at his home in Bronxville, New York, on January 4, 2022, at the age of 99.

== See also ==
- Breakup of the Bell System
- United States v. AT&T
- New York City Financial Crisis of 1975
