= Nevada Bell =

U.S. state telephone provider

AT&T Nevada
- Company type: Subsidiary
- Industry: Telecommunications
- Founded: 1913; 113 years ago
- Headquarters: Reno, Nevada, United States
- Key people: Stephanie Tyler-Jackson, President
- Products: POTS, DSL, U-Verse (FTTN)
- Number of employees: 850
- Parent: Pacific Telesis (1983-1997); Ameritech (1997-1999); SBC Communications Inc. (1999-2005); AT&T Inc. (2005-present)

The Nevada Bell Telephone Company, originally Bell Telephone Company of Nevada, is a Nevada telephone provider and it was the Bell System's telephone provider in Nevada. It only provides telephone services to 30% of the state, essentially all of the state outside Las Vegas, where service is provided by Lumen Technologies. Nevada Bell spent nearly all its history as a subsidiary of Pacific Bell, which is the reason Nevada Bell was not listed in Judge Harold H. Greene's Modification of Final Judgment starting the breakup of the Bell System.

== History ==
Nevada Bell Logo

Nevada Bell traces its history to 1906, when Pacific Telephone and Telegraph – forerunner of Pacific Bell – bought the Sunset Telephone and Telegraph Company, one of several early telephone companies in Nevada. In 1913, Pacific Telephone transferred its Nevada operations to the newly formed Bell Telephone Company of Nevada. After the 1984 breakup, its legal name was shortened to Nevada Bell (its popular name for the better part of its history), and it became an operating company of Pacific Telesis alongside Pacific Bell.

== Mergers ==
In 1997, Pacific Telesis Group was acquired by SBC Communications. The Pacific Telesis corporate name disappeared fairly quickly although SBC continued to operate the local telephone companies separately under their original names.

Nevada Bell logo, 2001-2002

In September 2001, SBC rebranded the telephone company "SBC Nevada Bell". In late 2002, the Nevada Bell name disappeared altogether when SBC rebranded all of its operating companies as simply "SBC". However, for legal and regulatory purposes, employees supporting local regulated services were still employed by "Nevada Bell dba SBC Nevada", which was the SBC subsidiary that provided regulated local telephone services within the franchise territory in Nevada.

On November 18, 2005, SBC completed its acquisition of AT&T Corp. to form AT&T Inc., at which point Nevada Bell began doing business as AT&T Nevada.
