= Pacific Bell =

Telephone company in California

Pacific Bell Telephone Company
- Trade name: AT&T California
- Formerly: The Pacific Telephone and Telegraph Company (1906–1983)
- Type: Subsidiary
- Industry: Telecommunications
- Founded: 1906; 120 years ago
- Headquarters: San Francisco, California, United States
- Area served: California
- Products: POTS, DSL
- Parent: AT&T Corporation (1906–1983); Pacific Telesis (1984–1997); AT&T (1997–present)
- Subsidiaries: Nevada Bell

The Pacific Bell Telephone Company (Pac Bell) doing business as AT&T California is a telephone company that provides telephone service in California. The company is owned by AT&T through AT&T Teleholdings, and, though separate, is now marketed as “AT&T”. The company has been known by a number of names during which its service area has changed. The formal name of the company from the 1910s through the 1984 Bell System divestiture was The Pacific Telephone and Telegraph Company. The “Pacific Bell” was phased out of public use in 2002, although it remains the legal name of AT&T's local operating company in California and is still the holder of record for the infrastructure of cables and fiber through much of California.

== History ==
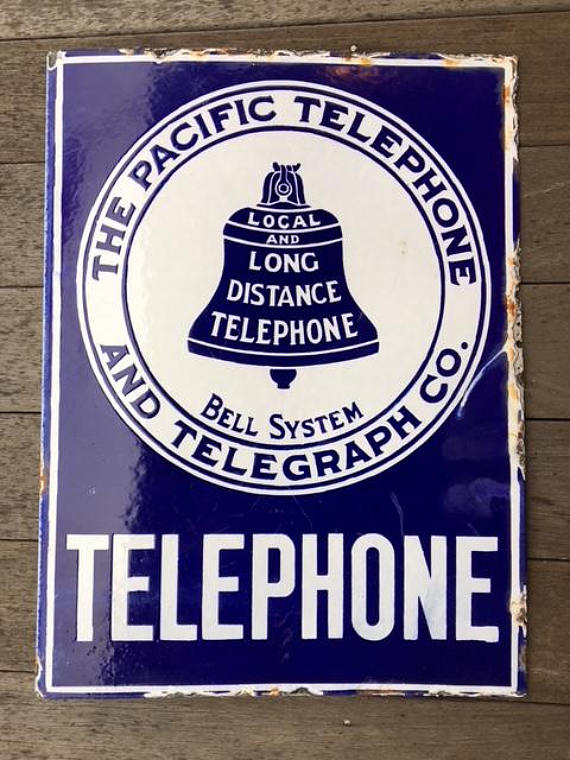
Pacific Telephone logo used from 1908 to 1921

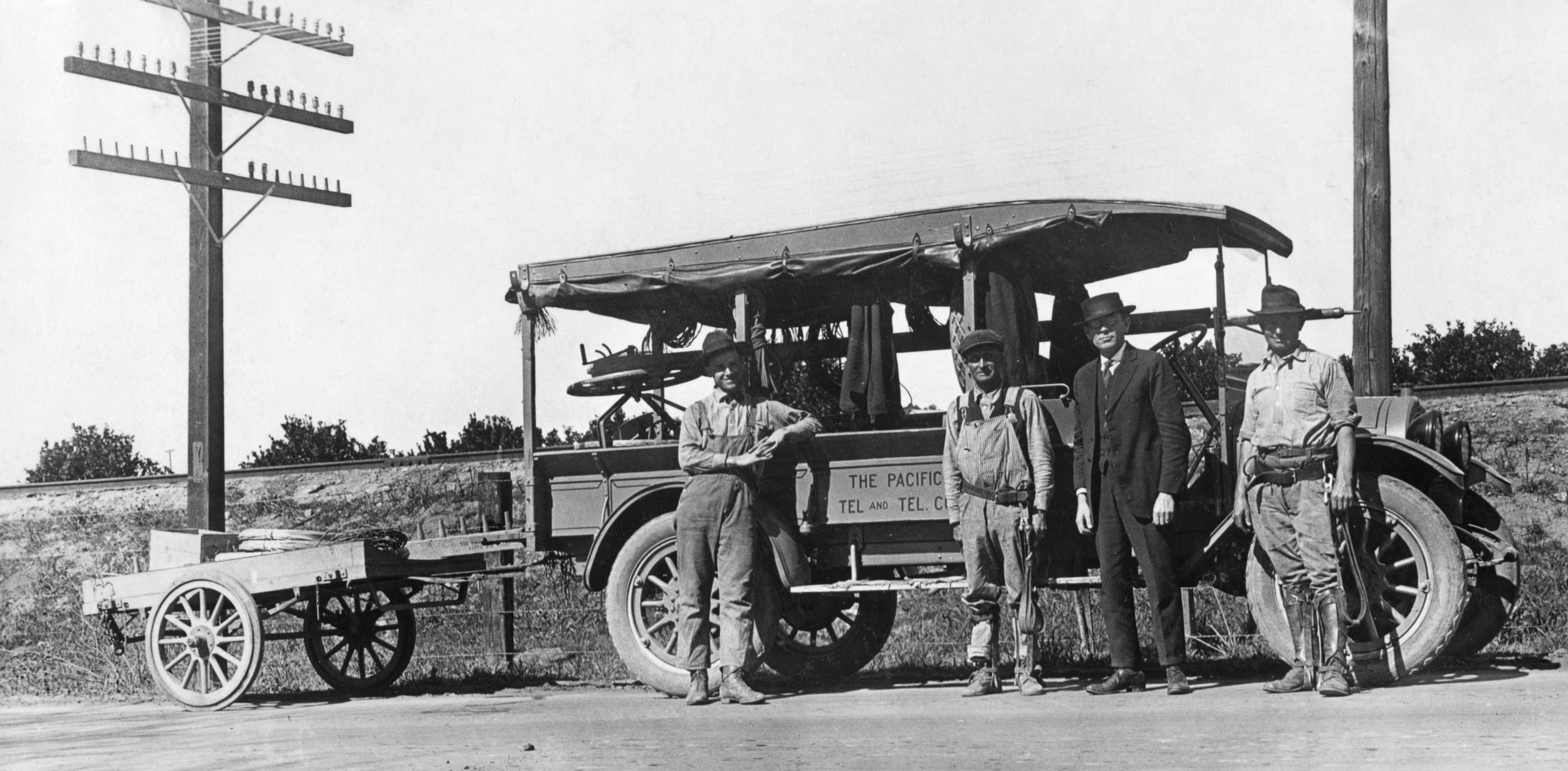
Pacific Telephone and Telegraph Co. service crew, Feb. 1921

The Pacific Telephone and Telegraph Company, or "PacTel" for short, managed the Bell System's telephone operations in California. It grew by acquiring smaller telephone companies along the Pacific coast. It built and occupied San Francisco's Pacific Telephone Building on New Montgomery Street which has been described as a "monument to western progress and foresight".

=== San Francisco graft ===
During the San Francisco graft trials, the company was implicated in paying bribes to obtain an operations franchise in San Francisco. Theodore Halsey, a confidential political agent for the Pacific States Telephone and Telegraph Company, paid attorney Abe Ruef a retainer of $1,250 a month for "advice" on municipal issues. Ruef was the political boss behind S.F. Mayor Eugene Schmitz. In 1906, San Francisco was one of the most promising places for investment in all of the United States. Many companies were vying for a piece of the money to be made. The city's supervisors had run on a platform that included the city acquiring its own telephone system which both Home Telephone Company and Pacific States Telephone and Telegraph Company wanted to prevent. The Home Telephone Company, financed by investors from Southern California and Ohio, was trying to wrest the telephone franchise held exclusively by Pacific States Telephone and Telegraph Company in Northern California.

After the massive earthquake of 1906, the Home Telephone Company contributed $75,000 to a relief fund for the city, but asked that it be held until their franchise was approved. It was later revealed that the city's supervisors had received payoffs through Ruef from both the Home Telephone Company and Pacific States Telephone Co. Home Telephone paid 10 supervisors $3,500 each and seven supervisors $6,000 each (about $130000 to $210,000 in 2025). Pacific States Telephone Co. paid 10 supervisors $5,000 each ($180000 in 2025). After the graft prosecutions, E.F. Pillsbury, General Counsel for the telephone company, revealed that he had never heard of Ruef's employment, and would have objected to Ruef receiving compensation greater than his own $1,000 per month.

=== Growth ===
During the first part of the 20th century, Pacific Telephone & Telegraph, along with the rest of the Bell System, initially resisted automating its services, on the premise that its people could provide better service than machines. When it acquired competing providers, if the company provided automatic dial service, Bell removed the automatic equipment and replaced it with manual telephones and manual operator switchboards. The company soon realized its best manual systems were unable to keep up with the growing demand for telephone service. In the early 1920s, following the 1921 installation of the nation's first large panel switch in Omaha, the Bell operating companies began to install automated switching equipment.

=== Southern California service ===
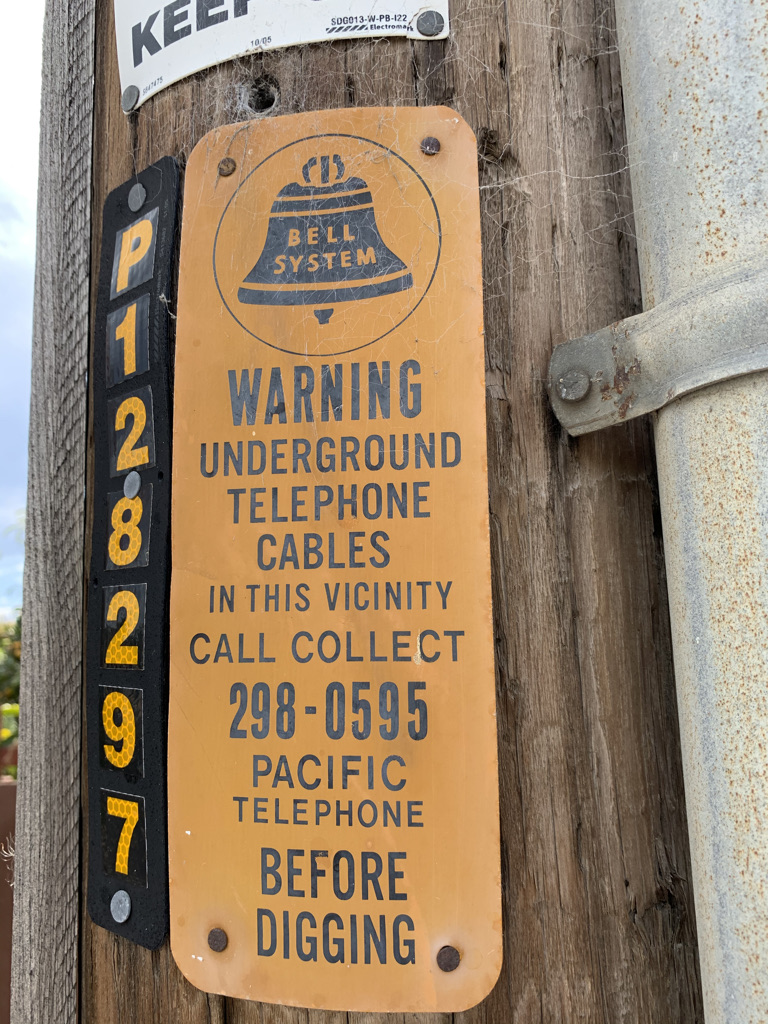
Pacific Telephone "Call Before You Dig" notice (pre-1984 version)

Los Angeles and San Francisco employed different approaches for adopting new automatic switching technology. The Los Angeles Telephone Co. had merged with the Sunset Telephone Co. of northern California in 1883. Sunset was subsequently acquired by Pacific Telephone & Telegraph Co. in 1906. Following the purchase by PacTel, the southern California company remained a separate operation and used the Sunset name.

The Los Angeles area was also served by a competitor, The Home Telephone Co., which began offering automatic (dial) service in 1902. The Sunset Telephone Co. subscribers were able to make local and long-distance calls via the Bell System, but Home Telephone Co. customers could make only local calls to other Home customers. To reach both exchanges, businesses were required to pay for a line from each company. In 1916, under pressure from local politicians and subscribers, Sunset Telephone Co. agreed to acquire the Home Company's operations. The new entity was called The Southern California Telephone Co. The two companies' operations were fully integrated in 1918.

At the time of the 1918 merger, Home had 60,000 customers served from 16 dial offices. Sunset had 68,000 subscribers served from nine manual offices. Home's operations were sizable and the public felt Home provided better service than Sunset, so Pacific Telephone didn't convert the dial offices to manual as it had in the past. Instead, it took the highly unusual step of adding a dial and trunk lines to every manual switchboard position. In this way, former Sunset customers could reach the former Home subscribers via their central office operator.

The last Los Angeles manual exchange was Thornwall 6, in Burbank, which operated until the late 1950s. The last manual office in southern California was in Avalon, on Catalina Island, dating from a radiotelephone service installed in the early 1920s. Pacific Telephone later laid two submarine cables to link the island to the mainland. Avalon was converted to dial in 1978, using switching equipment 23 miles away in the San Pedro central office.

=== Northern California operations ===
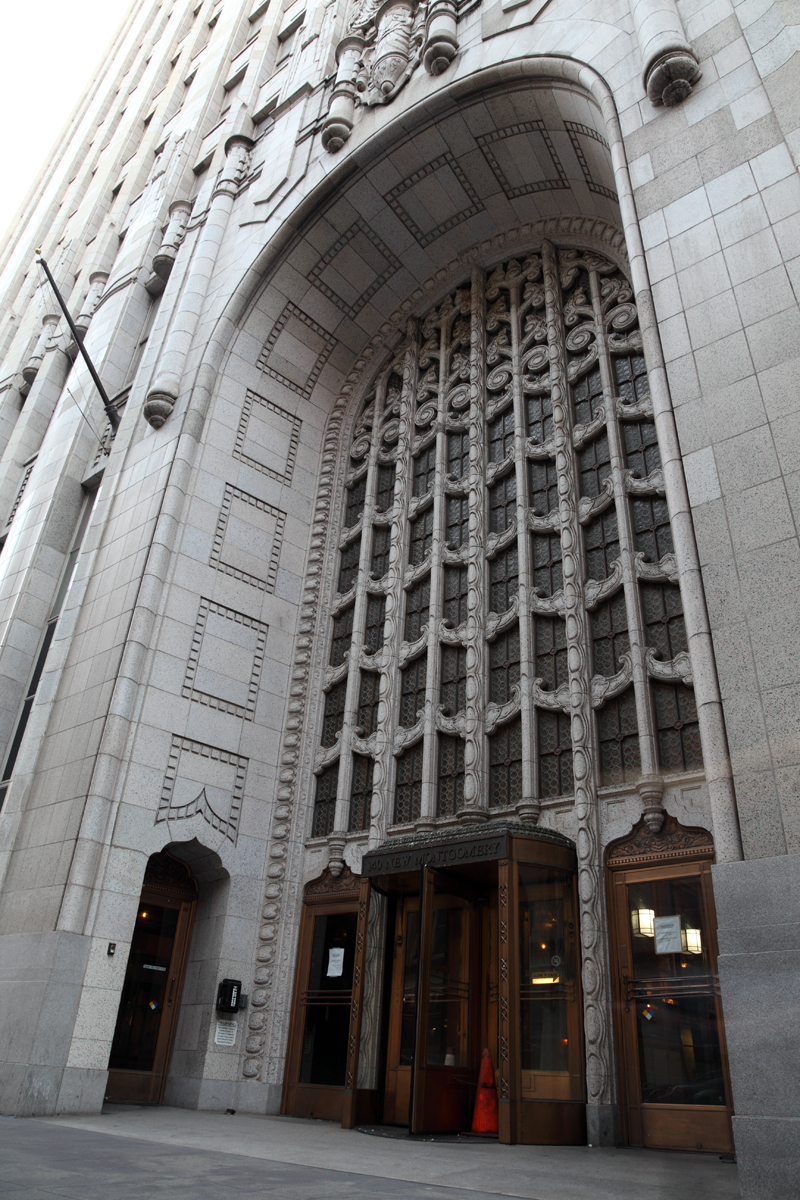
PacBell Building, San Francisco

San Francisco continued to install manual offices throughout the 1920s. When PacTel took over the operations of its San Francisco and Oakland competitor, Home Telephone Co., in the early 1920s, its customers were switched from Home's dial service to Pacific Telephone manual exchanges. A 1927 Pacific Telephone & Telegraph Co. publication proudly describes the company's newest manual offices, without a word of plans to introduce dial service. San Francisco's first dial office, ORdway, opened on March 23, 1929. The first suburban step-by-step (electromechanical stepping switch) office opened in Palo Alto in 1929.

=== Dial service conversion ===
Telephone service conversion from manual to dial systems was slowed by equipment shortages during World War II. San Jose had been planned for conversion before the war, but remained on manual service until 1949.

In preparation for Operator Toll Dialing, the precursor to customer DDD (Direct Distance Dialling), cities throughout the country converted telephone numbers to a standardized 2L-5N format, e.g. EXchange 1-2345. San Francisco completed its conversion in December 1947. In July 1948, Pacific Telephone converted most of the cities on the San Francisco Peninsula. The company announcement, "most Peninsula cities now have exchange names" confirmed that the old four- or five-digit numbers had been converted to the seven-digit exchange format.

- DAvenport 2 - Palo Alto
- OXford - Millbrae
- DIamond 3 & 4 - Burlingame, San Mateo
- FIreside 5 - San Mateo
- EMerson 6 - Redwood City

Manual numbers were still used in some peninsula cities and were listed in the directory without the first two letters of the name capitalized, indicating a non-dialable point requiring operator assistance to reach. For example:

- Belmont 120
- San Carlos 932-J
- Pescadero 2349-R
- Half Moon Bay 3497
- San Gregorio 2

To place calls to certain other Northern California exchanges, such as Sacramento, Stockton, and Vallejo in Northern California, dial customers would dial "0" to reach an operator. The operator dialed through a tandem switch and directly called numbers in those cities. These calls were indicated by a star in the telephone directory. For other call destinations, customers dialed "211" to reach a long-distance operator, who would connect the customer using manual trunks to reach a distant operator.

When Pacific Telephone converted its San Francisco operations to 2L-5N calling in 1947, the old central office names were kept in most cases, with an extra digit appended. Certain exchanges were abandoned after being converted from manual service, such as WEst, RAndolph, and the famous CHina exchange of Chinatown. The manual 25th Street office in San Francisco, serving the MIssion, ATwater, and VAlencia exchanges, was converted to dial in 1952. On September 6, 1953, JUniper 6, previously known as RAndolph in the 2L-4N era, the last manual office within the City and County, cut over its 2,700 subscribers to crossbar equipment in the new Juniper central office on Onondaga Avenue.

Riverside maintained a large manual office until 1956. Berkeley converted AShberry 3, its last manual office, to dial in 1963. Crockett, the final Bay Area manual office, was converted to dial in 1969.

=== Northwest acquisitions ===
Acquisitions over the years extended Pacific Telephone's territory into Oregon, Washington, and northern Idaho. Those operations were split off on July 1, 1961, to form Pacific Northwest Bell. In the 1980s, Pacific Telephone's assets were valued at $14.5 billion, making it the largest of any of the 22 wholly owned local Bell operating companies of AT&T, which also made Pacific Telephone the "crown jewel" of the operating companies. However, Pacific Telephone was one of the least profitable Bells due to very tough local telephone regulations in California.

=== Separation from AT&T ===
Pacific Bell logo, 1984–1997

Prior to the AT&T breakup in 1984, AT&T held 89.8% of Pacific Telephone. After the breakup, The Pacific Telephone and Telegraph Company changed its name to Pacific Bell Telephone Company, or PacBell for short. Pacific Telesis was formed as a holding company for PacBell's interests, with PacBell and Nevada Bell (which PacBell had owned since 1913) as its operating companies. Since Nevada Bell had long been a PacBell subsidiary, that company was omitted from the Modification of Final Judgment that broke up the Bell System.

== Mergers and subsequent growth ==
In 1997, Pacific Telesis Group was acquired by SBC Communications, and although the Pacific Telesis corporate name disappeared fairly quickly with many reported family shareholders selling and converting major equity stakes, SBC continued to operate the local telephone companies separately under their original names.

Pacific Bell logo, 1999-2001

In September 2001, SBC rebranded the telephone company "SBC Pacific Bell". In late 2002, the companies were rebranded again as "SBC". Meanwhile, employees of SBC working in California who support SBC's non-regulated services and/or services provided both within and outside California were transferred to other SBC subsidiaries, like "Pacific Telesis Shared Services" and "SBC Operations, Inc." However, for legal and regulatory purposes, employees supporting local regulated services were still employed by "Pacific Bell Telephone Company dba SBC California ("SBC California")" which is the SBC subsidiary that provides regulated local exchange carrier telephone services within the franchise territory in California.

Pacific Bell logo, 2001-2002

On November 18, 2005, SBC completed its acquisition of AT&T Corp. to form AT&T Inc. Pacific Bell is now known as "Pacific Bell Telephone Company", dba AT&T California. In 2006, the company's direct parent, originally Ameritech, became AT&T Teleholdings due to an internal reorganization at AT&T. Its former direct parent, Pacific Telesis Group, was legally merged into AT&T Teleholdings, while a majority of the original Bell family shares were sold. In 2007, local telephone service in California was further deregulated, resulting in price increases for AT&T California customers.

== See also ==
- List of United States telephone companies
- Pacific Bell Telephone Co. v. linkLine Communications, Inc.
- Pacific Bell Wireless
- Pacific Bell Directory
- Pacific Northwest Bell
- Regional Bell Operating Company
- Telephone in United States history
