= Harold H. Greene =

American judge (1923–2000)

Harold Herman Greene
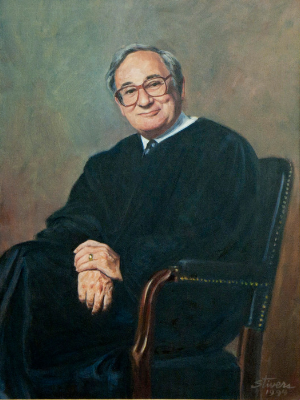
- Official portrait, 1994

Senior Judge of the United States District Court for the District of Columbia
- In office August 6, 1995 – January 29, 2000

Judge of the United States District Court for the District of Columbia
- In office May 19, 1978 – August 6, 1995
- Appointed by: Jimmy Carter
- Preceded by: John Sirica
- Succeeded by: Colleen Kollar-Kotelly

Personal details
- Born: Heinz Grünhaus; February 6, 1923 Frankfurt, Germany
- Died: January 29, 2000 (aged 76) Washington, D.C., U.S.
- Education: George Washington University (BA, JD)

Harold Herman Greene (born Heinz Grünhaus; February 6, 1923 – January 29, 2000) was a United States district judge of the United States District Court for the District of Columbia.

== Early life and education ==
Greene was born Heinz Grünhaus in Frankfurt, Germany. In 1939, his family, who were Jewish, fled the Nazi regime to Belgium, Vichy France, Portugal, and finally the United States in 1943, during World War II.

Once in the U.S., Greene enlisted in the United States Army and interrogated German prisoners for U.S. military intelligence.

He received his Bachelor of Arts degree in 1949 from George Washington University and his J.D. in 1952 from George Washington University Law School.

== Career ==
From 1952 to 1953, Greene was a law clerk for Judge Bennett Champ Clark of the United States Court of Appeals for the District of Columbia Circuit. He subsequently served as an Assistant United States Attorney for the District of Columbia until 1957 and chief of appeals research for the United States Department of Justice Civil Rights Division from 1957 to 1965.

At the U.S. Justice Department, Greene helped develop the Civil Rights Act of 1964 and Voting Rights Act of 1965. Greene was a judge of the Court of General Sessions in Washington, D.C. from 1956 to 1966, Chief Judge of that court until 1971, and Chief Judge of the Superior Court of the District of Columbia from 1971 to 1978.

=== U.S. District Court ===
Greene was nominated by President Jimmy Carter on March 22, 1978, to a seat on the United States District Court for the District of Columbia vacated by Judge John Sirica. He was confirmed by the United States Senate on May 17, 1978, and received his commission on May 19, 1978. He assumed senior status on August 6, 1995. His service was terminated on January 29, 2000, due to his death in Washington, D.C.

==== Notable cases ====
- In 1982, Greene presided over United States v. AT&T, the antitrust suit that broke up the AT&T vertical market monopoly on the telecommunications industry in the United States. The case, one of Greene's first after being named to the bench, resulted in the 1982 consent decree between AT&T and the Federal Trade Commission. It was later amended and in a Modification of Final Judgment, resulting in the Bell System divestiture, AT&T's spin off of the seven Regional Bell Operating companies. The case freed AT&T to enter the computer industry, from which it had previously been barred.
- In 1990, he presided over the 1990 trial of Admiral Poindexter. This was the first time that any former president (Reagan) testified about his own conduct in office in connection with a criminal trial.
- In 1990, he sentenced the 1983 United States Senate bombing suspects, Laura Whitehorn and Linda Evans, to prison.

== Death ==
On January 29, 2000, Greene died from a cerebral hemorrhage during a brain operation in Washington, D.C.

== Legacy ==
Greene was survived by his wife, Evelyn, and two children: son Dr. Michael D. Greene and daughter Stephanie Cavagrotti.

After his death, the George Washington University Law School created the Harold H. Greene Professor of Law endowed chair in his memory. The chair was established by an endowment gift of $1.5 million from telecommunications entrepreneurs David and Maria Wiegand of Orange County, California, owners of Pathfinder Communications at the time.

== See also ==
- List of Jewish American jurists

Legal offices
Preceded by John Sirica	Judge of the United States District Court for the District of Columbia; 1978–1995	Succeeded by Colleen Kollar-Kotelly
