= Verizon Maryland =

Telecommunications company owned by Verizon

Verizon Maryland LLC
- Formerly: The Chesapeake and Potomac Telephone Company of Baltimore City; The Chesapeake and Potomac Telephone Company of Maryland; Bell Atlantic - Maryland, Inc.
- Type: Subsidiary
- Industry: Telecommunications
- Founded: 1884; 142 years ago
- Headquarters: Baltimore, MD
- Products: Local Telephone Service, Verizon FiOS
- Parent: American Bell (1883-1899); AT&T (1899–1983); Bell Atlantic/Verizon (1984–present)
- Website: Verizon Maryland

Verizon Maryland LLC is a Bell Operating Company owned by Verizon Communications serving the state of Maryland. Its headquarters are in Baltimore.

The company was founded in 1884 as The Chesapeake and Potomac Telephone Company of Baltimore City. It changed its name to The Chesapeake and Potomac Telephone Company of Maryland on January 3, 1956.

After AT&T's 1969 corporate identity overhaul, which included the famous Saul Bass Bell logo, the name was shortened to C&P Telephone on marketing materials, bills, vehicles, etc.

In 1984, when the Bell System was divided into the Regional Bell Operating Companies, or "Baby Bells", the C&P Telephone companies became part of Bell Atlantic.

In 1994, Bell Atlantic renamed all of its operating companies. C&P Telephone of Maryland was renamed Bell Atlantic – Maryland, Inc.

After Bell Atlantic's merger with GTE in 2000, the system was renamed Verizon, and so were its Bell Operating Companies. Bell Atlantic was renamed Verizon Maryland, Inc.

In December 2012, Verizon Maryland, Inc., incorporated in Maryland, was merged into Verizon Maryland Merge Co., a Delaware corporation; the name of the Delaware-based company was then changed to Verizon Maryland LLC.
