= Verizon Delaware =

Delaware subsidiary of Verizon

Verizon Delaware LLC
- Formerly: The Diamond State Telephone Company; Bell Atlantic - Delaware, Inc.
- Company type: Subsidiary of Verizon
- Industry: Telecommunications
- Founded: 1897; 129 years ago
- Headquarters: Wilmington, Delaware
- Area served: Delaware
- Products: Local Telephone Service
- Parent: American Bell (1897-1899); AT&T (1899-1983); Bell Atlantic/Verizon (1984-present)
- Website: Verizon Delaware

Verizon Delaware LLC, formerly The Diamond State Telephone Company, is the Bell Operating Company of Delaware, and small parts of southeastern Pennsylvania. Founded in 1897, it became a part of the Bell System in 1905. When the AT&T breakup occurred in 1984, DST became managed by the Regional Bell Operating Company Bell Atlantic. In 1994, Bell Atlantic chose to "unify" its brand by legally renaming all of its telephone companies, — including Diamond State Telephone to "Bell Atlantic – Delaware, Inc".

After the 2000 merger with GTE, Bell Atlantic – Delaware, Inc. became known as Verizon Delaware, Inc., and later as Verizon Delaware LLC.
