= Bell System =

American telephone service monopoly (1877–1984)

- Final logo designed by Saul Bass
- Industry: Telecommunications
- Founded: 1877; 149 years ago
- Founder: Alexander Graham Bell
- Defunct: January 8, 1984; 42 years ago
- Fate: Breakup of the Bell System
- Successors: Regional Bell Operating Companies; AT&T Corporation
- Headquarters: New York City, U.S.
- Number of employees: +1,000,000
- Parent: Bell Telephone Company (1877–1885); AT&T (1885–1983)

The Bell System was a system of telecommunication companies, led by the Bell Telephone Company and later by the American Telephone and Telegraph Company, that dominated the telephony industry in North America for over 100 years from its creation in 1877 until its antitrust breakup in 1983. The system of companies was often colloquially called Ma Bell (as in "Mother Bell"), as it held a vertical monopoly over telecommunication products and services in most areas of the United States and Canada. At the time of the breakup of the Bell System in the early 1980s, it had assets of $150 billion (equivalent to $460 billion in 2025) and employed over one million people.

Since the 1910s, American antitrust regulators had been observing and accusing the Bell System of abusing its monopoly power and had brought legal action multiple times. In 1974 the Antitrust Division of the U.S. Department of Justice brought a lawsuit against Bell claiming violations of the Sherman Antitrust Act. In 1982, anticipating that it could not win, AT&T agreed to a Justice Department-mandated consent decree that settled the lawsuit and ordered it to separate itself from its local phone companies, who would be broken up into seven "Regional Bell Operating Companies" (known as the "Baby Bells"). This ended the existence of the conglomerate in 1984.

Following the breakup, the Baby Bells were independent companies and several of them became large corporations. However, in wake of the Telecommunications Act of 1996 which removed various restrictions placed on the Baby Bells as part of the breakup, many of them, as well the former parent company, later re-merged. As a result, by 2026 most of the assets and geographical service areas of the former Bell System had been re-assembled into two Baby Bells descendants: AT&T and Verizon.

== History ==
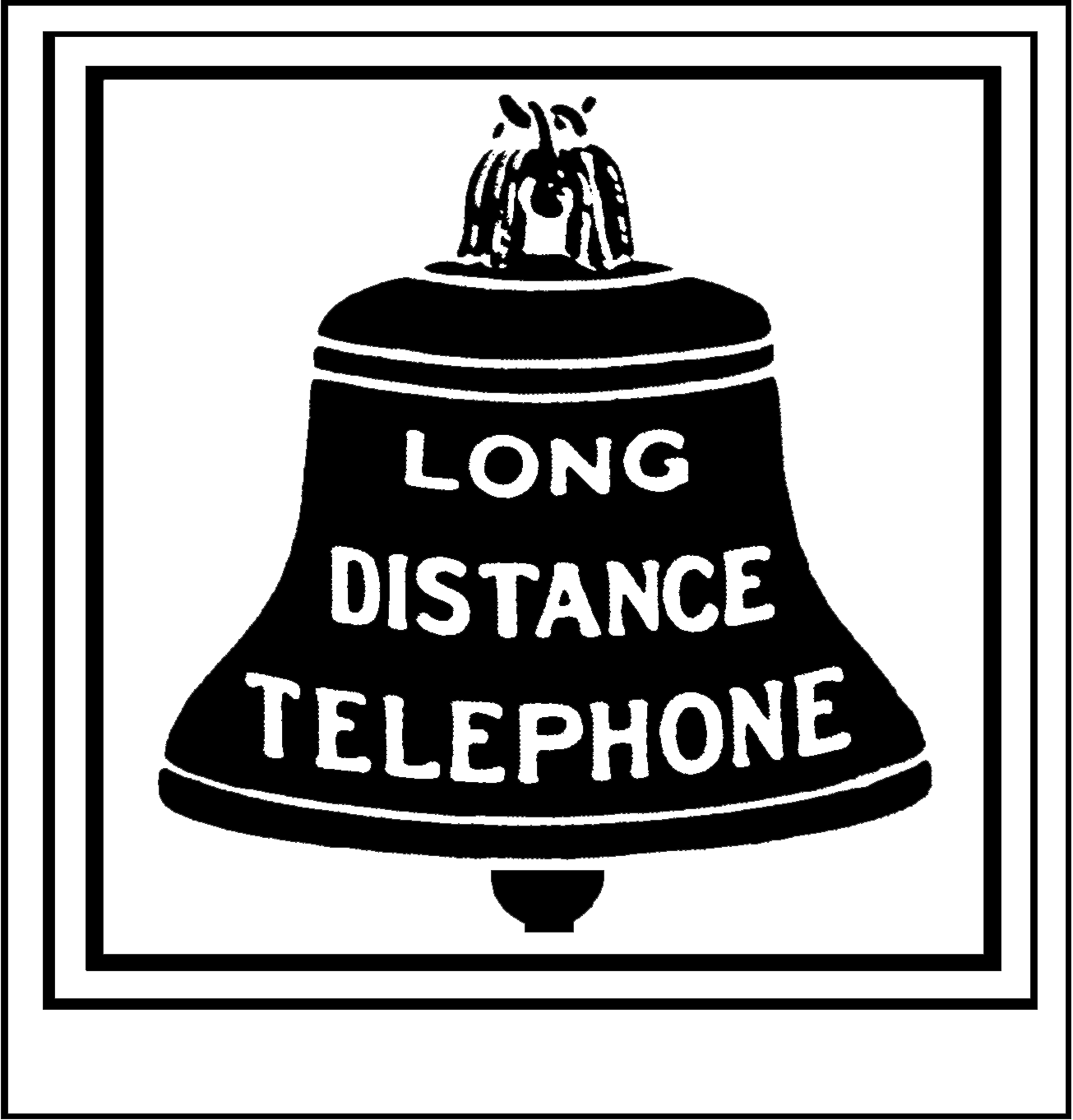
Logo used from 1889 to 1900

In 1877, the American Bell Telephone Company, named after Alexander Graham Bell, opened the first telephone exchange in New Haven, Connecticut. Within a few years local exchange companies were established in every major city in the United States. Use of the Bell System name initially referred to those early telephone franchises and eventually comprised all telephone companies owned by American Telephone & Telegraph, referred to internally as associated companies, regional holding companies, or later Bell operating companies (BOCs).

In 1899, American Telephone & Telegraph (AT&T) acquired the assets of its parent, the American Bell Telephone Company. American Bell had created AT&T to provide long-distance calls between New York and Chicago and beyond. AT&T became the parent of American Bell Telephone Company, and thus the head of the Bell System, because regulatory and tax rules were leaner in New York than in Boston, where American Bell was headquartered. Later, the Bell System and its moniker "Ma Bell" became a term that referred generally to all AT&T companies, of which there were five major divisions:

- AT&T Long Lines, providing long lines to interconnect local exchanges and long-distance calling services, and international lines including submarine cables
- Western Electric Company, Bell's equipment manufacturing arm
- Bell Labs, conducting research and development for AT&T and Western Electric; ownership initially equally split between Western and AT&T
- Bell operating companies, providing local exchange telephone services
- AT&T, the American Telephone and Telegraph company, who led the combined enterprise in planning and finance.

In 1913, the federal government challenged the Bell System's growing monopoly over the phone system under AT&T ownership in an anti-trust suit, leading to the Kingsbury Commitment. Under the commitment, AT&T escaped break-up or nationalization in exchange for divesting itself of Western Union and allowing non-competing independent telephone companies to interconnect with its long-distance network. After 1934, the Federal Communications Commission (FCC) assumed regulation of AT&T.

Proliferation of telephone service allowed the company to become the largest corporation in the world until its dismantling by the United States Department of Justice in 1984, at which time the Bell System ceased to exist.

=== Formation under Bell patent ===
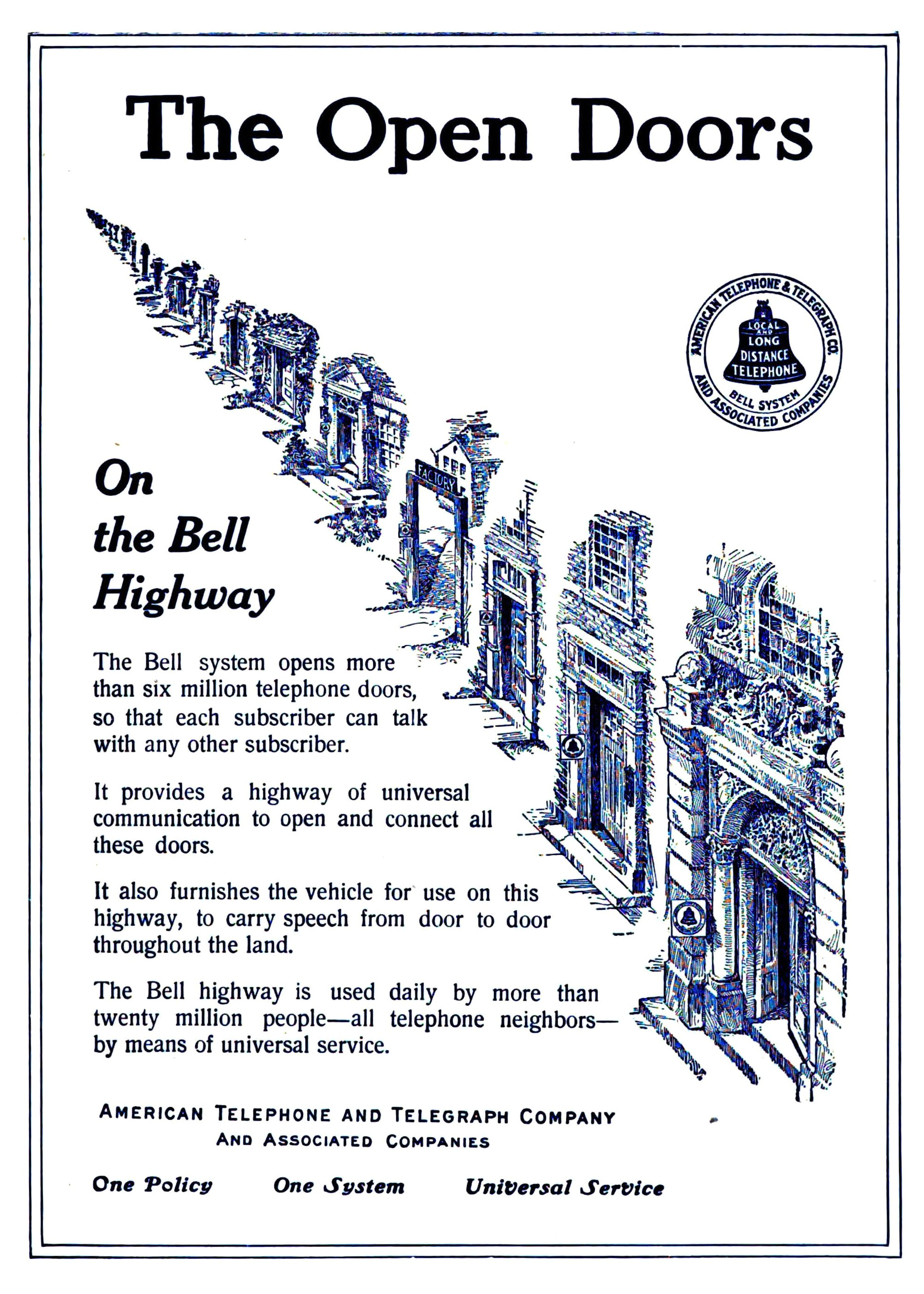
1912 Bell System advertisement promoting its slogan for universal service

Receiving a U.S. patent for the invention of the telephone on March 7, 1876, Alexander Graham Bell formed the Bell Telephone Company in 1877, which in 1885 became AT&T.

When Bell's original patent expired 15 years later in 1894, the telephone market opened to competition and 6,000 new telephone companies started while the Bell Telephone company took a significant financial downturn.

On April 30, 1907, Theodore Newton Vail returned as President of AT&T. Vail believed in the superiority of one national telephone system and AT&T adopted the slogan One Policy, One System, Universal Service. This became the company's philosophy for the next 70 years. Under Vail, AT&T began acquiring many of the smaller telephone companies including the Western Union Telegraph Company.

=== Kingsbury Commitment ===
In response to the threat of antitrust action from government, AT&T entered into an out-of-court agreement, known as the Kingsbury Commitment with the Department of Justice in 1913. AT&T committed to sell its $30 million in Western Union capital stock, allow competitors to interconnect with its long-distance telephone network, and not acquire other independent companies without permission from the Interstate Commerce Commission.

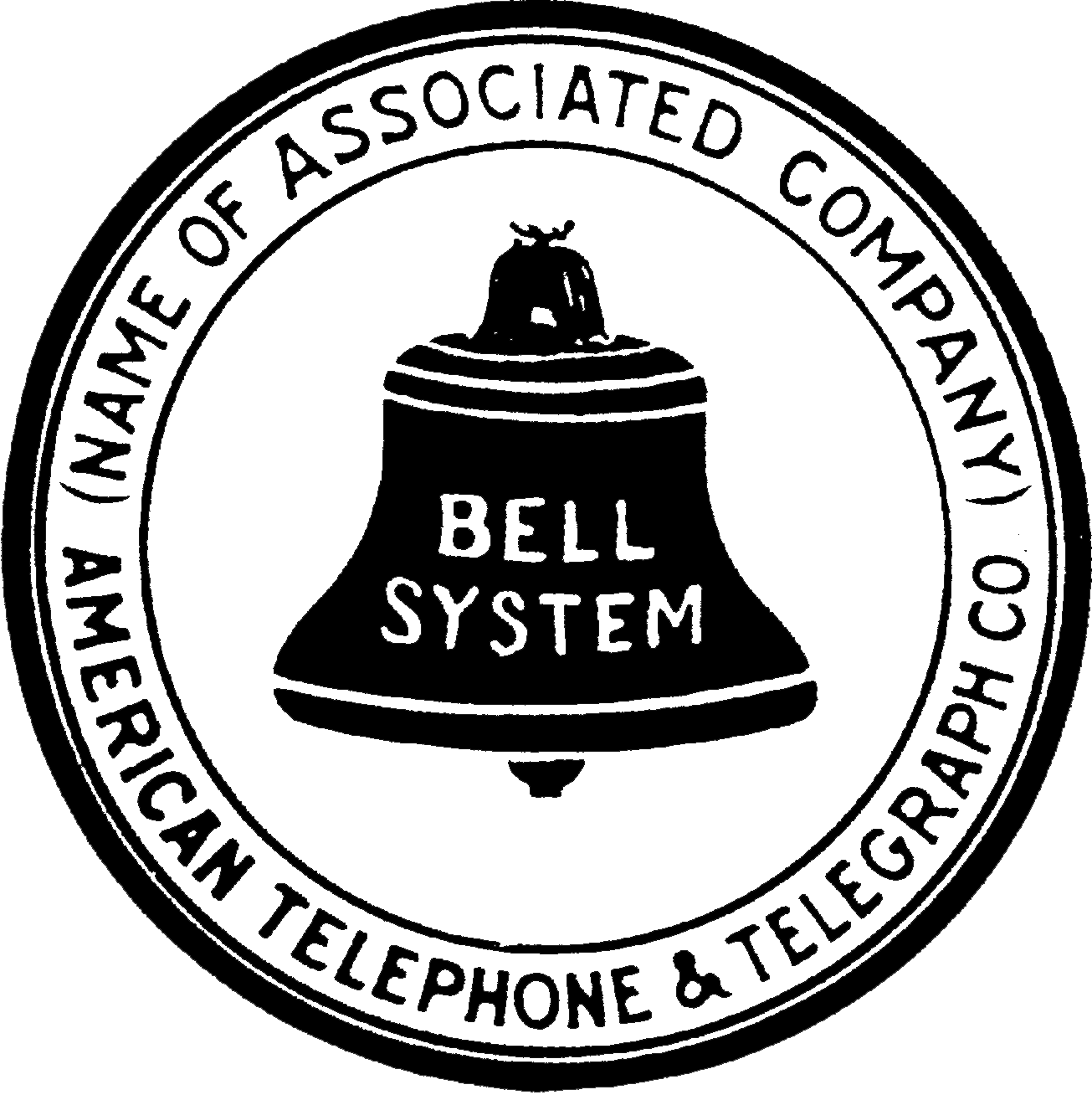
Logo style of Bell System affiliated companies from 1921 to 1939

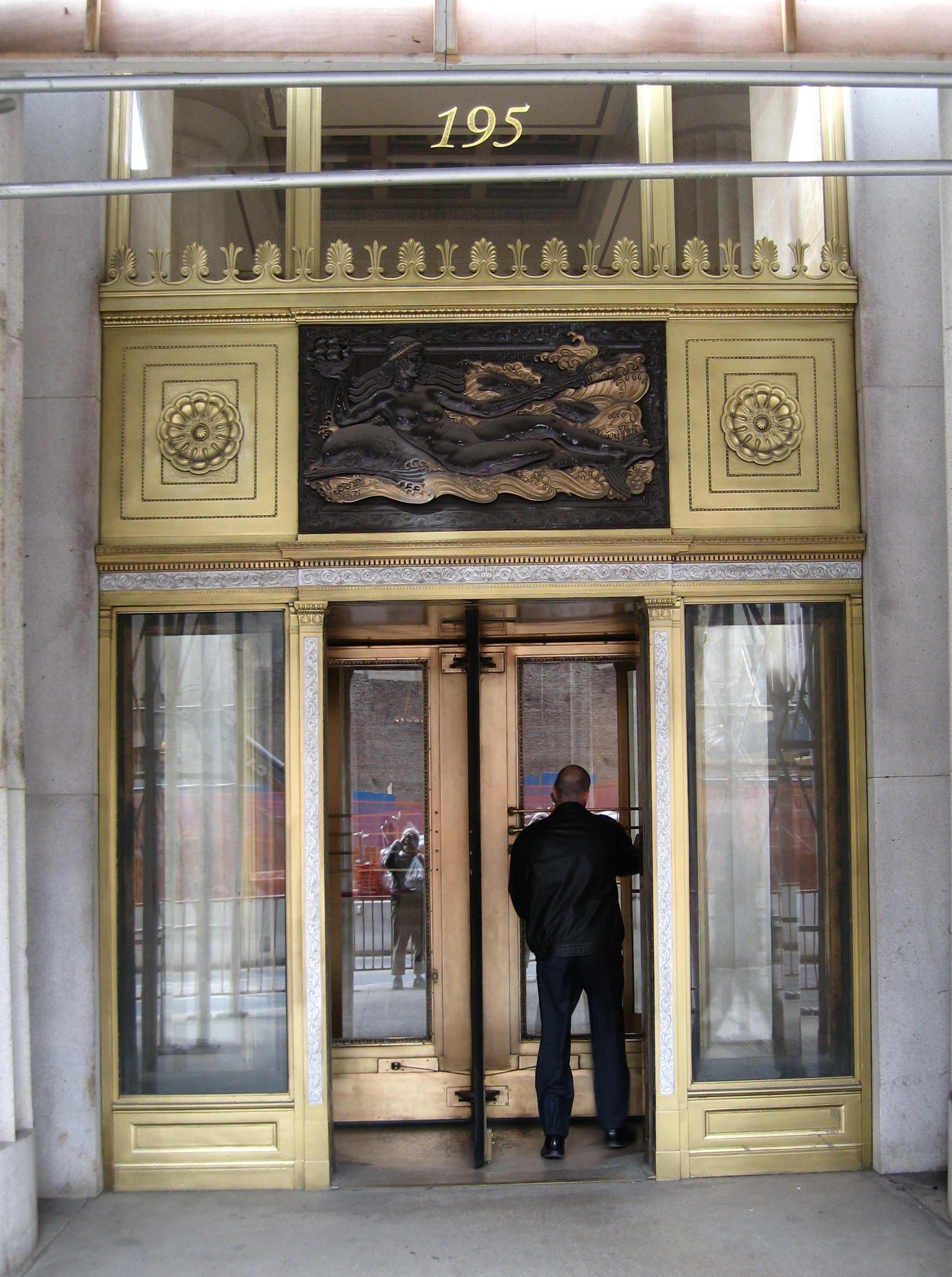
195 Broadway, AT&T headquarters for most of the 20th century

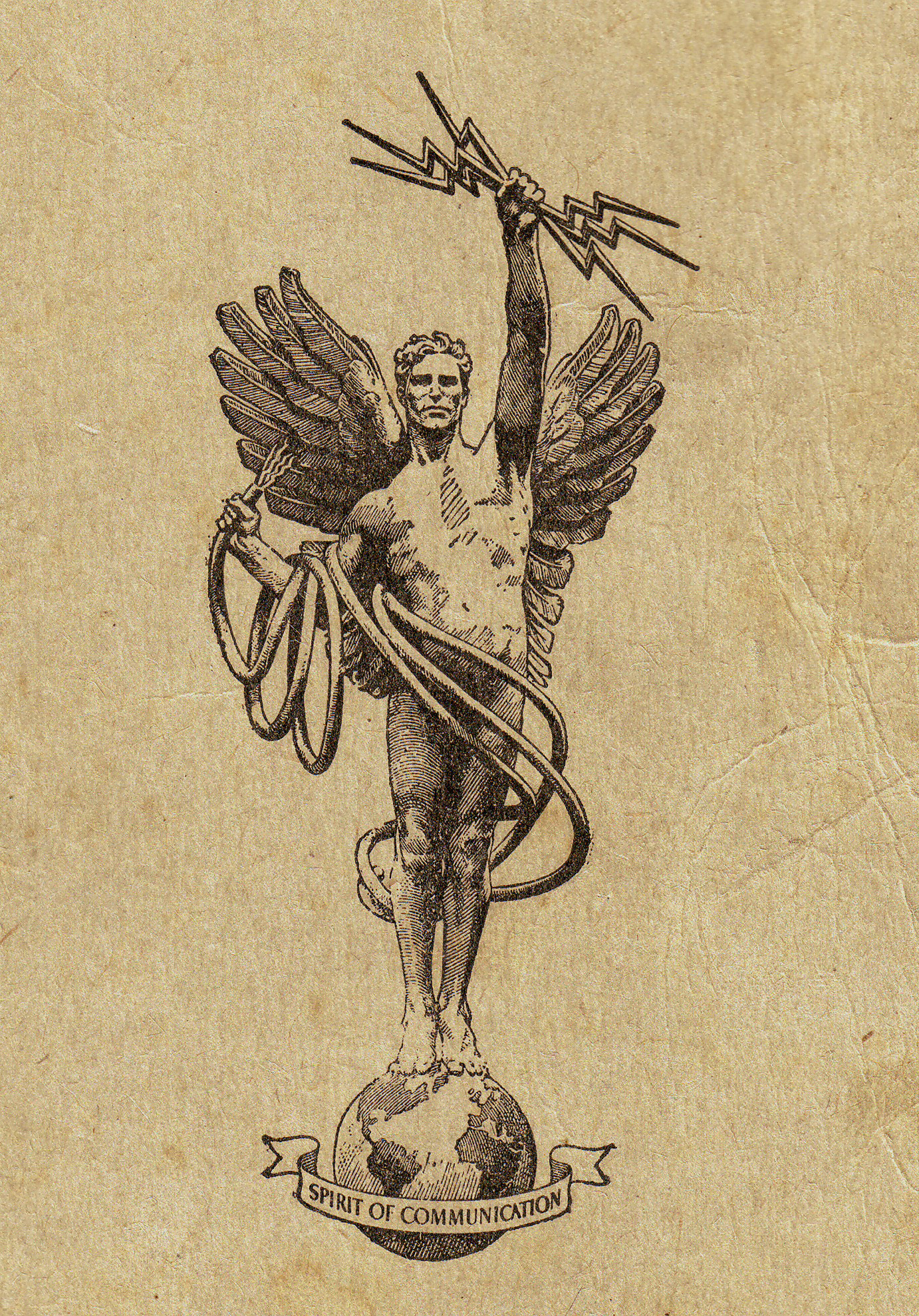
The Spirit of Communication as used on the Bell System's directories in the 1930s and 1940s

=== Nationwide monopoly ===
The Bell trademark was used from 1921 through 1969 by both the AT&T corporation and the regional operating corporations to co-brand themselves under a single Bell System trademark. For each regional operating company, its name was placed where "name of associated company" appears in this template version of the trademark.

Bell system telephones and related equipment were made by Western Electric, a wholly owned subsidiary of AT&T Co. Member telephone companies paid a fixed fraction of their revenues as a license fee to Bell Labs.

As a result of this vertical monopoly, the Bell System effectively owned most telephone service in the United States by 1940, from local and long-distance service to the telephones. This allowed Bell to prohibit its customers from connecting equipment not made or sold by Bell to the system without paying fees. For example, if a customer desired a style of telephone not leased by the local Bell company, the customer was required to purchase the instrument at cost, furnish it to the telephone company for rewiring, pay a service charge, and a monthly lease fee for using it.

==== 1956 Consent Decree ====
In 1949, the United States Department of Justice alleged in an antitrust lawsuit that AT&T and the Bell System operating companies were using their near-monopoly in telecommunications to attempt to establish unfair advantage in related technologies. The outcome was a 1956 consent decree limiting AT&T to 85% of the United States' national telephone network and certain government contracts, and from continuing to hold interests in Canada and the Caribbean. The Bell System's Canadian operations included the Bell Canada regional operating company and the Northern Electric manufacturing subsidiary of the Bell System's Western Electric equipment manufacturer. Western Electric divested Northern Electric in 1956, but AT&T did not divest itself of Bell Canada until 1975. ITT Inc., then known as International Telephone & Telegraph Co., purchased the Bell System's Caribbean regional operating companies.

The consent decree also forced Bell to make all of its patents royalty-free. This led to substantial increases in innovation, in particular in the electronics and computer sectors. Steven Weber's The Success of Open Source characterizes the consent decree as important in fostering the open source movement.

The Bell System also owned various Caribbean regional operating companies, as well as 54% of Japan's NEC and a post-World War II reconstruction relationship with state-owned Nippon Telegraph and Telephone (NTT) before the 1956 boundaries were emplaced. Before 1956, the Bell System's reach was truly gargantuan. Even during the period from 1956 to 1984, the Bell System's dominant reach into all forms of communications was pervasive within the United States and influential in telecommunication standardization throughout the industrialized world.

The 1984 Bell System divestiture brought an end to the affiliation branded as the Bell System. It resulted from another antitrust lawsuit filed by the U.S. Department of Justice in 1974, alleging illegal practices by the Bell System companies to stifle competition in the telecommunications industry. The parties settled the lawsuit on January 8, 1982, superseding the former restrictions that AT&T and the DOJ had agreed upon in 1956.

== Subsidiaries ==
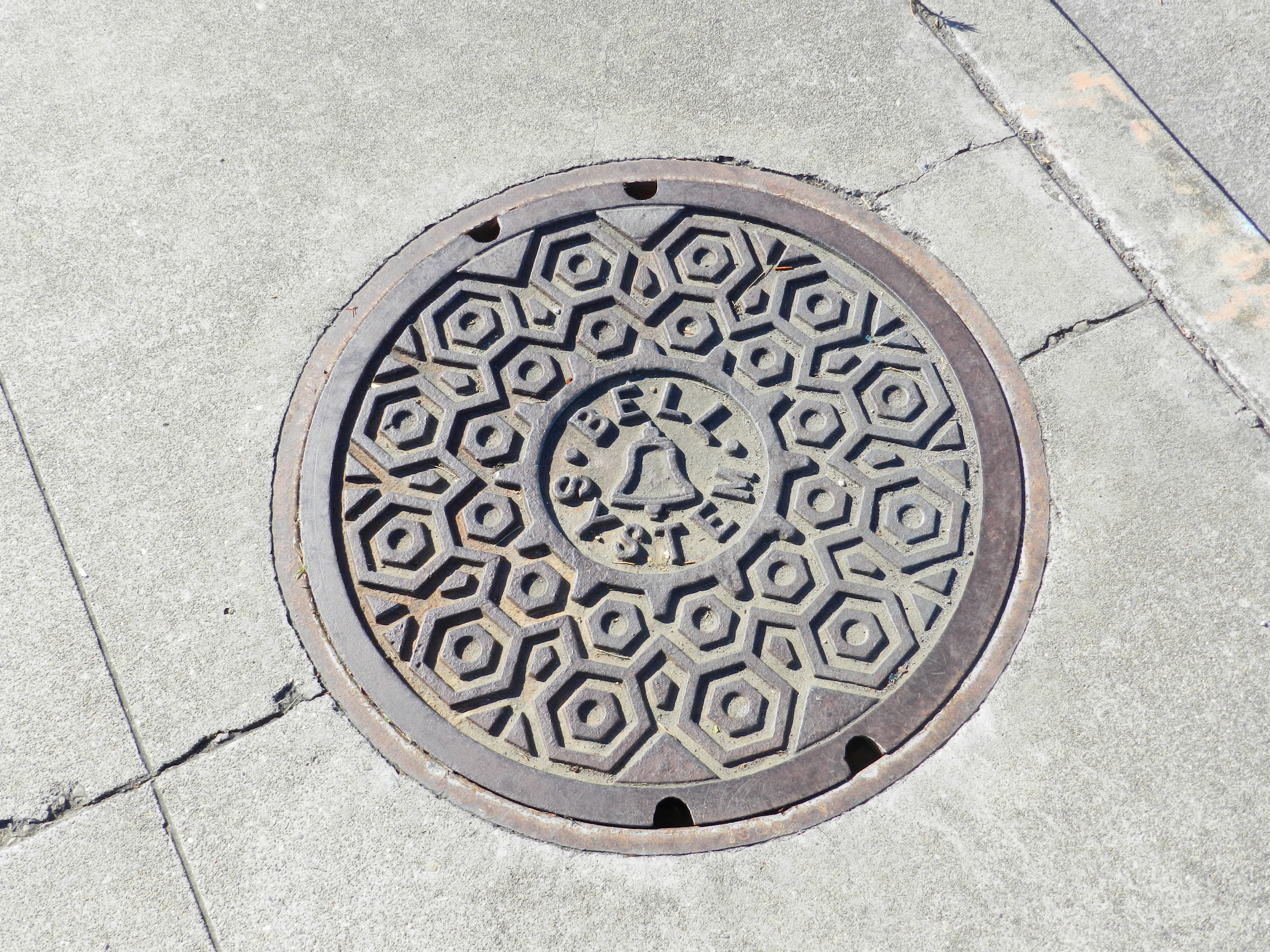
Manhole cover with Bell System logo

=== Pre-1956 international holdings ===
Before the 1956 break-up, the Bell System included the companies listed below, plus those listed in the pre-1984 section. Northern Electric and the Caribbean regional operating companies were considered part of the Bell System proper before the break-up. Nippon Electric was considered a more distant affiliate of Western Electric, and through its own research and development adapted the designs of Western Electric's North American telecommunications equipment for use in Japan, which to this day gives much of Japan's telephone equipment and network a closer resemblance to North American ANSI and iconectiv standards than to European-originated ITU-T standards. Before the 1956 break-up, Northern Electric was focused on manufacturing, without significant telecommunication-equipment research & development of its own. The operation of Japan's NTT during the post-World War II occupation was considered an administrative adjunct to the North American Bell System.

- Nortel Networks Corporation, formerly Northern Telecom, an equipment-manufacturing company
  - Northern Electric, a former telecommunications equipment-manufacturing subsidiary of Western Electric
  - Dominion Electric, a former recording equipment-manufacturing company
- Various former Caribbean regional operating companies, sold to ITT
- NEC, an equipment-manufacturing company in Japan
  - Nippon Electric, a former telecommunications equipment-manufacturing company 54% owned by Western Electric
- NTT, a telecommunications company in Japan that was administered by AT&T as part of General Douglas MacArthur's post-WWII reconstruction

=== Pre-1984 breakup ===
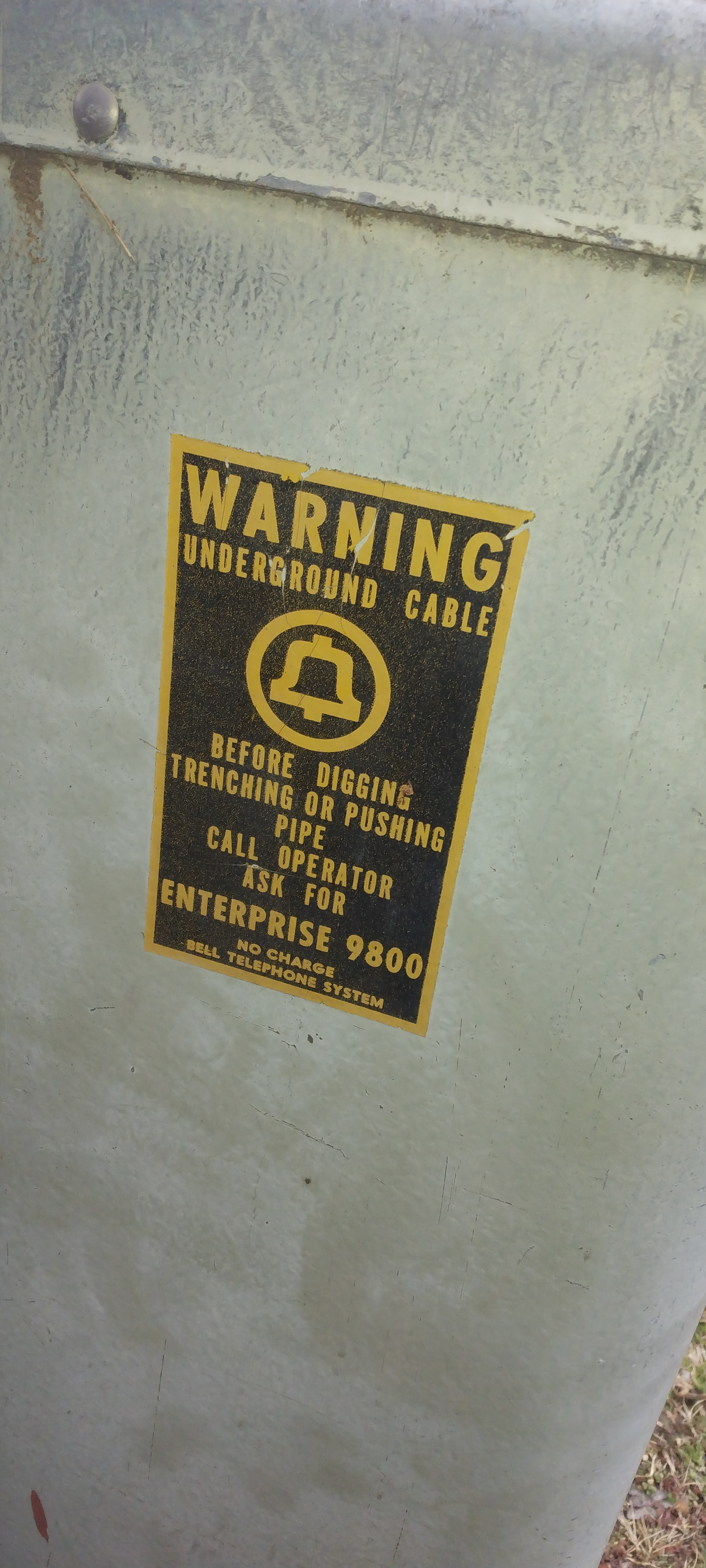
A Bell Telephone System telecommunications pedestal

Immediately before the 1984 break-up, the Bell System had the following corporate structure:

American Telephone and Telegraph Company, the parent holding company and long-distance carrier

Local operating companies:

- Bell of Pennsylvania
- C&P Telephone
- C&P Telephone of Maryland
- C&P Telephone of West Virginia
- C&P Telephone of Virginia
- Diamond State Telephone Company
- Illinois Bell
- Indiana Bell
- Michigan Bell
- Mountain Bell
  - Malheur Bell
- New England Telephone
- New Jersey Bell
- New York Telephone
- Nevada Bell
- Northwestern Bell
- Ohio Bell
- Pacific Telephone
- Pacific Northwest Bell
- South Central Bell
- Southern Bell
- Southwestern Bell
- Wisconsin Bell

Partly owned local operating companies:

- Cincinnati Bell (22.7% owned)
- Southern New England Telephone (16.8% owned)

Other subsidiaries:

- Western Electric Co., Inc. (equipment manufacturing)
- Bell Telephone Laboratories, Inc. (research and development, co-owned between AT&T and Western Electric)
- Bellcomm, Inc. (1963–1972; formed to support the Apollo program)

=== 1984 ===
On January 1, 1984, the former components of the Bell System were structured into the following Regional Bell Operating Companies (RBOCs), which became known as Baby Bells.

- American Information Technologies Corporation, branded as Ameritech
  - Illinois Bell Telephone Company
  - Indiana Bell Telephone Company, Incorporated
  - Michigan Bell Telephone Company
  - The Ohio Bell Telephone Company
  - Wisconsin Bell, Inc.
- American Telephone and Telegraph Company
  - AT&T Communications, Inc.
  - AT&T Information Systems, Inc.
  - AT&T Technologies, Inc.
  - Bell Telephone Laboratories, Inc.
- Bell Atlantic Corporation
  - New Jersey Bell Telephone Company
  - The Bell Telephone Company of Pennsylvania
  - The Chesapeake and Potomac Telephone Company
  - The Chesapeake and Potomac Telephone Company of Maryland
  - The Chesapeake and Potomac Telephone Company of West Virginia
  - The Chesapeake and Potomac Telephone Company of Virginia
  - The Diamond State Telephone Company
- Bell Communications Research, Inc., owned equally by all of the Baby Bells
- BellSouth Corporation
  - Southern Bell Telephone and Telegraph Company
  - South Central Bell Telephone Company
- Cincinnati Bell, Inc.
  - Cincinnati Bell Telephone Company
- NYNEX Corporation
  - New York Telephone Company
  - New England Telephone and Telegraph Company
- Pacific Telesis Group
  - Pacific Bell Telephone Company
    - Nevada Bell Telephone Company
- Southwestern Bell Corporation
  - Southwestern Bell Telephone Company
- The Southern New England Telephone Company
- U S WEST, Inc.
  - Northwestern Bell Telephone Company
  - Pacific Northwest Bell Telephone Company
  - The Mountain States Telephone and Telegraph Company
    - Malheur Home Telephone Company

=== Today ===
After 1984, multiple mergers occurred of the operating companies and between them, so that some components of the former Bell System are now owned by companies independent of the historic Bell System, including foreign telecommunications firms. The structure of the companies today is as follows.

==== Remaining "Regional Bell Operating Companies" ====
- AT&T Inc., a holding company
  - AT&T Corp., a current subsidiary
  - AT&T Teleholdings, Inc. (formerly Ameritech Corporation), a current subsidiary, also includes now defunct Pacific Telesis
    - Illinois Bell Telephone Company, a regional LEC
    - Indiana Bell Telephone Company, Incorporated, a currently existing regional LEC
    - Michigan Bell Telephone Company, a regional LEC
    - Pacific Bell Telephone Company, a regional LEC
      - Nevada Bell Telephone Company, a regional LEC, omitted from the MFJ
    - The Ohio Bell Telephone Company, a regional LEC
    - Wisconsin Bell, Inc., a regional LEC
  - BellSouth LLC, a current subsidiary. Its two operating companies merged into one:
    - BellSouth Telecommunications, LLC, a regional LEC, includes Southern Bell & South Central Bell
  - Southwestern Bell Telephone Company, a regional LEC
- Verizon Communications, Inc., formerly Bell Atlantic Corporation, a holding company
  - NYNEX LLC, a former RBOC holding company
    - Verizon New England, Inc., a regional LEC
    - Verizon New York, Inc., a regional LEC
  - Verizon Delaware LLC, a regional LEC
  - Verizon Maryland, Inc., a regional LEC
  - Verizon New Jersey, Inc., a regional LEC
  - Verizon Pennsylvania, Inc., a regional LEC
  - Verizon Washington, D.C., Inc., a regional LEC
  - Verizon Virginia, Inc., a regional LEC
  - Frontier Communications Corporation, formerly an independent LEC holding company, acquired by Verizon in 2026
    - Frontier Communications ILEC Holdings, Inc., an LEC holding company created by Verizon and sold to Frontier in 2010
    - Frontier West Virginia, Inc., a regional LEC, formerly C&P Telephone of West Virginia
    - The Southern New England Telephone Company, a regional LEC that AT&T owned 16.8% of before 1984 and thus was left separate by the 1984 break-up (subsequently acquired by SBC and then sold to Frontier by the new AT&T after the SBC-AT&T merger)
- Lumen Technologies, Inc. (formerly CenturyLink, Inc.), an independent LEC holding company
  - Qwest Communications International, Inc., a holding company acquired in 2011; originally a non-Bell company, acquired and merged U S WEST in 2000.
    - Qwest Services Corporation, a holding company within the Qwest corporate structure
      - Qwest Corporation, a regional LEC, originally Mountain Bell, includes defunct Malheur Bell, Northwestern Bell, Pacific Northwest Bell
  - In 2026, Lumen Technologies sold its mass-market broadband connectivity business to AT&T Inc., which brought most of US WEST's territory into AT&T's terrestrial service footprint.

Other "Bell Operating Companies"

Cincinnati Bell's alternative logo retained the iconic Bell logo until 2016

The following telephone companies are considered independent of the Baby Bells:

- Cincinnati Bell, Inc., an independent LEC holding company, owned by Macquarie Infrastructure and Real Assets in 2021 and doing business as Altafiber.
  - Cincinnati Bell Telephone Company LLC, a LEC of which AT&T owned 27.8% before 1984 and thus was left separate in the 1984 break-up
- Consolidated Communications Holdings, Inc., an independent LEC holding company
  - FairPoint Communications, Inc., an LEC holding company sold to Consolidated in 2017
    - Consolidated Communications of Northern New England Company LLC, a regional LEC created when Verizon New England lines in Maine and New Hampshire were sold to FairPoint in 2008
    - Consolidated Communications of Vermont Company LLC, a regional LEC created when Verizon New England lines in Vermont were sold to FairPoint in 2008

Other "Bell System" companies

The following companies were divested after 1984 from AT&T Corp. or the Baby Bells and do not provide telephone service.

- Lucent Technologies, a research and equipment manufacturing company spun-off in 1995; merged with French company Alcatel in 2006 to form Alcatel-Lucent which was acquired by Finland's Nokia Corporation in 2016
  - Western Electric Company, Incorporated, a former telecommunications and recording equipment-manufacturing company that ceased to have that name as of the 1984 break-up
    - Alcatel-Lucent Bell, a subsidiary of Alcatel-Lucent that was founded in Antwerp, Belgium in 1882, by Western Electric; came into Alcatel-Lucent ownership via ITT and Alcatel
  - Bell Telephone Laboratories, Inc., the former AT&T-corporate research unit known as Bell Labs: also spun-off to Lucent Technologies, became Nokia Bell Labs in 2016
- Avaya, Inc., an equipment manufacturing company spun-off from Lucent in 2000
- LSI Corporation, a holding company
  - Agere Systems, incorporated in 2000, the former Micro Electronics subsidiary of Lucent; was then spun-off in 2002 and acquired by LSI in 2007
- Systimax Solutions, the Western Electric Structured Cabling unit, once part of AT&T Network Systems, was spun-off from Avaya in 2002 and became part of CommScope
- iconectiv, formerly known as Telcordia and Bell Communications Research (Bellcore)

Beginning in 1991, the Baby Bells began to consolidate operations or rename their Bell Operating Companies according to the parent company name, such as "Bell Atlantic – Delaware, Inc." or "U S WEST Communications, Inc.", to unify their corporate images.

== Post-breakup Bell trademarks use ==
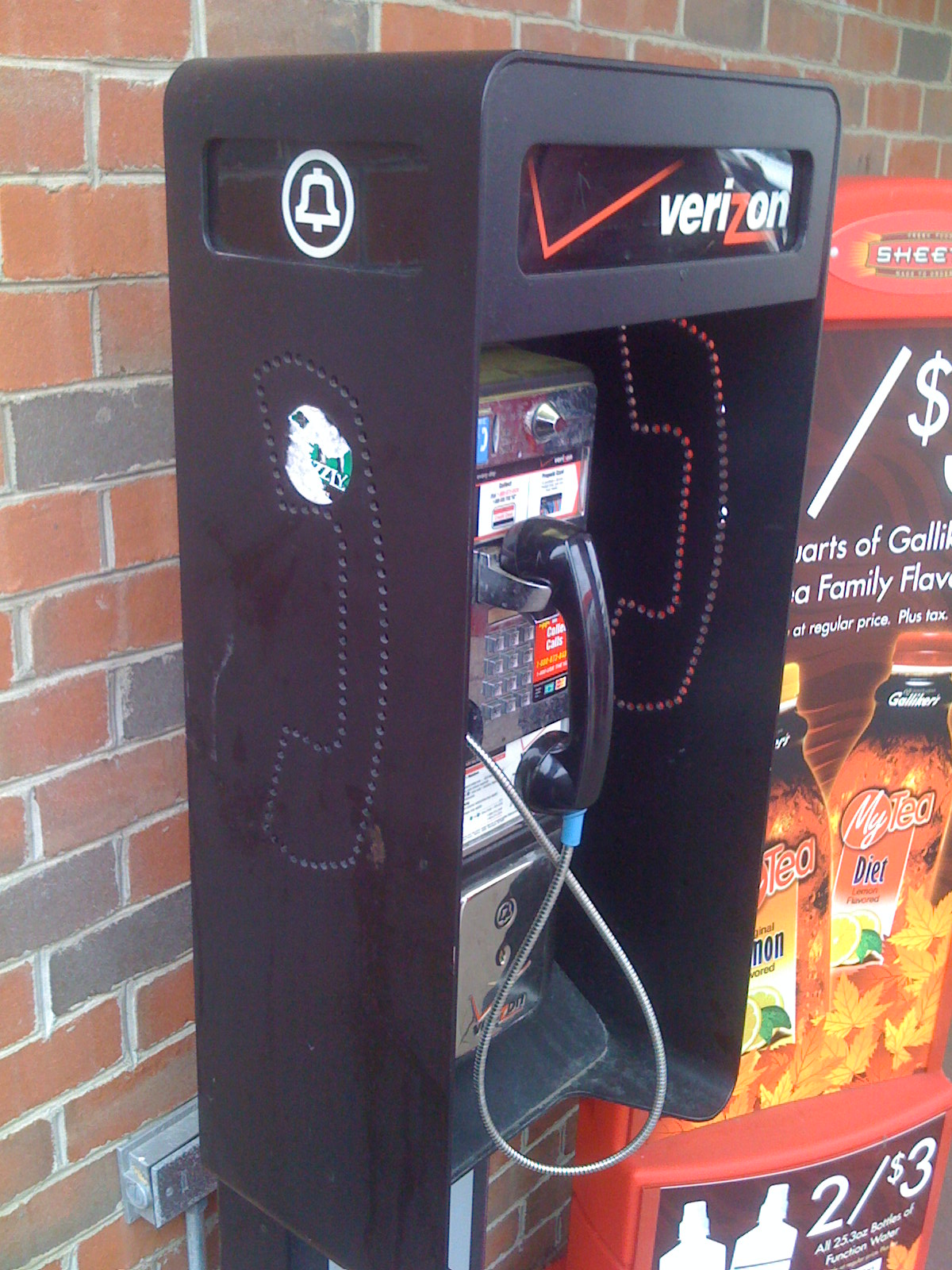
A Verizon payphone with the Bell logo, 2008

The Bell System service marks, including the circled-bell logo, especially as redesigned by Saul Bass in 1969, and the words Bell System in text, were used before January 1, 1984, when the AT&T Corporation's divestiture of its regional operating companies took effect. The word mark Bell, the logo, and other related trademarks, are held by each of the remaining Bell companies, namely AT&T, Verizon, Lumen Technologies, and Altafiber. International rights to the marks, except for Canada, are held by a joint venture of these companies, Bell IP Holdings.

Of the various resulting 1984 spinoffs, only BellSouth actively used and promoted the Bell name and logo during its entire history, from the 1984 break-up to its reunion with the new AT&T in 2006. Similarly, cessation of using either the Bell name or logo occurred for many of the other companies more than a decade after the 1984 break-up as part of an acquisition-related rebranding. The others have only used the marks on rare occasions to maintain their trademark rights, even less now that they have adopted names conceived long after divestiture. Examples include Verizon, which still used the Bell logo on its trucks and payphones until it updated its own logo in 2015, and Qwest, formerly US West, which licenses the Northwestern Bell and Mountain Bell names to Unical Enterprises, which makes telephones under the Northwestern Bell name.

In 1984, each Regional Bell Operating Company was assigned a set list of names it was allowed to use in combination with the Bell marks. By 2022, all these Bell System names had disappeared from the United States business landscape. Cincinnati Bell was the last to use the name, until 2022 when it rebranded to Altafiber, though it still has Cincinnati Bell as its corporate name. Southwestern Bell used both the Bell name and the circled-bell trademark until SBC opted for all of its companies to do business under the "SBC" name in 2002. Bell Atlantic used the Bell name and circled-bell trademark until renaming itself Verizon in 2000. Pacific Bell continued operating in California under that name (or the shortened "PacBell" nickname) until SBC purchased it.

In Canada, Bell Canada (divested from AT&T in 1975) continues to use the Bell name. For the decades that Nortel was named Northern Telecom, its research and development arm was Bell Northern Research. Bell Canada and its holding-company parent, Bell Canada Enterprises, still use the Bell name. They used variations of the circled-bell logo until 1977, which until 1976 strongly resembled the 1921 to 1939 Bell System trademark.

== Landline network retirement ==
Thanks to the availability of new connectivity solutions made possible by technological advancements in fixed and mobile communications, in 2026 AT&T plans to begin retiring the nationwide copper-based landline telephone network that was substantially installed by the Bell System. In October of that year, the company reported that only 1% of the customers reachable by its legacy copper-based voice telephone network were still connected to it.

== See also ==
- Bell Memorial
- Bell System Practices
- Independent telephone company
- The Telephone Cases
