= Kingsbury Commitment =

United States telecommunication anti-trust proceeding

The Kingsbury Commitment is a 1913 out-of-court settlement of the United States government's antitrust challenge against the American Telephone and Telegraph Company (AT&T) for the company's then-growing vertical monopoly in the telecommunications industry. In return for the government's agreement not to pursue legal action against the company as a monopolist, AT&T agreed to divest the controlling interest it had acquired in the Western Union Telegraph Company, and to allow non-competing independent telephone companies to interconnect with the AT&T long-distance network.

== History ==
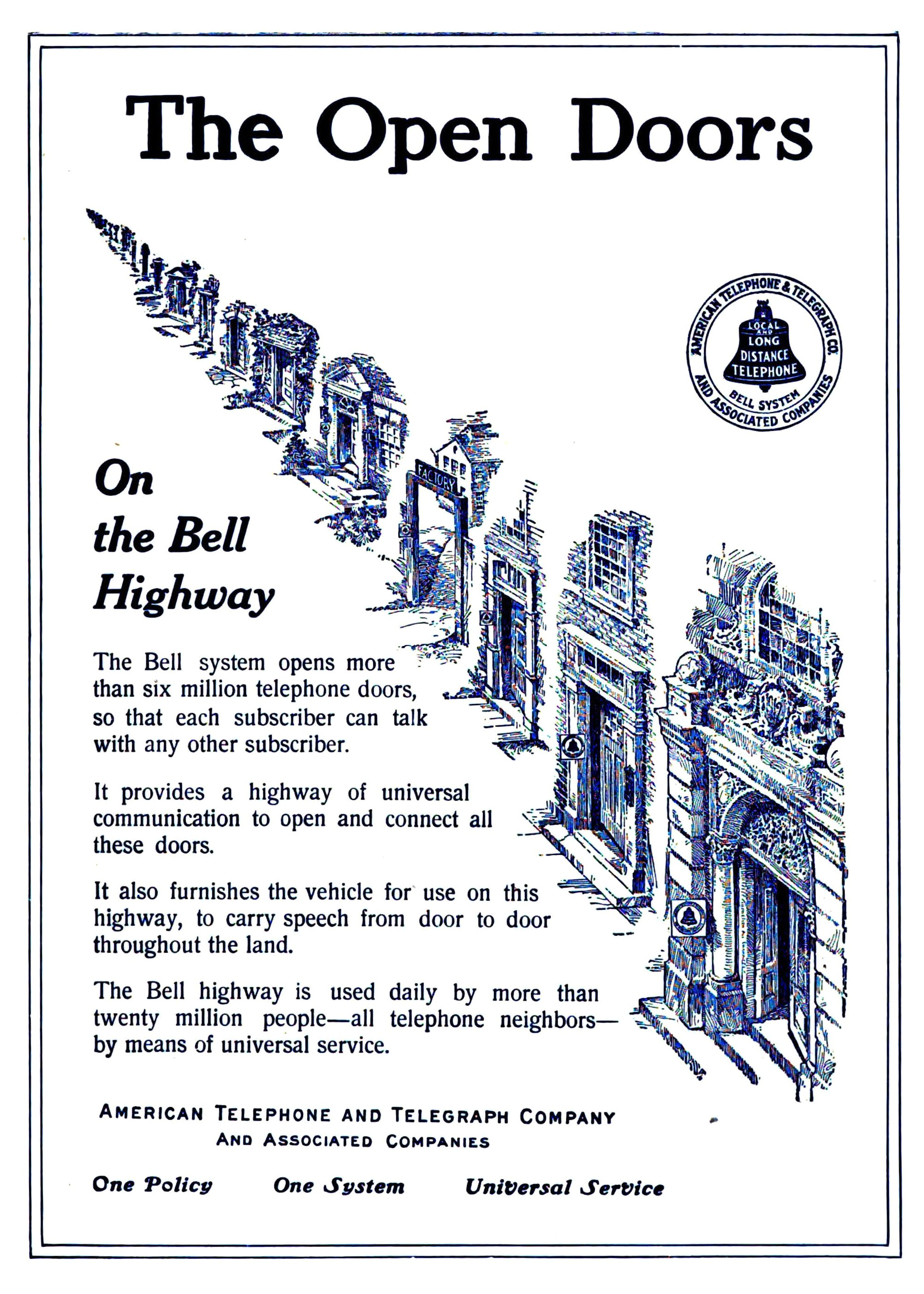
1912 Bell System advertisement promoting universal service

In 1907, Theodore N. Vail became president of AT&T for the second time. Immediately, he steered the company into a new direction, in terms of vision, company organization, and technology. He envisioned telephone service as a public utility, and the future of the American telephone industry as a unified system of companies under the lead of his company. This required technical standards understood and accepted by all players in the industry. He opened the market for the Western Electric Company, its manufacturing unit which the company had previously restricted to sell products only to the Bell System companies, so that independent operators could buy compatible apparatus. He organized a distinct research division within Western Electric to focus on basic research and development. AT&T had bought Bell-associated companies and organized them into new hierarchies. AT&T had also acquired many of the independents, and bought control of Western Union, giving it a monopolistic position in both telephone and telegraph communication. These efforts and Vail's vision were communicated to the public by marketing campaigns under the slogan One System — One Policy — Universal Service.

AT&T increasingly became a vertically integrated conglomerate. The government had been increasingly worried that AT&T and the other Bell companies were monopolizing the industry. A key strategy by the Bell System was to refuse to connect its long-distance network—technologically, by far the finest and most extensive in the nation—with independent carriers. Without the prospect of long-distance services, the market position of many independent operators became untenable. AT&T's strategies prompted complaints and attracted the attention of the Justice Department.

== Agreement ==
Faced with a government investigation and a possible suit for antitrust violations, AT&T entered into negotiations that carried on for several months in 1913. The conclusion came in form of a voluntary commitment in form of a letter by AT&T's Vice President Nathan Kingsbury, who secured approval by executives and the government representatives before submittal. In the letter, dated December 19, 1913, AT&T agreed with Attorney General James Clark McReynolds to divest itself of Western Union, to provide long-distance services to independent exchanges under certain conditions, and to refrain from acquisitions if the Interstate Commerce Commission objected. Justice Department officials opined that the plan gave the government everything and more than they could have hoped to obtain in court, and it found the approval of President Woodrow Wilson, who expressed his admiration for the attitude and vision of the telephone company:

My Dear Mr. Attorney General,

Thank you, for letting me see the letter from the American Telephone and Telegraph Company. It is gratifying that the company should thus volunteer to adjust its business to the conditions of competition. I gain the impression more and more, from week to week, that the business men of the country are sincerely desirous of conforming with the law, and it is gratifying, indeed, to have occasion, as in this instance, to deal with them in complete frankness and to be able to show them that all that we desire is an opportunity to co-operate with them. So long as we are dealt with in this spirit, we can help to build up the business of the country upon sound and permanent lines.

Cordially and sincerely yours,

Woodrow Wilson

The Commitment did not settle all differences between independents and Bell companies, but it did avert the federal takeover many had expected. AT&T was allowed to buy market-share, as long as it sold an equal number of subscribers to independents. Crucially, while the Kingsbury Commitment obliged it to connect its long-distance service to independent local carriers, AT&T did not agree to interconnect its local services with other local providers. Nor did AT&T agree to any interconnection with independent long-distance carriers. AT&T's connection with the Western Electric Company was not addressed and the independent manufacturers still could not sell into Bell's market place, but operators had to buy Bell equipment for standard trunks to be able to connect to the Long Lines network.

== Continued monopoly ==
Consequently, AT&T was able to consolidate its control over both the most profitable urban markets and long-distance traffic.

All telephone networks in the United States were nationalized during World War I from June 1918 to July 1919. Following re-privatization, AT&T resumed its near-monopoly position. The Willis Graham Act of 1921 allowed AT&T to acquire more local telephone systems with the genial oversight of the Interstate Commerce Commission (ICC), effectively declaring the telephone business as a natural monopoly. By 1924, the ICC approved AT&T's acquisition of 223 of the 234 independent telephone companies. Between 1921 and 1934, the ICC approved 271 of the 274 purchase requests of AT&T. With the creation of the Federal Communications Commission by the Communications Act of 1934, the government regulated the rates charged by AT&T.

In 1956, AT&T and the Justice Department agreed on a consent decree to end an antitrust suit brought against AT&T in 1949. Under the decree, AT&T restricted its activities to those related to running the national telephone system and agreed to license patents it had developed without royalties.

In 1968, FCC regulators intervened when the Bell System tried to prevent a mobile communications system, the Carterfone, from connecting to telephone lines. That decision established the principle that customers could connect any lawful device to the telephone network, even to offer a competing service. In the mid 1970s, emerging long-distance competitors like MCI and Sprint faced the same tactic of denying interconnection, which regulators quashed, followed by a series of efforts by the Bell System phone companies to escalate the costs of interconnection as an indirect means of excluding competition. These battles resulted a large amount of antitrust litigation and ultimately led to the 1982 breakup of the Bell System.

In 1982, AT&T and the Justice Department agreed on tentative terms for settlement of the antitrust suit filed against AT&T in 1974, under which AT&T divested itself of its local telephone operations, which became known as the "Baby Bells." In return, the Justice Department agreed to lift the restrictions on AT&T activities contained in the 1956 consent decree.

== See also ==
- Bell System divestiture
- Sherman Antitrust Act
- Telecommunications Act of 1996
- United States Independent Telephone Association
