= Verizon Pennsylvania =

Former Baby Bell telecom company

Verizon Pennsylvania LLC
- Current logo of Verizon Pennsylvania LLC Bell of Pennsylvania logo from 1969 to 1984.
- Formerly: Bell Telephone Company of Pennsylvania 1907–1994; Bell Atlantic—Pennsylvania, Inc. 1994–2000; Verizon Pennsylvania, Inc. 2000–2012
- Type: Subsidiary
- Industry: Telecommunications
- Founded: 1879; 147 years ago
- Headquarters: Philadelphia, Pennsylvania, U.S.
- Area served: Pennsylvania
- Key people: William B. Petersen (president)
- Products: POTS, DSL, FiOS (FTTP)
- Parent: American Bell (1879–1899); AT&T (1899–1983); Bell Atlantic (1984–2000); Verizon (2000–present)
- Subsidiaries: Verizon North
- Website: www.verizon.com

Verizon Pennsylvania LLC, formerly traded as Bell of Pennsylvania, is the Bell Operating Company serving most of Pennsylvania. The company was founded in 1879 as Bell Telephone Company of Philadelphia, owned by National Bell Telephone Company, which later became American Bell.

In 1899, the company became a subsidiary of American Telephone and Telegraph Company following its buyout of American Bell.

The company is separate from Verizon North, which consists of former GTE-owned assets in rural Pennsylvania.

== History ==
The company was founded in 1879 to serve Philadelphia. In 1907, the company changed its name to The Bell Telephone Company of Pennsylvania, a name under which it began to expand.

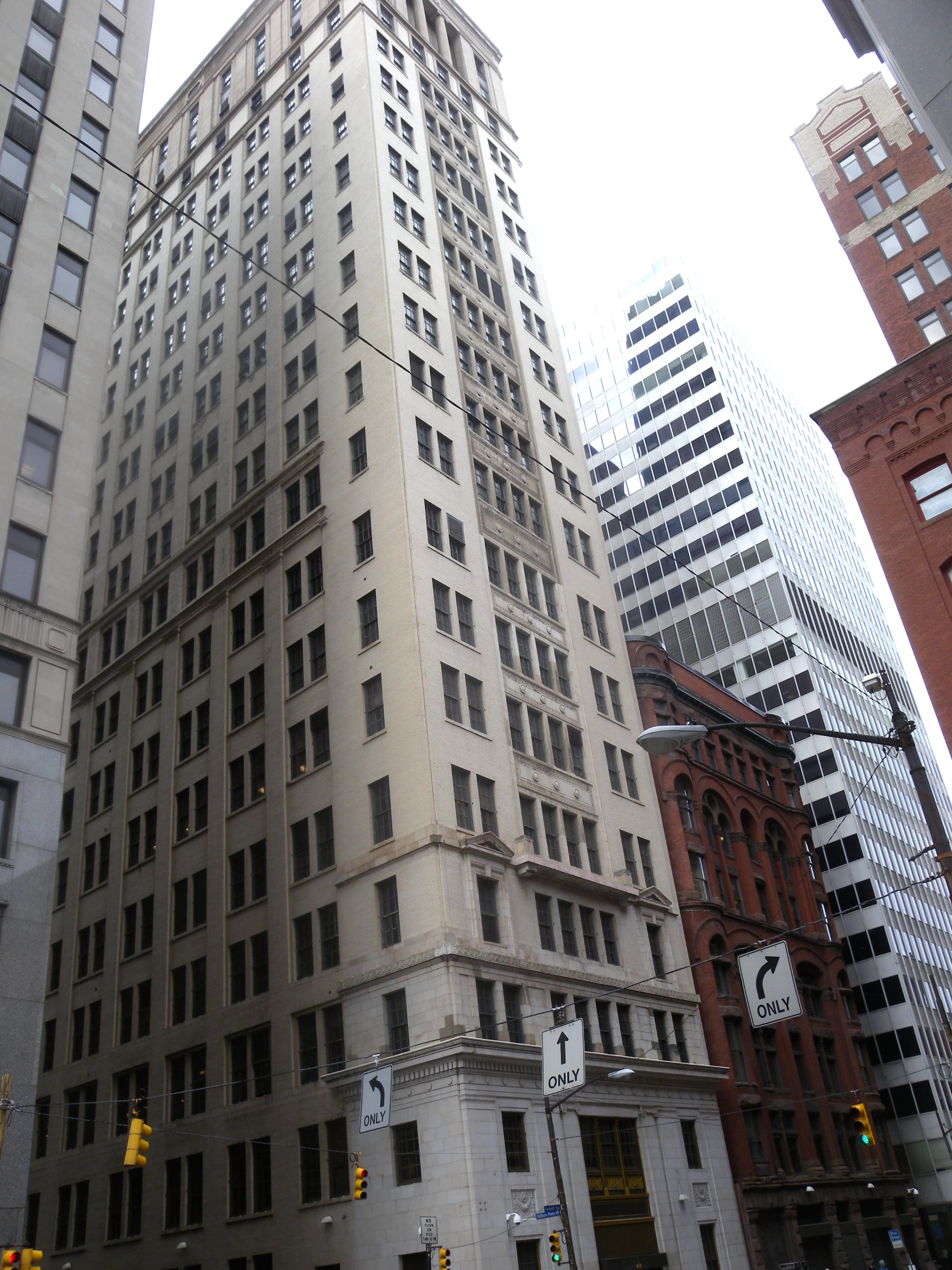
Bell Telephone Building, Pittsburgh

In 1918, the company embarked on a series of acquisitions enlarging its coverage area from Philadelphia to statewide. In 1918, it acquired Central District Telephone. In 1924, it acquired Pittsburgh and Allegheny Telephone.

In 1925, Bell of Pennsylvania made a $1.84 million acquisition of telephone exchanges in Wayne, Lackawanna, Luzerne, Berks, Bucks, Montgomery, and Schuylkill counties from Lehigh Telephone. It also acquired Tri-State Telephone and Pennsylvania State Telephone that year. In 1926, it acquired Stroudsburg and Bushkill Telephone and Meadville Telephone. In 1927, it acquired Home Telephone Company, Blairsville Telephone Company, Summerville Telephone Company, Brookville Telephone Company, and Huntington & Clearfield Telephone Company.

In April 1930, The company acquired Lehigh Telephone. During 1930, it also exchanged assets with Cumberland Valley Telephone Company in Dauphin, Mifflin, and Cumberland Counties. In 1932 Bell acquired properties of Clinton Telephone, which operated in portions of Lycoming and Clinton Counties. In 1944, it acquired Keystone Telephone Company of Philadelphia for $13.4 million.

== Post-Divestiture ==
In 1984, the Bell System Divestiture split Bell of Pennsylvania off into a Regional Bell Operating Company, along with the 21 other BOCs AT&T had a majority stake in. On January 1, 1984, Bell of Pennsylvania became part of Bell Atlantic.

Throughout the 1980s to the first half of the 1990s, Bell of Pennsylvania, also called Pennsylvania Bell, kept its traditional identity. In 1994, Bell Atlantic started rebranding all its companies to Bell Atlantic-(state), so Bell of Pennsylvania became Bell Atlantic - Pennsylvania, Inc. In 2000, after the Bell Atlantic-GTE merger, the corporation changed its name to Verizon, and so Bell of Pennsylvania once again changed its name, this time to Verizon Pennsylvania, Inc.

In 2012, Verizon created a Delaware limited liability company named Verizon Pennsylvania LLC. Verizon Pennsylvania, Inc., a Pennsylvania corporation, was then legally merged into the Delaware-based LLC.

The company's headquarters in Philadelphia are shared with Verizon Delaware, an arrangement that has existed since the Bell System existed.

== See also ==
- Verizon
- Bell System
- Bell System Divestiture
- AT&T Corporation
