= Ohio Bell =

Former telephone company in Ohio, US

The Ohio Bell Telephone Company
- Trade name: AT&T Ohio
- Company type: Subsidiary
- Industry: Telecommunications
- Founded: September 1922; 103 years ago
- Headquarters: 750 Huron Road, Cleveland, Ohio, United States
- Products: Local Telephone Service
- Parent: AT&T Corp. (1922-1983); Ameritech (1984-1999); SBC/AT&T Inc. (1999-present)
- Website: www.att.com

The Ohio Bell Telephone Company, now doing business as AT&T Ohio, is the Bell Operating Company serving most of Ohio and parts of West Virginia. It is a wholly owned subsidiary of AT&T.

Its headquarters is the Ohio Bell Building at 750 Huron Road, Cleveland, Ohio, and formerly had a secondary headquarters at 150 East Gay Street, Columbus, Ohio, now the Continental Center. Ohio Bell is not affiliated with Cincinnati Bell, which serves Cincinnati, Ohio and other surrounding communities.

After the 1984 Bell System Divestiture, Ohio Bell became a subsidiary of Ameritech, one of the seven original Regional Bell Operating Companies. The Ohio Bell name continued to be used until January 1993, when Ameritech dropped all of its individual Bell Operating Company names in favor of its corporate name for marketing purposes; Ohio Bell then began doing business as Ameritech Ohio.

After Ameritech was acquired by SBC in 1999, Ohio Bell continued to retain the "Ameritech" brand until 2001, when it began doing business as SBC Ameritech Ohio. A year later, in 2002, SBC dropped the Ameritech name in favor of "SBC" as a national brand, resulting in the trade name of SBC Ohio. On January 15, 2006, after SBC's acquisition of AT&T, Ohio Bell's trade name was changed, again, to AT&T Ohio, a name which it continues to use today.
