= Chuck Smith (businessman) =

American businessman

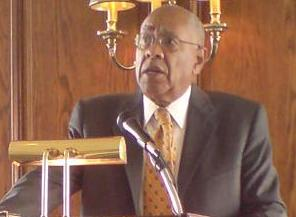

Charles H. Smith was an African-American businessman who is the retired President and CEO of the Fortune 500 company, AT&T West. Smith had a lifelong interest in the Boy Scouts of America (BSA).

His childhood interest in radio led to a career in telecommunications. Smith graduated from California State University, Los Angeles in 1967. He was hired by Pacific Telephone, which became AT&T West. Smith was named one of the 50 Most Important African Americans in Technology by US Black Engineer and Information Technology magazine in 2003.

Smith is committed to mentoring young African-Americans. As a youth, he had dyslexia and was very shy. He found a support system in Scouting. Smith became an Eagle Scout in 1959, and was a 2005 recipient of the Distinguished Eagle Scout Award. He gives speeches that are well-received about the positive impact Scouting had on him as a youth. He is also a member of BSA's National Executive Board and the board of BSA's Mount Diablo Silverado Council. He supports efforts to increase minority involvement in Scouting. In 2010 he was honored with the Silver Buffalo Award by the Boy Scouts of America, its highest award for adults.

Member of Kappa Alpha Psi fraternity, Upsilon chapter at California State University, Los Angeles in spring of 1963.
