= United States v. AT&T (1982) =

1982 case in U.S. antitrust law

U.S. v. AT&T (1982)
- Court: United States District Court for the District of Columbia
- Full case name: United States of America v. American Telephone & Telegraph Co., et al.
- Decided: August 24, 1982
- Citation: 552 F.Supp. 131

Holding
- The Sherman Antitrust Act enabled the United States government to break up the AT&T telephone monopoly into seven smaller companies.

Court membership
- Judge sitting: Harold H. Greene

Laws applied
- Sherman Antitrust Act

United States v. AT&T, 552 F.Supp. 131 (1982), was a ruling of the United States District Court for the District of Columbia, that led to the 1984 Bell System divestiture, and the breakup of the old AT&T natural monopoly into seven regional Bell operating companies and a much smaller new version of AT&T.

== Background ==
Since the Kingsbury Commitment in 1913, AT&T was permitted by the United States government, first via the Interstate Commerce Commission and then via the Federal Communications Commission (FCC), to become the natural monopoly telephone service provider in the country (known as the Bell System) in return for commitments to universal service and basic connectivity for all consumers. As early as 1949, the American government had sued the company for conspiring to restrict the manufacture of handsets and other landline telephone equipment via its control of patents, and discussions about breaking up the AT&T monopoly due to abuses of its market power began during this period.

By the 1950s the FCC began to allow devices manufactured by other firms to be connected to the AT&T landline telephone network, starting with the Hush-A-Phone in 1957. In 1968, the FCC permitted consumer use of the Carterfone, a device that connected the landline network to CB radio networks, thus allowing consumers to receive basic service from AT&T but with wider choices of device manufacturers and auxiliary network service options. The FCC also found evidence during this period that AT&T was overcharging consumers for physical products that had been manufactured by its equipment subsidiary Western Electric, which was itself a monopoly, and using the resulting monopoly profits to subsidize its landline network operations, which was a violation of antitrust law.

These developments, along with an appreciation of new technologies and business models for telephone service that were becoming available, convinced American regulators that AT&T should no longer be tolerated as the natural monopoly in that marketplace. A plan to break up the company into smaller components was proposed by the United States Department of Justice starting in 1974, citing authority under the Sherman Antitrust Act to reduce the power of a monopoly firm. AT&T itself recommended a divestiture structure in which it would be broken up into regional subsidiaries. The Department of Justice action was filed as United States v. AT&T with United States District Court for the District of Columbia in 1974.

== District court proceedings ==
The United States District Court for the District of Columbia oversaw the proceedings for nearly a decade as AT&T and the Department of Justice formulated a plan to break up the company. In 1978, Judge Harold H. Greene, on his first day on the bench at the District Court, took over management of the case.

The Department of Justice announced in early 1982 that it had completed the development of its plan to break up AT&T. Judge Greene investigated this plan and issued a ruling to wrap up the U.S. v. AT&T proceedings. Greene cited evidence that the company had restricted connection of service offerings and devices from other companies to its landline network, had unfairly prioritized equipment manufactured by its Western Electric subsidiary, and had overcharged for long distance telephone calls. Greene then ruled that the plan to break up the company was consistent with various provisions of antitrust law, including the Sherman Act which allows government action against companies that abuse their market power, and the Tunney Act which enables government investigations of the effects of mergers and acquisitions.

The final plan for breaking up AT&T, which was originally in the form of a consent decree between the company and the Department of Justice, was called the Modification of Final Judgment and was signed off by AT&T Chief Executive Officer Charles L. Brown and Assistant Attorney General William F. Baxter. Judge Greene accepted the terms of this agreement in an addendum to his ruling in August 1982.

== Impact and subsequent events ==
After Greene's ruling in August 1982, the AT&T corporate structure was divested into seven regional holding companies that became known as Regional Bell Operating Companies, or colloquially as "Baby Bells", which went into operation on January 1, 1984. Those companies inherited local landline telephone services for each region, while AT&T continued to exist as a long distance service provider at about 30% of its previous size. That version of AT&T was later acquired by one of the Baby Bells. Southwestern Bell; the new entity retained the AT&T name and the company evolved into the present multinational telecommunications firm known as AT&T.

The most obvious impact for consumers was the proliferation of new types of telephone equipment produced by myriad companies, including answering machines and designer handsets, while companies like Sprint and MCI offered competitive new options for long distance service. The Baby Bells were mostly successful and some of them merged with each other, resulting in the modern telecommunications companies Verizon and Lumen Technologies.

The divestiture of AT&T, and the actions by courts and regulatory agencies to achieve it, was the largest government action to reduce a corporation's market power in American history, and it is a dominant instance of the enforcement of American antitrust law. However, the results for the American telecommunications marketplace have been mixed. Some researchers praised the divestiture as an act of deregulation (of a natural monopoly) that enabled more competition, which in turn enabled the development of firms that could serve multiple sectors of the marketplace such as phones, computer networks, and cable television. On the other hand, further technological and financial developments in the telecommunications industry, such as the convergence of networks and services, have made the lessons of the divestiture unclear, as the marketplace is again dominated by an oligopoly of large firms.

The judicial process that enabled the AT&T divestiture is often cited as an instructive historical example in modern discussions about possibly breaking up the big tech firms that have gained market dominance in the 21st century.
