= Bell IP Holdings =

Intellectual property holding company for former Bell System brands

Bell IP Holdings is a joint venture of AT&T, Verizon Communications, Lumen Technologies, and Altafiber (or their respective subsidiaries) which owns the rights to the former Bell System logos and trademarks outside of the U.S. and Canada. It also administers a variety of related common assets such as the domain name bell.com.

In the United States, the aforementioned operating companies each own concurrent rights to the Bell trademarks. Bell Canada retained sole rights to the marks in that country after its spinoff from AT&T in 1975.

Bell IP Holdings was created as result of the sale of Bell Communications Research, Incorporated (Bellcore) to Science Applications International Corporation (SAIC) in 1996.

As a part of the court-ordered restructure of AT&T in 1984, the Bell Logo and Trademarks had been granted to Bellcore, to own and manage on behalf of the seven Regional Bell Operating Systems (RBOCs) and two of the smaller former Bell telecoms, centered in Cincinnati, Ohio and Hartford Connecticut.

The RBOCs determined that the sale of Bellcore to SAIC should be limited to the software and tangible property owned by the consortium, but that the ownership and related value of the Bell name and logo needed to remain with the sellers. Bell IP Holdings was created for the purpose of sustaining that ownership, and thereby preserving the Intellectual Property (IP) value for the Owner Companies (OCs) over time, despite the inevitability of subsequent sales, reallocations and reassignments of specific rights.
