= Pacific Bell Wireless =

Pacific Bell Wireless logo

Pacific Bell Wireless, LLC is a wireless operating division of AT&T Mobility. Pacific Bell Wireless is legally known as Pacific Bell Wireless, LLC d/b/a Cingular Wireless.

It was founded in the mid-1990s, initially named Pacific Bell Mobile Services, as a means for Pacific Telesis to capitalize on the wireless market it had lost when it spun off AirTouch.

Pacific Bell Wireless should not be confused with PacTel Mobile Access, which was spun off as AirTouch in 1994, and was later acquired by Vodafone. It was placed in its joint venture with Verizon, Verizon Wireless.
