= Pacific Telesis =

Defunct American Bell Operating Company

Pacific Telesis Group

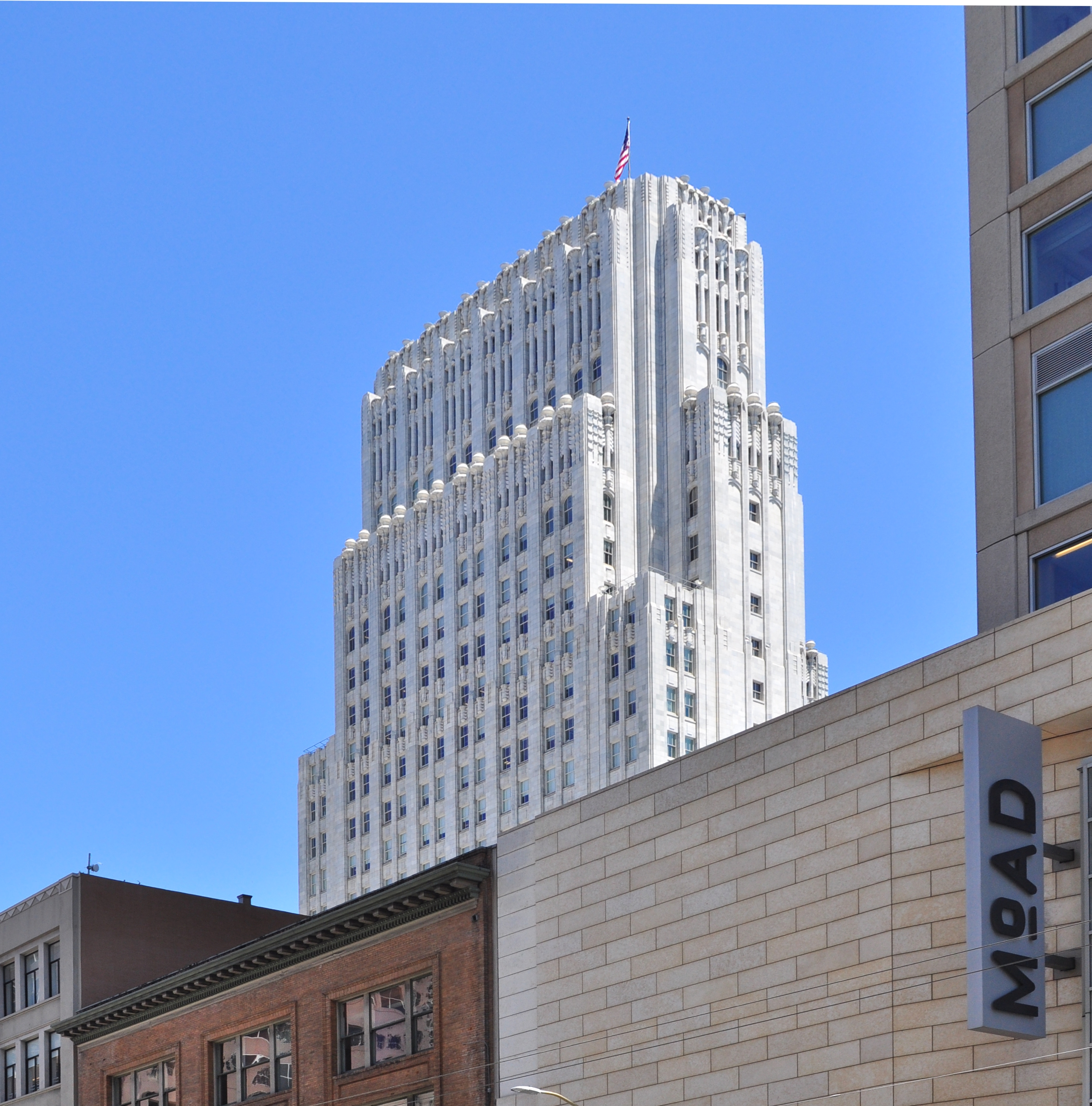
- Pacific Telesis' headquarters at 140 New Montgomery Street, as seen in 2017
- Type: Subsidiary
- Traded as: NYSE: PAC
- Industry: Telecommunications
- Predecessor: AT&T Corporation
- Founded: December 31, 1983; 42 years ago
- Defunct: December 29, 2006; 19 years ago
- Fate: Merged with AT&T and BellSouth
- Successor: AT&T Teleholdings
- Headquarters: 140 New Montgomery, San Francisco, California, United States
- Key people: Chuck Smith (former CEO); Ray Wilkins (former CEO)
- Products: Telephone, Internet, television
- Parent: AT&T Corporation (1983); AT&T (1997–2006)

Pacific Telesis Group (PacTel) was one of the seven Regional Bell Operating Companies, sometimes also referred to as "RBOCs" or "Baby Bells", created in 1983 in preparation of the breakup of AT&T Corporation. Pacific Telesis was the holding company for Pacific Bell, Nevada Bell, Pacific Telesis International, PacTel Mobile Services and PacTel InfoSystems. Pacific Telesis was headquartered in San Francisco and incorporated in Nevada. It was acquired by SBC Communications (the former Southwestern Bell) in 1997, which would eventually become today's AT&T Inc.

== Nicknames ==
Pacific Telesis is more commonly known as "Pac Bell". Prior to the January 1, 1984 breakup of the Bell System, the corporate name of its principal subsidiary Pacific Bell was the Pacific Telephone & Telegraph Company, which had also been referred to as "PacTel." After the corporate name change, Pacific Bell was commonly known as "PacBell."

The red and white star trademarked logo was referred to by company employees as the "splat", or more formally as the "access symbol" after the similar star key on a telephone keypad.

== Branded products ==
Pacific Telesis licensed rights to its name and the Bell name to Vodavi, who sold consumer telephones under the "PacTel" name. Vodavi manufactured PacTel telephones in South Korea to "Bell Specifications".

Pacific Telesis later licensed the Pacific Bell name to Thomson Consumer Electronics, who also produced telephone equipment for GE.

== Spinoffs ==
The cellular and paging unit of Pacific Telesis, PacTel Cellular, was spun off in 1994 into a new company called AirTouch Communications, leaving Pacific Telesis with only the landline telephone company. Senior Pacific Telesis management moved to AirTouch, thus leaving a new corporate culture to run the old Pacific Telesis. In 1999, AirTouch merged with Britain's Vodafone to become Vodafone AirTouch. In 2000, Vodafone's U.S. wireless assets were merged with those of Bell Atlantic to form the joint venture Verizon Wireless.

Later, when GSM technology became available, Pacific Bell Mobile Services was re-created, debuting in 1996 at the Republican National Convention in San Diego, California and being introduced to the public in 1997. After its public launch, the wireless division was renamed Pacific Bell Wireless and remained as such until the merger with SBC.

== Mergers ==
In 1997, Pacific Telesis Group was acquired by SBC Communications (renamed from Southwestern Bell Corporation) for $16.7 billion, and although the Pacific Telesis Group corporate name disappeared fairly quickly, SBC continued to operate the Pacific Bell and Nevada Bell local telephone companies separately under their original names.

In September 2001, SBC renamed the telephone companies "SBC Pacific Bell" and "SBC Nevada Bell". In late 2002, the companies were rebranded again as simply "SBC". Meanwhile, employees of SBC working in California and Nevada who supported SBC's non-regulated services and/or services provided both within and outside California were transferred to other SBC subsidiaries, like "Pacific Telesis Shared Services" and "SBC Operations, Inc." However, for legal and regulatory purposes, employees supporting local regulated services were still employed by "Pacific Bell Telephone Company dba SBC California ("SBC California")", and "Nevada Bell dba SBC Nevada", which were the SBC subsidiaries that provided regulated local telephone services within the franchise territory in California and Nevada.

On November 18, 2005, SBC completed its acquisition of AT&T Corp. to form AT&T Inc. Nevada and Pacific Bells are now known as Pacific Bell Telephone Company d/b/a AT&T California and Nevada Bell Telephone Company d/b/a AT&T Nevada. Pacific Telesis' companies as a whole business are known as AT&T West.

In 2006, the company was dissolved into AT&T Teleholdings, which is the current name of the former Baby Bell Ameritech.
