= Modification of Final Judgment =

Legal agreement in U.S. anti-trust litigation

In United States telecommunication law, the Modification of Final Judgment (MFJ) is the August 24, 1982 consent decree concerning the antitrust lawsuit of January 14, 1949, United States vs. Western Electric Company and American Telephone and Telegraph Company and its Final Judgment on January 24, 1956, the latter of which it vacated. The decree was made with Harold H. Greene as presiding judge in the United States District Court for the District of Columbia.

The terms required the breakup of the Bell System and a reorganization of the American Telephone and Telegraph Company (AT&T), including removing local telephone service from AT&T control and placing business restrictions on the divested regional telephone companies in exchange for removing other longstanding restrictions on the types of business AT&T could enter.

The MFJ also consolidated the case United States v. AT&T filed on November 20, 1974.
