= Breakup of the Bell System =

1982 US government action ending telephone monopoly

Telecommunications situation in the contiguous United States immediately following the Bell System's dissolution in 1984 Ameritech Bell Atlantic BellSouth Cincinnati Bell NYNEX Pacific Telesis Southern New England Telephone Southwestern Bell Corporation US West

The Bell System held a virtual monopoly over telephone infrastructure in the United States from around the early 20th century until January 8, 1982. It consisted of the parent American Telephone & Telegraph Company (AT&T), which directly provided long-distance service, while local service was provided by 24 local Bell Operating Companies, which were owned whole or in part by AT&T, while its manufacturing subsidiary Western Electric produced almost all of its equipment, which was largely designed at the research and development subsidiary Bell Labs. As a result, AT&T had substantial control over the United States' communications infrastructure.

The breakup of the system was initiated in 1974 when the United States Department of Justice filed United States v. AT&T, an antitrust lawsuit against AT&T. Relinquishing ownership of Western Electric was one of the Justice Department’s primary demands.

Believing that it was about to lose the suit, AT&T proposed an alternative: breaking up the Bell system. AT&T proposed a consent decree to relinquish control of the local Bell Operating Companies. AT&T would continue to be a provider of long-distance service and retain control of Western Electric, Bell Labs, the Yellow Pages directory services, and the Bell trademark. It also proposed that it be freed from a 1956 antitrust consent decree, then administered by Judge Vincent P. Biunno in the United States District Court for the District of New Jersey, that barred it from participating in the general sale of computers—a field to which Bell Labs had contributed significantly—and required it to depart from international markets (by relinquishing ownership in Bell Canada and Northern Electric, a former Western Electric subsidiary). In exchange, ownership of the local companies would be transferred to newly created, independent Regional Bell Operating Companies (RBOCs), nicknamed the "Baby Bells", which would no longer be required to obtain equipment from Western Electric. This last concession, AT&T argued, would achieve the government's goal of creating competition in supplying telephone equipment and supplies to the operating companies. The settlement was finalized on January 8, 1982, with some changes ordered by the decree court: the regional holding companies received the Bell trademark, the Yellow Pages, and half of Bell Labs.

The divesture of the local operating companies to the Baby Bells became effective on January 1, 1984. This divestiture reduced the book value of AT&T by approximately 70%.

== Post-breakup structure ==
The breakup of the Bell System resulted in the creation of seven independent companies that were formed from the original twenty-two AT&T-controlled members of the System.

On January 1, 1984, these companies and the local operating companies placed under them were:

- Ameritech
  - Illinois Bell
  - Indiana Bell
  - Michigan Bell
  - Ohio Bell
  - Wisconsin Bell
- Bell Atlantic
  - Bell of Pennsylvania
  - C&P Telephone
  - Diamond State Telephone
  - New Jersey Bell
- BellSouth
  - Southern Bell
  - South Central Bell
- NYNEX
  - New England Telephone
  - New York Telephone
- Pacific Telesis
  - Nevada Bell
  - Pacific Bell
- Southwestern Bell Corporation (known as SBC Communications after 1995)
  - Southwestern Bell
- US West
  - Mountain Bell
  - Northwestern Bell
  - Pacific Northwest Bell

In addition, there were two members of the Bell System that were only partially owned by AT&T. Both of these companies were monopolies in their coverage areas, received Western Electric equipment and had agreements with AT&T whereby they were provided with long-distance service. They continued to exist in their pre-breakup form after the antitrust case, but no longer automatically received Western Electric equipment, and were no longer bound to use AT&T as their long-distance provider. These companies were:

- Cincinnati Bell
- Southern New England Telephone (SNET)

== Remergers ==
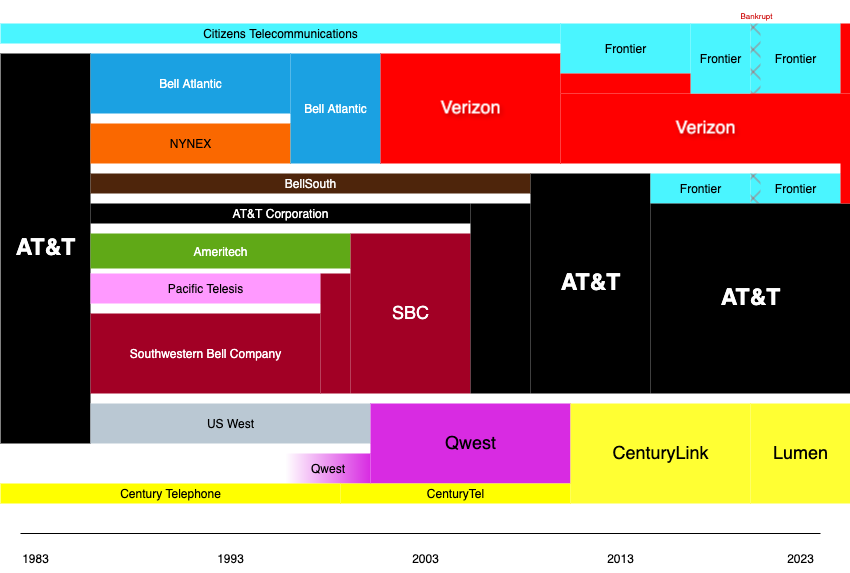
Breakup and subsequent mergers of the Bell System companies, as of 2026. Not shown: Cincinnati Bell (now Altafiber), FairPoint, and AT&T's 2026 acquisition of Lumen's mass-market broadband connectivity business.

Regulatory changes brought about by the Telecommunications Act of 1996 allowed the Baby Bells to merge with each other or with non-Bell companies. Subsequently, a series of mergers and divestments has left six companies owning parts of the former Bell System as of 2024.

- In 1996, Bell Atlantic acquired NYNEX
- In 1997, SBC acquired Pacific Telesis
- In 1998, SBC added SNET
- In 1999, Ameritech was acquired by SBC
- In 2000, Bell Atlantic acquired non-Bell company GTE and subsequently rebranded as Verizon Communications
- Also in 2000, US West was acquired by non-Bell company Qwest
- In 2005, SBC acquired former parent AT&T Corporation and took the AT&T name, becoming AT&T Inc.
- In 2006, BellSouth was acquired by AT&T Inc.
- In 2008, Verizon sold its operations in northern New England to FairPoint Communications
- In 2010, Verizon sold its West Virginia Bell operating company (along with much of its former GTE operations) to Frontier Communications
- In 2011, Qwest was acquired by CenturyLink, which subsequently changed its name to Lumen Technologies in 2020.
- In 2014, Frontier acquired the former SNET operations of AT&T.
- In 2017, FairPoint was acquired by Consolidated Communications
- In 2020, Cincinnati Bell changed its trade name to Altafiber
- In 2025, Consolidated Communications changed its trade name to Fidium Fiber
- In 2026, Verizon purchased Frontier Communications. This includes most former GTE areas, SNET and select divested Bell Atlantic areas. Many of these areas have been part of Verizon in the past, while SBC/AT&T owned SNET.
- Also in 2026, AT&T purchased the mass-market fiber assets of Lumen Technologies. This encompasses many former US West areas and select non-Bell lines. This acquisition does not include Lumen's mass-market copper, wholesale or enterprise businesses, and Lumen remains the ILEC.

== Effects ==
The breakup led to a surge of competition in the long-distance telecommunications market by companies such as Sprint and MCI. AT&T's gambit in exchange for its divestiture, AT&T Computer Systems, failed, and after spinning off its manufacturing operations (most notably Western Electric, which became Lucent, then Alcatel-Lucent, now Nokia) and other misguided acquisitions such as NCR and AT&T Broadband, it was left with only its core business with roots as AT&T Long Lines and its successor AT&T Communications. It was at this point that AT&T was purchased by one of its own spin-offs, SBC Communications, the company that had also purchased two other RBOCs (Ameritech, Pacific Telesis) and a former AT&T associated operating company (SNET), which later purchased another RBOC (BellSouth) and subsequently select lines of another (US West, now Lumen).

One consequence of the breakup was that local residential service rates, which were formerly subsidized by long-distance revenues, began to rise faster than the rate of inflation. Long-distance rates, meanwhile, fell both due to the end of this subsidy and increased competition. The FCC established a system of access charges where long-distance networks paid the more expensive local networks both to originate and terminate a call. In this way, the implicit subsidies of the Bell System became explicit post-divestiture. These access charges became a source of strong controversy as one company after another sought to arbitrage the network and avoid these fees. In 2002 the FCC declared that Internet service providers would be treated as if they were local and would not have to pay these access charges. This led to VoIP service providers arguing that they did not have to pay access charges, resulting in significant savings for VoIP calls. The FCC was split on this issue for some time; VoIP services that used IP but in every other way looked like a normal phone call generally had to pay access charges, while VoIP services that looked more like applications on the Internet and did not interconnect with the public telephone network did not have to pay access charges. However, an FCC order issued in December 2011 declared that all VoIP services would have to pay the charges for nine years, at which point all access charges would then be phased out.

Another consequence of the divestiture was in how both national broadcast television (i.e., ABC, NBC, CBS, PBS) and radio networks (NPR, Mutual, ABC Radio) distributed their programming to their local affiliated stations. Prior to the breakup, the broadcast networks relied on AT&T Long Lines' infrastructure of terrestrial microwave relay, coaxial cable, and, for radio, broadcast-quality leased line networks to deliver their programming to local stations. However, by the mid-1970s, the then-new technology of satellite distribution offered by other companies like RCA Astro Electronics and Western Union, with their respective Satcom 1 and Westar 1 satellites, started to give the Bell System competition in the broadcast distribution field, with the satellites providing higher video and audio quality, as well as much lower transmission costs.

However, the networks stayed with AT&T (along with simulcasting their feeds via satellite through the late 1970s to the early 1980s) due to some stations not being equipped yet with ground station receiving equipment to receive the networks' satellite feeds, and due to the broadcast networks' contractual obligations with AT&T up until the breakup in 1984, when the networks immediately switched to satellite exclusively. This was due to several reasons — the much cheaper rates for transmission offered by satellite operators that were not influenced by the high tariffs set by AT&T for broadcast customers, the split of the Bell System into separate RBOCs, and the end of contracts that the broadcast companies had with AT&T.

AT&T was allowed to enter the computer market after the breakup; observers expected that with Bell Labs and Western Electric, American Bell would challenge market leader IBM. The company's post-breakup strategy did not work out the way it had planned. Its attempt to enter the computer business failed, and it quickly realized that Western Electric was not profitable without the guaranteed customers the Bell System had provided. In 1995, AT&T spun off its computer division and Western Electric, exactly as the government had initially asked it to do. It then re-entered the local telephone business that it had exited after the breakup, which had become much more lucrative with the rise of dial-up Internet access in the early 1990s. Even this, however, would not save AT&T Corporation. It would soon be absorbed by one of the Baby Bells, SBC Communications (formerly Southwestern Bell), which then co-opted the AT&T name to form the present-day AT&T Inc.

== Evolution of the Baby Bells ==
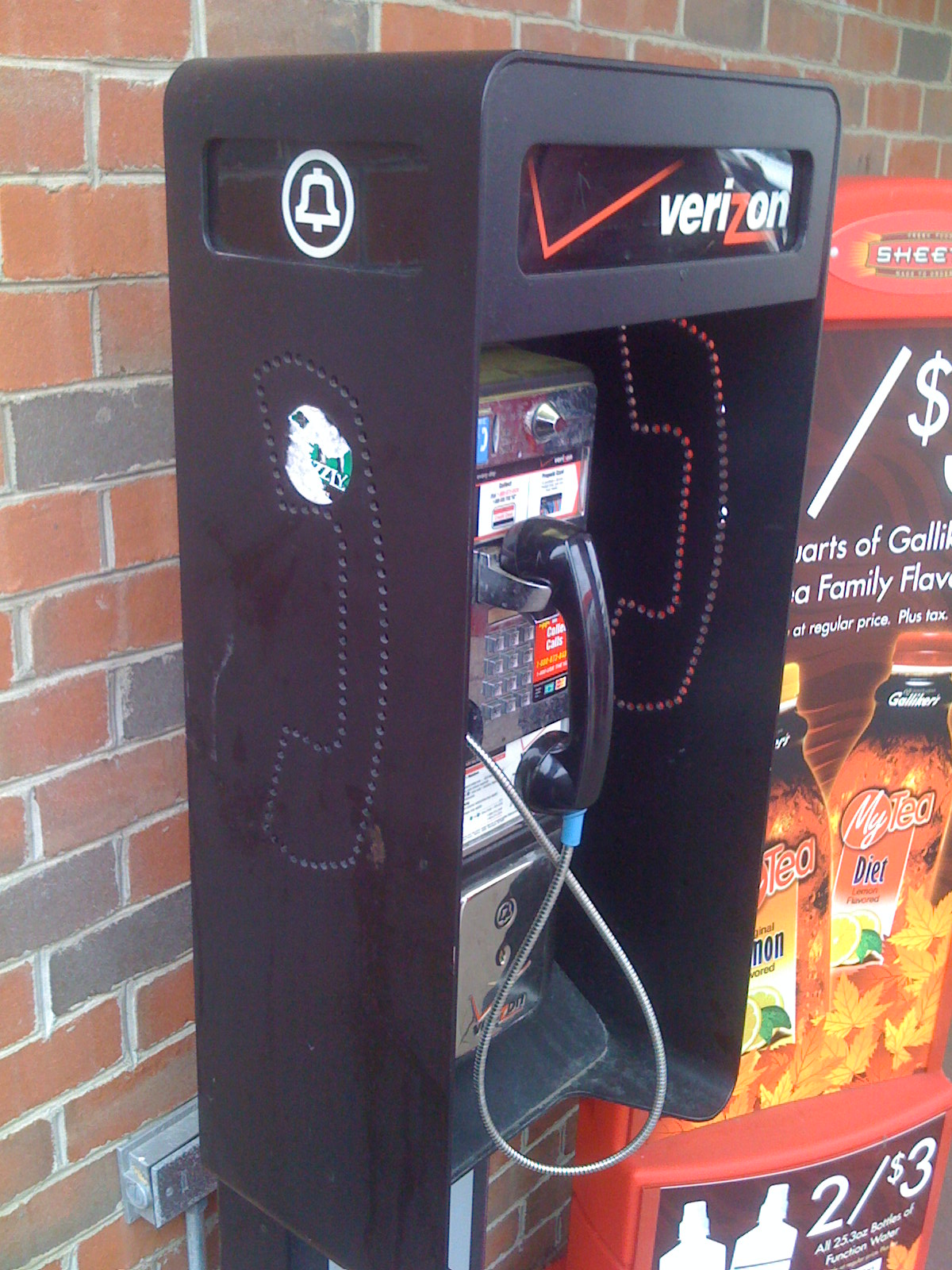
A Verizon payphone with the Bell logo

Following divestiture in 1984 and the creation of the seven Baby Bells, the service within the LATAs remained regulated until 1996, when the Telecommunications Act of 1996 was passed. Following this, the Baby Bells began consolidating among themselves. Section 271 of the Telecommunications Act of 1996 also established a way that regulators could approve BOCs to enter the interLATA market in regions where they provide local exchange service. In 1998, Ameritech sold some of its Wisconsin Bell lines (covering 19 exchanges) to CenturyTel, which merged them into its company CenturyTel of the Midwest-Kendall.

SBC Communications (named Southwestern Bell Corporation until 1995) purchased Pacific Telesis in 1997 for $16.5 billion, creating an organization with about 100,000 employees, an annual net income of $3 billion, and revenue of about $23.5 billion. SBC purchased Southern New England Telecommunications in 1998 for $5.01 billion, and Ameritech in 1999 for $61 billion, creating the largest U.S. local phone company at the time. AT&T Corporation, the original parent, was acquired effective November 18, 2005, by SBC, which renamed itself AT&T Inc. and began using the ticker symbol "T" and a new AT&T corporate logo. The new company then acquired BellSouth for $85.8 billion on January 3, 2007, with FCC approval.

Bell Atlantic merged with NYNEX on August 18, 1997, in a $25.6 billion deal, retaining the name Bell Atlantic, and then with non-Bell GTE on June 30, 2000, to create Verizon Communications in a $70 billion deal. Verizon sold all of its wireline operations in northern New England (Maine, New Hampshire, and Vermont) in 2008 to FairPoint Communications for $2.7 billion; a new operating company, Northern New England Telephone Operations, was created. Operations in Vermont were later split into Telephone Operating Company of Vermont, but continued with FairPoint. In 2010, Verizon sold 4.8 million access lines in 14 states, including Verizon West Virginia (originally The Chesapeake and Potomac Telephone Company of West Virginia), to Frontier Communications. In 2025, Verizon was approved by the FCC to purchase Frontier Communications in a $20 billion deal. This acquisition was completed on January 20, 2026.

US West was acquired by Qwest in June 2000 for $43.5 billion. On April 6, 2011, Qwest was acquired by CenturyLink (now Lumen Technologies), an independent telephone provider, bringing Qwest Corporation (originally Mountain Bell), Northwestern Bell, and Pacific Northwest Bell under its control. In February 2026, Lumen Technologies sold its fiber-to-the-home business to AT&T for $5.75 billion, although Lumen retains the copper, wholesale and enterprise businesses, as well as the ILEC operating companies. This sale is in some fashion similar to the now-abandoned Unbundled network elements, except that AT&T maintains the physical plant instead of Lumen.

While based in San Antonio, Texas, since 1992, AT&T Inc. moved its headquarters to Dallas by the end of 2008. The name change came after AT&T's merger with BellSouth, as well as with southeast-region telephone operations. Bedminster, New Jersey, is home to the AT&T Global Network Operations Center and is the headquarters of AT&T Corp., the long-distance subsidiary of AT&T Inc. The new AT&T Inc. lacks the vertical integration that characterized the historic AT&T Corporation and led to the Department of Justice antitrust suit. AT&T Inc. announced it would not switch back to the Bell logo, thus ending corporate use of the Bell logo by the Baby Bells, with the lone exception of Verizon.

== Financial arbitrage ==
Due to discrepancies between the pricing of the "old" AT&T shares and the new "when-issued" shares, investors were able to make risk-free profits, most spectacularly Edward O. Thorp, who made $2.5 million in what was at the time the NYSE's largest (nominal) block trade.

== See also ==
- United States antitrust law
- Standard Oil – The 1911 breakup of Standard Oil is often compared to the breakup of AT&T and, like AT&T, later had many "baby Standards" merge.
- AT&T Technologies
