= Regional Bell Operating Company =

U.S. regional telephone company created by 1984 break of AT&T

The service areas of the Regional Bell Operating Companies in the contiguous United States following the Bell System's dissolution in 1984 Ameritech Bell Atlantic BellSouth Cincinnati Bell NYNEX Pacific Telesis Southern New England Telephone Southwestern Bell Corporation US West

A Regional Bell Operating Company (RBOC) was a corporate entity created as result of the antitrust lawsuit by the United States Department of Justice against the Western Electric Company and American Telephone and Telegraph Company (AT&T) in 1949 and a suit in 1974 against AT&T (United States v. AT&T). The suits were settled in the Modification of Final Judgment in August 1982.

AT&T agreed to divest its local exchange service operating companies, effective January 1, 1984. The group of local operating companies were split into seven independent Regional Bell Operating Companies, which became known as the Baby Bells.

Three companies still exist that have an RBOC as a predecessor: AT&T, Verizon, and Lumen Technologies (formerly CenturyTel and CenturyLink). Some other companies hold smaller segments of the companies.

== Baby Bells ==
A "Baby Bell" is a local telephone company in the United States that was in existence at the time of the breakup of AT&T into the resulting Regional Bell Operating Companies (RBOCs). Sometimes also referred to as an "ILEC" (Incumbent Local Exchange Carrier) they were the former Bell System or Independent Telephone Company responsible for providing local telephone exchange services in a specified geographic area.

After the Modification of Final Judgment, the resulting Baby Bells were originally named:

- Ameritech
- Bell Atlantic
- BellSouth
- NYNEX
- Pacific Telesis
- Southwestern Bell
- US West

Prior to 1984, AT&T Corp. also held investments in two smaller and otherwise independent companies, Cincinnati Bell and Southern New England Telephone (SNET). Following the 1984 breakup, these became fully independent as well. All nine local-exchange holding companies were assigned a share of the rights to the Bell trademark.

=== Shared trademarks ===
The Bell System logo and trademark as it appeared in 1969

After divestiture, AT&T Corp. was prohibited from using the Bell name or logo (with the notable exception of AT&T's Bell Laboratories) and those trademarks which would be shared by the RBOCs and the two companies AT&T partially owned. Cincinnati Bell was the last RBOC to hold the "Bell" name, but it rebranded as Altafiber in March of 2022.

Additionally, Bell Canada, the former Bell Telephone Company of Canada (founded in 1880) and which started separating from the Bell System in 1956, and completely by 1975, continues to use the "Bell" trademarks, which it owns outright in Canada.

Verizon continued to use the Bell logo on its payphones (including former GTE payphones), hard hats, trucks, and buildings, most likely intending to display continued use in order to maintain the company's trademark rights. Following the company updating its logo in 2015 and subsequent reimaging of its trucks, the Bell logo has since been removed.

Malheur Bell, an autonomous local phone company owned by Qwest, used the Bell name and logo until its merger into Qwest in 2009.

Apart from historical documents, AT&T does not presently make active use of the Bell marks. Its local exchange companies have retained the "Bell" names; however, they have been doing business under other names since 2002. Many of these names are still listed with the US Patent and Trademark Office as current trademarks, since these names are still considered in use.

== Mergers ==
Many of these companies have since merged; by the end of 2000, there were only three of the original Baby Bells left in the United States. After the 1984 breakup, part of AT&T Corp.'s Bell Labs was split off into Bellcore, which would serve as an R&D and standards body for the seven Baby Bells. In 1997, Bellcore was acquired by Science Applications International Corporation where it became a wholly owned subsidiary and was renamed Telcordia.

AT&T Corporation; RBOC grouped into "Baby Bells" split off in 1984
BellSouth	AT&T Corporation (non-LEC)	Ameritech	Pacific Telesis	Southwestern Bell (later SBC Communications)	Bell Atlantic	NYNEX	US West
GTE (non-RBOC ILEC)	Qwest (non-ILEC)
Verizon
AT&T (former SBC)
CenturyLink (non-RBOC ILEC)
AT&T	Verizon	Lumen Technologies

=== AT&T Inc. ===
Southwestern Bell Corporation, which changed its name to SBC Communications in 1995, acquired Pacific Telesis in 1997, SNET in 1998, and Ameritech in 1999. In February 2005, SBC announced its plans to acquire former parent company AT&T Corp. for over $16 billion. SBC took on the AT&T name upon merger closure on November 18, 2005. SBC began trading as AT&T Inc. on December 1, 2005, but began re-branding as early as November 21 of the same year. In 2006 AT&T Inc. purchased BellSouth.

=== Verizon Communications ===
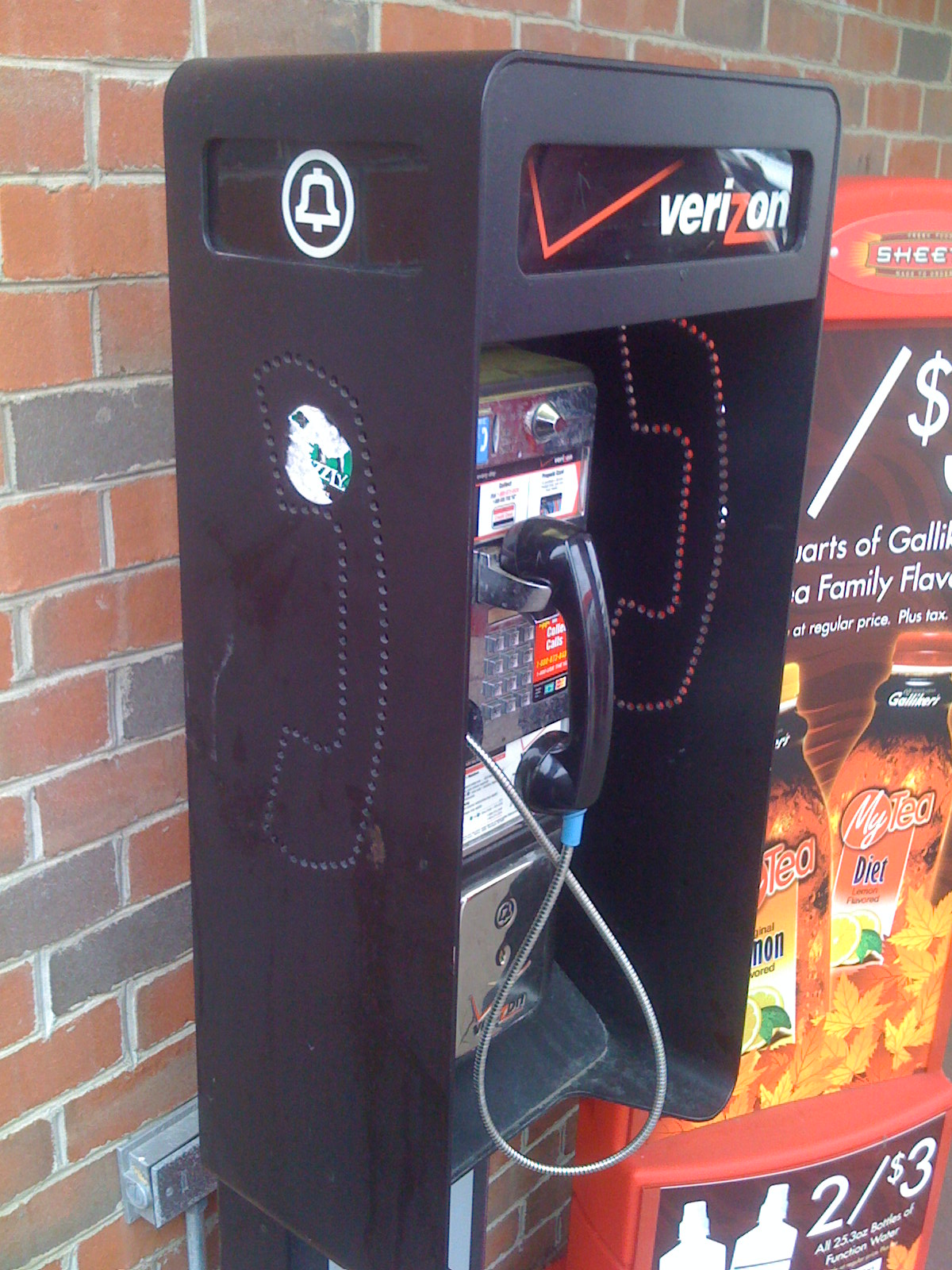
A Verizon payphone with the Bell logo

In 1997, NYNEX was acquired by Bell Atlantic (taking the Bell Atlantic name), which later, in 2000, acquired GTE, the largest independent telephone company. Bell Atlantic later changed its name to Verizon that same year.

In 2005, following a protracted bidding war with rival RBOC Qwest, Verizon announced that it would acquire long-distance company MCI. The Verizon and MCI merger closed on January 6, 2006.

Bell Atlantic Mobile became the largest wireless carrier in the United States through its merger with NYNEX Mobile, its acquisition of Frontier Cellular, its subsequent merger with GTE Wireless, and its joint venture with Vodafone (consolidating its AirTouch business into Bell Atlantic Mobile). The latter two transactions effectively formed Verizon Wireless (which remained a partnership between Verizon Communications and Vodafone until 2013). The company has largely maintained its lead over the years through further acquisitions (notably, of Alltel Wireless and TracFone) and through organic growth. surpassing T-Mobile and even AT&T in wireless. Over time much of its wireline area was spun off including northern New England to Consolidated Communications and other areas with landline businesses to both Frontier Communications and FairPoint Communications. In 2024, Verizon announced it will acquire Frontier Communications in a $20 billion deal. The acquisition was approved by the FCC in May 2025.

=== Lumen Technologies, Inc. ===
Lumen Technologies, Inc. was originally Century Telephone (CenturyTel), and took the CenturyLink name in 2009 when it acquired Embarq, the former local operations of Sprint Nextel, which also included the former operations of Centel. The company, as CenturyTel, had acquired some Wisconsin Bell lines from Ameritech in 1998.

Qwest, a Denver-based fiber optics long-distance company, had taken over US West in 2000. CenturyLink announced in April 2010 its intent to buy Qwest for US$10.6 billion. The transaction was completed in April 2011. In August 2011, the Qwest branding was retired and replaced by that of CenturyLink. CenturyLink rebranded to Lumen Technologies in September 2020.

In May 2025, AT&T announced the purchase of Lumen Technologies' mass-market connectivity business. Following the transaction, Lumen will concentrate on serving business, enterprise and cloud customers. Lumen will also retain its legacy copper-based telephone network which has only a few remaining customers and is slated for retirement in the upcoming years.

== Other related companies ==
=== Altafiber ===
The former independent Bell System franchisee Cincinnati Bell, which was not part of the 1984 divestiture because AT&T held only a minority stake in the company, remains independent of the RBOCs. In December 2019, Cincinnati Bell announced that Brookfield Infrastructure Partners would acquire the company for $2.6 billion. On September 7, 2021, Macquarie Infrastructure and Real Assets completed its purchase of Cincinnati Bell, Inc. and later rebranded the company name to Altafiber.

=== Fidium Fiber ===
FairPoint Communications, an independent provider based in North Carolina, acquired Northern New England Telephone Operations. NNETO is an operating company split from the original New England Telephone to serve access lines in Maine and New Hampshire. The sale of these lines by Verizon to FairPoint closed in 2008. Telephone Operating Company of Vermont, a company created following FairPoint's acquisition, was an operating company wholly owned by Northern New England Telephone Operations. In December 2016 FairPoint was purchased by Consolidated Communications, and the combined company operates under the Fidium Fiber name.

=== Frontier Communications ===
In 2010, Frontier Communications acquired Frontier West Virginia, one of the original Bell Operating Companies formerly known as the Chesapeake and Potomac Telephone Company of West Virginia, in a larger deal including some former GTE companies with Verizon Communications. In December 2013, AT&T agreed to sell SNET to Frontier, with the sale closing in the second half of 2014. On April 1, 2016, Frontier Communications (FTR) completed the data conversions from the Verizon systems for the remaining three largest former GTE properties: California, Florida and Texas. On May 1, 2020, Frontier Communications (FTR) completed the sale of its Northwest Regional companies of Idaho, Montana, Oregon and Washington to Ziply Fiber in an effort to avoid Chapter 11 bankruptcy. This move did not solve Frontier Communications financial problems resulting in a Chapter 11 Bankruptcy filing on April 14, 2020. Frontier went public again on May 4, 2021, with FYBR as its trading symbol on NASDAQ, after changing its name to "Frontier Communications Parent". In 2024, Verizon announced it will purchase Frontier for $20 billion. The FCC approved the acquisition in May 2025. The acquisition closed on January 20, 2026.

== See also ==
- Breakup of the Bell System
- Competitive local exchange carrier (CLEC)
- Incumbent local exchange carrier (ILEC)
- Local access and transport area (LATA)
