= Program on Information Resources Policy =

Research program at harvard university

The Program on Information Resources Policy (PIRP) was a research program at Harvard University, sometimes referred to informally as "Harvard's think tank on the information age." See for a complete explanation. It was established on February 1, 1973 by Anthony Oettinger and John LeGates and closed on June 30, 2011 by the same principals. It worked in the realm of communications and information resources. At most points in its history it employed as many as 15 full-time staffers, mostly professionals, as well as hosting various visiting scholars and sponsored researchers over the years. At any given time it was supported by about 100 different public and private organizations.

During the 1980s the principals of PIRP, in addition to Oettinger and LeGates, included John F. McLaughin, who headed areas of postal policy as well as national security issues; Benjamin Compaine, who directed areas of the media and literacy; and Oswald H. Ganley, who focused on international issues such as transborder data flows.

As is typical for an academic program, it offered courses and seminars, but it also produced more than 500 book-length reports, most after reviews from industry, government and academia. However, its principal goal was to aid industry, government and public decision makers with sound reasoning and with information that was both impartial and competent. For that mission it developed research and dissemination methods that were innovative and unique.

== How the program worked ==
In the words of the Program:

- We deal mainly with controversial matters of continuing relevance.
- We work on emerging issues in the middle time range—a focus close enough for the issues to be of concern to real stakeholders and remote enough for outcomes to be open.
- We lay out the essentials of controversies but do not take sides, make recommendations, or attempt to predict the future.
- We forego relationships that might bias us—such as consulting, partisan expert testimony, or membership on corporate boards.
- We operate with diversified financial support from stakeholders in the controversies worked on.
- Our work is reviewed by these stakeholders and by members of the relevant professions and disciplines.
- All our work is available to the public. Everyone knows in advance that this is so.
- Our work is neither proprietary nor classified. We neither work toward external deadlines nor respond to requests for proposals (RFPs).
- We aspire to intellectual, financial, and institutional stability regardless of the ins and outs of fashions and incumbencies.

The Program held itself as being both impartial and competent.

Since the nature of the program meant it dealt with contentious policy debates, Oettinger and LeGates were concerned that accepting funding from certain sources would threaten the credibility of the research. To address this concern, they devised a funding plan that sought small sums from many competing stakeholders in the information industries. They explained this model of funding by stating "Being bought by everybody, we are bought by nobody." All operations were funded by "Affiliates" that provided contributions, usually on an annual basis, that went into a blended "pot." The Principals made the determination what research to undertake, aiming to build knowledge for use when and where it's needed. It never accepted funds from any source that would be designated for a specific research project. Whether a contributing affiliate or not, "We do not take sides—in any form. We are in the business of description, not prescription. We map the territory—you position your forces."

To address the goal of competence, PIRP established process of continuous fact-finding and written analysis. It created a "vetting" procedure for all its published research. A first draft would be circulated among Affiliates as well as outsiders who might have relevant expertise. Among the questions they were typically asked might be: Do we have the facts straight? Have we presented the position of your industry or your agency accurately? Have we unearthed the critical controversies?

The Program's primary avenue for disseminating its research was through its approximately 500 publications. Most were extensively reviewed by both disciplinary experts and by stakeholders in the topics under discussion. Full texts of almost all are available on the Program website.

However, PIRP's objective was to make the information it developed available to decision makers in real time. This was most often accomplished by face–to-face meetings, usually with senior people in the affiliates. One customary format would be for the affiliate to describe its major uncertainties. The Program's Principal's would respond with whatever they knew that might be relevant. The hoped-for result, if any, would be better information and thinking for the affiliate. Although Program Principals did not sign nondisclosure agreements, it assured those with whom they met confidentiality. Program Principals also disseminated its findings and analysis through testimony and presentations, when requested, to Federal and state policymakers as well as in other public forums.

== Financial supporters/work affiliates ==
Over the duration of the program, approximately 400 affiliate organization provided funding for its endeavors. They included industry players, government agencies, non-profit organizations, trade associations and advocacy groups in the U.S., Canada and globally. It worked closely with those and many others. Here is the complete list over the 38 years of its operations:

- ABRH Consulting
- Abt Associates
- Action for Children's Television
- Advertising Mail Marketing Association
- Aetna Life & Casualty
- American Broadcasting Company
- American Can Company
- American District Telegraph
- American Management Systems
- American Newspaper Publishers Association
- American Telephone & Telegraph
- Ameritech
- Ameritech Publishing
- Anderson, Benjamin & Read
- Anderson, Benjamin, Read & Haney
- Anonymous Startup
- Apple Inc
- Applied Telecommunications Technologies
- Arthur D. Little
- Association of American Publishers
- AT&T Corporation
- AT&T Information Systems
- Auerbach Publishers
- Australian & Overseas Telecommunications Corp (Australia)
- Australian Telecommunications Users Group (Australia)
- Automated Marketing Systems
- A.H. Belo
- Bell Atlantic
- Bell Canada
- Bell Telephone Company of Pennsylvania
- BellSouth
- Beneficial Management Corporation
- Berner & Berner
- The Boeing Company
- Boice Dunham Group
- Albert Bonniers Forlag (Sweden)
- Booth Newspapers
- Booz Allen Hamilton
- Boston Broadcasters
- The Boston Globe
- Braxton Associates
- Bunker Ramo Corporation
- Bull, S.A. (France)
- Burroughs Corporation
- Business Information Publishing Co
- Cable & Wireless (UK)
- Canada Post (Canada)
- Carvajal S.A. (Colombia)
- CBS Broadcast Group
- CBS
- Cellular One
- Centel Corporation
- Center for Excellence in Education
- Central Telephone & Utilities Corp
- Centro Studi San Salvador, Telecom Italia (Italy)
- Channel Four Television Corporation (UK)
- Chronicle Broadcasting Company
- CIRCIT at RMIT (Australia)
- Citibank
- CMC (India)
- Codex Corp
- The College Board
- Commission of the European Communities (Europe)
- Common Cause
- Communications Workers of America
- Computer & Communications Industry Association
- Computer Industry Association
- Computer Intelligence
- COMSAT
- Consolidated Edison
- Continental Cablevision
- Continental Graphics
- Continental Telecom
- Continental Telephone
- Coopers & Lybrand
- Copley Newspapers
- Corning Inc
- Cowles Media Company
- Cox Enterprises
- CSC Indexx (Europe)
- CyberMedia Convergence Consulting
- CyraCom International
- DACOM (Korea)
- Dai-Ichi Kangyo Bank (Japan)
- Databit
- Data America Corporation
- Data Communications Corp. of Korea (Korea)
- Data Transmission Company
- Deloitte & Touche
- Department of Communications (Australia)
- Department of Communications (Canada)
- Des Moines Register and Tribune Co.
- Dialog Corp.
- Dialog Information Services
- Digital Equipment Corporation
- Direction Générale des Télécommuications (France)
- Diversified Communications
- Donaldson, Lufkin and Jenrette
- Doubleday
- Dow Jones & Company
- Drexel Burnham Lambert
- DRI/McGraw Hill
- Dun & Bradstreet
- Economics and Technology
- Educational Testing Service
- EG&G
- EIC/Intelligence
- Ellacoya Networks
- Elsevier Science Publishers (Netherlands)
- Encyclopædia Britannica
- Equifax
- Ericsson (Sweden)
- ESL Incorporated
- ETRI (Korea)
- European Parliament (Europe)
- Exxon Enterprises
- eYak
- FaxNet
- Federal Reserve Bank of Boston
- Field Enterprises
- First Data
- First National Bank of Boston
- First National Bank of Chicago
- France Telecom (France)
- Frost & Sullivan
- Fujitsu Research Institute (Japan)
- Gannett
- Gartner
- General Electric
- General Motors
- General Telephone & Electronics
- GNB Technologies
- Grupo Clarin (Argentina)
- GTE
- Hallmark Cards
- Hambrecht & Quist
- Hanaro Telecom Corp. (Korea)
- Harper & Row
- Harte-Hanks Communications
- Harvard University
- Hazel Associates
- R.A. Hearst
- Hearst Newspapers
- High Acre Systems
- Hitachi Research Institute (Japan)
- Honeywell
- Household Finance Corporation
- Hughes Aircraft Co.
- Hughes Communication Services
- E. F. Hutton and Co.
- IBM
- Illinois Bell
- IQ Inc
- Information Gatekeepers
- Information Industry Association
- Intel Corp.
- Interconsult
- International Data Corporation
- International Monetary Fund
- International Paper
- International Paper Company
- International Resource Development
- International Telecommunications Satellite Organization (Intelsat)
- International Telephone & Telegraph Corp
- Interpublic Group of Companies
- Investment Company Institute
- Invoco AB Gunnar Bergvall (Sweden)
- Iran Communications and Development Institute (Iran)
- Irving Trust Co.
- IT Direction (UK)
- Italtel (Italy)
- Japan Telecom (Japan)
- Kapor Family Foundation
- Kavner & Associates
- Knight-Ridder Information
- Knowledge Industry Publications
- Kokusai Denshin Denwa Co (Japan)
- Korea Telecom (Korea)
- Korea Mobile Telecom (Korea)
- Korean Information Society Development Institute
- KPN (Netherlands)
- Lee Enterprises
- Lexis-Nexis
- Eli Lilly and Company
- Lincoln Laboratory
- LiTel Telecommunications
- Litton Industries
- Lockheed Missiles and Space Company
- Lotus Development
- Lucent Technologies
- Marstellar Foundation
- Martin Marietta
- Markle Foundation
- McCann North America
- McCaw Cellular Communications
- McGraw-Hill
- MCI Telecommunications
- McKinsey & Company
- Mead Corporation
- Mead Data Central
- MediaOne Group
- MeesPierson (UK)
- Merck & Co
- Meredith Corporation
- Microsoft
- MicroUnity
- Ministry of Communications (Canada)
- Minneapolis Star and Tribune
- Mitre Corporation
- Motorola
- National Association of Letter Carriers
- National Computer Board (Singapore)
- National Security Research
- National Telephone Cooperative Association
- NCR Corporation
- NEC (Japan)
- NEST – Boston
- New York Times
- New England Telephone
- New Jersey Bell
- Newspaper Association of America
- Nippon Electric Co. (Japan)
- Nippon Telegraph & Telephone (Japan)
- NMC/Northwestern University
- Norfolk & Southern Railway
- Norfolk & Western Railway
- North Communications
- Northeast Consulting Resources
- Northern Telecom (Canada)
- Northrop Corporation
- Nova Systems
- NYNEX
- Ohio Bell
- Ing. C. Olivetti & Co., S.p.A. (Italy)
- Oppenheimer Holdings
- Overseas Telecommunications Commission (Australia)
- The Overseas Telecommunications Commission (Australia)
- Pacific Bell
- Pacific Bell Directory
- Pacific Telesis Group
- Payment Systems
- PDS Consulting
- Pearson Longman (United Kingdom)
- JC Penney
- Pergamon Press (United Kingdom)
- PetaData Holdings (Bermuda)
- Philips Kommunikations (Netherlands)
- Pitney Bowes
- Planning Research Corporation
- Polaroid Foundation
- The Post Office (UK)
- PRC Information Sciences Company
- Public Agenda Foundation
- Puerto Rico Telephone Co. (Puerto Rico)
- Qwest Communications International
- Reader's Digest Association
- Raytheon Company
- RCA Corporation
- RCA Global Communications
- Research Institute of Telecommunications and Economics (Japan)
- RESEAU (Italy)
- Revista Nacional de Telematica (Brazil)
- Reuters (UK)
- Rhode Island Public Utilities Commission
- Rizzoli Corriere della Sera (Italy)
- Rockefeller Brothers Fund
- Rockwell International
- Royal Bank of Canada (Canada)
- Saint Phalle International Group
- St Petersburg Times
- St Regis Paper Co
- Salomon Brothers
- Samara Associates
- Satellite Business Systems
- Scaife Family Charitable Trusts
- Scientifica-Atlanta
- Scott & Fetzer Co.
- SEAT (Italy)
- Seiden & de Cuevas
- Siemens (Germany)
- SK Telecom (Korea)
- Skadden, Arps, Slate, Meagher & Flom
- Sonexis
- Source Telecomputing Corp
- Southam Inc. (Canada)
- Southern California Edison
- Southern New England Telecommunications
- Southern Pacific Communications
- Southern Railway System
- Southwestern Bell Corp
- Sprague Electric Company
- Sprint Communications
- Standard Shares
- State of California Public Utilities Commission
- State of Minnesota Funding
- State of Nebraska Telecommunications and Information Center
- Strategy Assistance Services
- Stromberg-Carlson Corporation
- Swedish Television (Sweden)
- Swiss Bank Corporation (Switzerland)
- Systems Applications
- Teknibank (Italy)
- Telecom Australia (Australia)
- Telecom Futures
- Telecom Plus International
- Telecommunications Research Action Center (TRAC)
- Telemation Management Group
- Telematix International (Belgium)
- Telesat Canada (Canada)
- Tele/Scope Daily
- Tele/Scope Networks
- Telstra (Australia)
- TFS, Inc.
- Third Class Mail Association
- Thomson Professional Publishing
- Time Inc
- Times Mirror Company
- Times Publishing Company
- TOR LLC
- The Toronto Star (Canada)
- Torstar (Canada)
- Transamerica Corporation
- TransMedia Exchange
- Tribune Company
- TRW Inc
- UBS Brinson (Switzerland)
- UNIEMP (Brazil)
- United Air Lines
- United Parcel Service
- United States Government
  - Central Intelligence Agency
  - Department of Commerce
    - National Oceanic & Atmospheric Administration
    - National Technical Information Service
    - National Telecommunications and Information Administration
    - Office of Telecommunications
  - Department of Defense
    - Defense Communications Agency
    - Defense Intelligence Agency
    - Defense Technical Information Center
    - National Defense University
    - Office of the Under Secretary of Defense for Policy
  - Department of Energy
  - Department of Health & Human Services
    - National Library of Medicine
  - Department of the Treasury
    - Office of the Comptroller of the Currency
  - Department of State
    - Office of Communications
  - Executive Office of the President
    - Office of Telecommunications Policy
  - Federal Communications Commission
  - Federal Emergency Management Agency
  - General Services Administration
  - Internal Revenue Service
  - NASA
  - National Communications System
  - National Security Agency
  - United States Army
    - Office of the Assistant Chief of Staff for Information Management
  - Government Accountability Office
  - United States Information Agency
  - United States Postal Rate Commission
  - United States Postal Service
- Upoc
- United Telecommunications
- US - Japan Foundation
- US Media Group
- US West
- Vanguard Technology Corporation of America
- Venturist
- Verizon
- Veronis, Suhler & Associates
- Viacom Broadcasting
- Videosoft Solutions
- Visa
- Voice of America
- Warner Amex Cable Communications
- Warner Communications
- Washington Post
- Western Union
- Weyerhaeuser
- Williams Telecommunications
- Wolters Kluwer (Netherlands)
- Wolters Samson Group (Netherlands)
- Xerox
- Zenith Electronics

== Reviews and compliments ==
The impact of the Program is hard to measure directly: How can it be determined that organizations made better decisions? One metric would the breadth and continuity of the financial support (see list of affiliates). Another would be quotable feedback and praise from the people with whom the program worked. Here are some samples. (A longer list is at.) :

In my view, you and your group are more significant than anyone else in the information age turning out so well. Ivan Seidenberg, Chairman and CEO, Verizon, 2012

My Federal Agency is only a year old as of yesterday, but it owes some of the impetus for its formation to spade work begun by Mr. Oettinger, Mr. LeGates and your colleagues for the past several years.... Your Program has also been a source of important substantive ideas and insights. I myself have cribbed shamelessly.... Ambassador John E. Reinhardt, Director, International Communications Agency, 1979

A Nobel Prize should be created in Communications and Information so that The Program at Harvard can be awarded it (Comment published). Andrew Aines, Director of the Defense Science and Technical Information Program (Department of Defense)

I wish I had discovered this place two years ago before I went to the FCC. I'm sure I could have had two more productive years had I had a chance to talk to you beforehand. Anne Jones, Commissioner, Federal Communications Commission, 1981

You are like a breath of fresh air blowing through a miasma of hot air, which permeates the national dialogue on telephony. You are the only one I have met in the last fourteen years...who understands the situation, articulates it, and does so without prejudice. Edward P. Larkin, Chairman, New York Public Service Commission, 1984

No other participant has done as much as your group to make the information age as successful as it is. Lloyd Schermer Chairman, American Newspaper Publisher’s Association, Chairman and CEO Lee Enterprises. 2012

In the course of its work on developing the JCS bill, the Investigations Subcommittee, which I chair, has benefited significantly from the studies authored by retired General J. H. Cushman. I understand that the Program on Information Resources Policy has sponsored General Cushman's work, and commend you for supporting a project that is having an immediate, constructive impact as the Congress frames the future structure of the defense establishment. Congressman Bill Nichols, 1985

The Program on Information Resources Policy, through its independent and incisive analyses, free from special interest and partisan considerations, has helped me and my predecessors cut through the noise and get to the bottom of important public policy issues in the communications and information field. Over the years, the Harvard Program has become an indispensable institution on which policymakers in both the public and private sector have come to depend for truthful and fearless advice, even if its views have run sometimes counter to popular or conventional wisdom. For a Congressman to deal with people who are in fact impartial and competent is a rare experience. I recognize this program and your work as being critical to the development of sound telecommunications policy, and I support your continued efforts to examine these important issues. Congressman Edward J. Markey, Subcommittee on Telecommunications and Finance, 1991

This chapter is the most succinct and analytical source yet available for elucidating local distribution policy, planning, and marketing. Journal of Communication 1985

(Longstaff's draft is) the best thing I ever read in the field. I need another copy. Senator McCain is reading it and won't let it go. John McCain/Mark Buse, Senator John McCain's office, 1995

Your work is a distinguished contribution not only to the world of research and to your university, but to all of us whose life is caught up in the business of communication. Robert D. Lilley, President, American Telephone and Telegraph Company, 1974

Last week's conference was the finest I have ever attended. John R. Bennett, President, Transamerica Information Services, 1977

We are appreciative of the constructive work that you have been doing, particularly in the postal arena, and we certainly hope that you will continue to contribute to clearer thinking about the Postal Service here in this country. Kent Rhodes, Chairman, Reader's Digest, 1978

Your center is a gold mine of information—and I very much appreciate your thoughtfulness in filling up my reading file with such helpful and insightful materials. "You could have used my name if you hadn't asked", Executive Office of the President, 1990

Your chart of information industries revenues will save us and our consultants many hundreds of hours of labor. I am especially grateful for your willingness to send a handwritten table prior to publication—we will guard it with our lives. Charles M. Oliver, Director, Legislative and Regulatory Policy, CBS, Inc., 1981

I want both of you to know that our luncheon session last month and your follow-on work paid big dividends for us. George H. Bolling, Vice President, Advanced Programs, COMSAT, 1990

There is no trace of the mindless pap which passes as "debate on regulation." Media Information Australia, 1985

Have now read the C3I paper. Absolutely fascinating, and very useful to me in preparing a speech I hope to make on the SDI program later this week. The quality of the discussion was quite exceptional, and kept me reading all weekend! Sir Ian Lloyd, M.P., House of Commons, U.K., Chairman: All parties Committee on Communications Technology, 1986

The Program is in our view the pre-eminent honest broker in the massive job of keeping track of what is happening to, and within, the industry that comprises the means of moving information from place to place. John Morgan, Assistant to Executive Vice President, Communications Workers of America, 1981

There is no question at all that Washington looks at your work as an outside expert of very high credibility. I see your testimony reflected in their decisions as well as hearing about you in their discussions. Your work and your role are excellent. William Ditch, American District Telegraph Corporation, 1981

David Charlton was very high in praise for you as the highest quality effort he has ever come in contact with. Frank Kapper, Corning, Inc., 1989

I am amazed at the religious fervor with which Apple is using your map. I was handed it as background reading for my meeting with Sculley, Chairman and Nagle, Chief Scientist. They said “this may take you a while”. John Schwartz, Newsweek (reporter), 1993
