= SNET =

SNET or Snet may refer to:

- Southern New England Telephone, a local phone company in Connecticut presently owned by Frontier Communications
- Southern New England Telecommunications, the former parent holding company of the above
  - SNET America, a long distance telephone subsidiary
  - SNET Information Services, former directory publisher
- StreetNet/s usually abbreviated as SNET, a wireless and wired decentralized community network providing an alternative intranet to traditional internet in Cuba to avoid Internet censorship.
- Société nationale d'électricité et de thermique, a French electric power company
- Snět, a village in the Czech Republic

== See also ==
- Sportsnet, a Canadian sports specialty channel
