= Ameritech Publishing =

YP Midwest Publishing LLC.
- Company type: Subsidiary
- Industry: Directory Publishing
- Founded: 1983; 43 years ago
- Headquarters: Tucker, Georgia, United States
- Products: YP Real Yellow Pages in Indiana, Michigan, Ohio, Wisconsin
- Parent: Ameritech (1983-1999); SBC/AT&T (1999-2012); YP Holdings (2012-present)

YP Midwest Publishing LLC., originally Ameritech Publishing, Inc., was formed in 1983 during the Bell System Divestiture. It combined the former directory operations of Illinois Bell, Indiana Bell, Michigan Bell, Ohio Bell and Wisconsin Telephone. Ameritech Publishing published telephone directories in Indiana, Ohio, Michigan, and Wisconsin. Directories in Illinois were made in a joint venture with R. H. Donnelley.

== History ==
Prior to brand standardization by SBC Communications, Ameritech directories were published under the PagesPlus brand. Ameritech Publishing's operations in Illinois and northwest Indiana were placed in a partnership with R. H. Donnelley, called DonTech, in 1999. Following brand standardization since 2002, Ameritech Publishing, the company, is currently known as Ameritech Publishing, Inc. d/b/a AT&T Advertising & Publishing.

== Spinoff ==
In 2012, Ameritech Publishing (along with the rest of AT&T Advertising Solutions) was spun off into YP Holdings. Ameritech Publishing was then renamed YP Midwest Publishing LLC.
