= Southwestern Bell Yellow Pages =

YP Texas Region Yellow Pages LLC
- Type: Subsidiary
- Industry: Directory Publishing
- Founded: 1984; 42 years ago
- Headquarters: Tucker, Georgia, United States
- Products: YP Real Yellow Pages in Arkansas, Kansas, Missouri, Oklahoma and Texas
- Parent: SBC/AT&T (1984-2012); YP Holdings (2012-present)
- Website: www.yp.com

Southwestern Bell Yellow Pages logo, 1984-1994

YP Texas Region Yellow Pages LLC is a division of YP Holdings that publishes telephone directories to Southwestern Bell customers for AT&T.

The company was originally formed in 1984 as Southwestern Bell Media, Inc. Its products included the Southwestern Bell Yellow Pages and the Silver Pages, a telephone directory specifically compiled with listings of businesses that were focused on senior citizens.

In 1991, Southwestern Bell Media relocated its corporate domicile to Missouri and became Southwestern Bell Yellow Pages, Inc. Southwestern Bell Yellow Pages also began marketing its yellow pages directory under the "SWBYP'S" name, shorthand for Southwestern Bell Yellow Pages. Telephone numbers to the company also were cleverly named; if customers sought to order more telephone books, they called 1-800-SWB-BOOK; for the advertising side, 1-800-4SWBYPS.

In 1995, Southwestern Bell Corporation changed its name to SBC Communications. The Southwestern Bell Yellow Pages division was reorganized, with Southwestern Bell Advertising, L.P. and Southwestern Bell Yellow Pages Resources, Inc. being formed. Southwestern Bell Advertising compiled directory listings, while Southwestern Bell Yellow Pages was a sales agent for directory advertising.

In 1997, SBC began acquiring other telephone companies, including Pacific Telesis, Ameritech, and SNET. It began including the "SBC" branding with the names of its operating companies. The SWBYP'S nickname went by the wayside, in favor of simply Southwestern Bell Yellow Pages. The last year SWBYP'S were branded Southwestern Bell came in 2001, when "SBC" was added to the company names SBC owned, and SWBYP'S became known as SBC Southwestern Bell Yellow Pages. The Southwestern Bell branding was retired altogether in 2002 in favor of SBC's corporate standard SBC SMART Yellow Pages, inherited from Pacific Bell Directory.

Until 2004, telephone directories published by Southwestern Bell Yellow Pages included the following disclaimer:

"Directory listings contained herein are transcribed by Southwestern Bell Advertising, L.P., from compilations copyright (year) by Southwestern Bell Telephone Company, and may not be reproduced in whole or part, or in any form whatsoever without the consent of Southwestern Bell Telephone Company."

== Spinoff ==
In 2012, the company was sold to YP Holdings, becoming YP Texas Region Yellow Pages LLC. The company was relocated to the state of Delaware as opposed to Missouri, the historic domicile of Southwestern Bell.

The "Texas Region" identifier with its corporate name refers to Southwestern Bell's headquarters in Dallas, Texas.
