= Ameritech Cellular =

American wireless services company; subsidiary of AT&T

Ameritech Mobile Communications, LLC
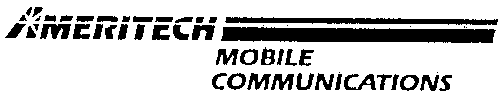
- Type: Holding of AT&T Mobility
- Industry: Wireless company
- Founded: 1984; 42 years ago
- Defunct: 2002; 24 years ago
- Fate: Acquired By SBC Communications (AT&T Inc.)
- Headquarters: Chicago, IL
- Products: AMPS
- Parent: Ameritech (1984-1999); SBC (1999-2000); AT&T Wireless, LLC (2000-present)
- Website: att.com/wireless

Ameritech Mobile Communications, LLC was the first telecommunications company in the U.S. to provide cellular mobile phone service to the general public. Cell service became publicly available in Chicago on October 13, 1983. The company was a division of Ameritech which, as of January 1, 1984, was the holding company of Illinois Bell, Michigan Bell, Wisconsin Bell, Ohio Bell, and Indiana Bell, which provide landline service to the Great Lakes region. From around 1986, Cincinnati Bell held a 45% stake in the company. Originally named Ameritech Mobile Communications, it later became known as Ameritech Cellular.

Following Ameritech's merger with SBC Corporation, Ameritech's wireless network was integrated with SBC's wireless network. Originally, Ameritech used CDMA as its network technology choice, but then converted to TDMA to be compatible with SBC's other wireless networks that were mostly using TDMA. During the SBC merger its original network in Chicago was sold to GTE (which later became part of Verizon Wireless).
