= SNET Information Services =

- Industry: Publishing
- Genre: Directories and phone books
- Parent: YP Holdings

YP Connecticut Information Services LLC, originally SNET Information Services, Inc., was the directory publishing arm of Southern New England Telecommunications. It is currently owned by YP Holdings and publishes telephone directories for Southern New England Telephone customers under the YP Real Yellow Pages name.

== History ==
When its parent, Southern New England Telecommunications, was acquired by SBC Communications in 1998, its operations remained largely independent of other SBC directory companies. In 2003, however, following brand standardization, the SNET Yellow Pages were rebranded the SBC Yellow Pages. In 2005, following SBC's acquisition of AT&T, the SNET directories were rebranded as the AT&T Yellow Pages.

In 2006, following BellSouth's purchase by AT&T, the directory company itself was rebranded as AT&T Advertising & Publishing, the collective name of all of AT&T's directory operations.

In 2012, the company's operations were reincorporated in Delaware as YP Connecticut Information Services LLC. The company was sold to YP Holdings.

In 2014, AT&T sold off Southern New England Telephone to Frontier Communications. However, YP continues to publish its Connecticut directories with the AT&T name and logo as official directories for SNET customers are published by Local Insight Yellow Pages, publisher of FrontierPages.
