= Yellowpages.com =

American online business search site

YP LLC
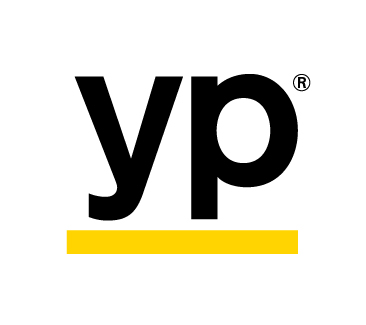
- Company type: Subsidiary
- Industry: Online advertising
- Founded: May 8, 2012; 14 years ago
- Headquarters: Tucker, Georgia, U.S.
- Products: Digital Advertising; Print Directories; Web Design; Listing Management; Video Creation; Local Search Ads; SEO; SEM; Direct Marketing; Display Marketing
- Parent: YP Holdings
- Website: yellowpages.com

Yellowpages.com is a United States–based web site operated by Thryv that provides listings for local businesses. In 2013, it was re-branded as YP.com or simply "YP". It currently offers a broad range of marketing tools including online presence, local search, display ads and direct marketing. It was previously a wholly owned subsidiary of AT&T.

YP's consumer brands include the YP mobile app and yp.com, which are used by nearly 80 million consumers each month in the U.S. and The Real Yellow Pages directory. In May 2016, YP entered into a partnership with the Better Business Bureau, displaying ratings for listings of businesses that have earned an A or A+ rating or BBB accreditation.

== History ==
Yellowpages.com was founded in 1996 during the dotcom boom, by multiple cofounders, including CEO Dane Madsen. Yellowpages.com became part of Globalgate, an ecommerce incubator and investment company in 1998, which sold the business to its largest investors in 2001.

In late 2004, BellSouth Corp and SBC Communications Inc. (both of which published phone directories using variants of the Yellow Pages name) purchased www.YellowPages.com Inc. reportedly for US$100 Million. The companies formed a joint venture to run the business. The two companies had already been partners for the wireless phone service Cingular. Each company had its own online Yellow Pages: BellSouth owned RealPages.com and SBC owned SmartPages.com. The two sites effectively merged into the newly acquired YellowPages.com.

In 2009, the YELLOWPAGES.com site was rebranded as YP.com.

In September 2018, 13 million users visited Yellowpages.com.

== Acquisitions ==
In 2005, SBC acquired AT&T and took on the stronger AT&T brand. One year later, AT&T acquired Bellsouth for US$67 Billion. At this point, the YELLOWPAGES.com business was no longer a joint venture, instead, it became a wholly owned subsidiary of AT&T, also doing business as AT&T Interactive.

On May 8, 2012, Cerberus Capital Management acquired a majority share of YELLOWPAGES.com LLC, as well as the print Yellow Pages business from AT&T. The business is now operating under YP LLC. YP has expanded its offers to include digital marketing.

In July 2017, YP Holdings was acquired by Dex Media, which rebranded as Thryv Inc. in 2019.

== Recognition ==
On July 31, 2012, YP was included in PaidContent50's list of "the world's most successful digital media companies" based on 2011 digital ad revenue.
