= ICB =

The abbreviation ICB may denote:

== In finance ==
- Independent Commission on Banking (2010–2011), a United Kingdom government enquiry
- Industrial and Commercial Bank of Vietnam
- Industry Classification Benchmark, used internationally to segregate markets into sectors within the macroeconomy
- Institute of Certified Bookkeepers, a United Kingdom-based non-profit
- International Commercial Bank, headquartered in Switzerland
- Investment Corporation of Bangladesh
- Iraqi Central Bank

== In technology ==
- Institute for Collaborative Biotechnologies, a US military research center
- InterConsult Bulgaria, a software development and business consulting corporation
- Internet Citizen's Band, an early Internet chat program and protocol
- Immune checkpoint blockade
- Information Control Block, in file systems

== In music ==
- Ice City Boyz, rap collective from London
- a song by New Order from the album Movement

== In other areas ==
- Industrial Cape Breton, a geographic region of Canada
- Infantry Combat Badge, an Australian military award
- Inner City Bypass, Brisbane
- Integrated care board, part of the integrated care system in the National Health Service of England
- Integrative and Comparative Biology, a journal
- International Children's Bible
- International Conference on Bisexuality (1991–2010), a gathering of academics and activists
- International Crisis Behavior Project, a study of international crises and wars
- Intracranial bleeding
- Islamabad College for Boys
- Islamic College of Brisbane, an Islamic school in Brisbane, Queensland, Australia
