= BAPCo =

Bapco, BAPCo or BAPCO may refer to:

- Bahrain Petroleum Company
- BellSouth Advertising & Publishing Corporation
