= Woodbury Telephone =

The Woodbury Telephone Company
- Industry: Telecommunications
- Founded: 1876
- Defunct: 2007
- Fate: Dissolved
- Successor: Southern New England Telephone
- Headquarters: Woodbury, Connecticut, United States
- Products: Local Telephone Service
- Parent: SNET (1997-2007)

The Woodbury Telephone Company was an American telephone company that served the Connecticut towns of Woodbury, Southbury, Bethlehem, and parts of Roxbury and Oxford. In 1997, Woodbury Telephone was acquired by Southern New England Telecommunications. In 1998, SNET merged with SBC Communications and Woodbury Telephone, the 75th largest independent telephone carrier in the United States, continued as a separate operating company under Southern New England Telephone.

On June 1, 2007, the company was dissolved and merged all assets and operations into Southern New England Telephone.

== History ==
Woodbury Telephone began operation in the 1870s when a local businessman, Mr. Charles A. Stone visited the Philadelphia Centennial Exposition 1876 and realized the value of connecting his grain and feed store to the Southbury Railroad Station via the telephone. The company grew modestly and was incorporated in 1910 with Arthur D. Warner as its first President. The company continued in operation and upgraded from a manual switchboard to a direct dial system in 1955. As the service area grew considerably in the 1970s and 1980s the company deployed digital switching, fiber optic network architecture and in the 1990s it successfully introduced internet service with broadband access.

At the time of its acquisition by SNET, the company had 19,000 lines.

=== Other historical notes ===
- Woodbury Telephone was the only local telephone operating company SBC/AT&T owned that had no roots in the original AT&T or Alexander Graham Bell.
- There were five other independent telephone companies that served parts of Connecticut and were bought by SNET: Lebanon (1912), East Haven (1925), Collinsville (1939), Sharon (1943) and Huntington (1948).
