= LCB =

LCB may refer to:

- Laksamana College of Business, a college in Brunei
- Lecuona Cuban Boys, a Cuban orchestra
- Leonid Chernovetskyi Bloc, a political alliance in Kyiv, Ukraine
- Lundquist College of Business, the University of Oregon's business school
- Lebanese Canadian Bank, a commercial bank in Lebanon
- Liga Portuguesa de Basquetebol, a sports league in Portugal
- Light Commando Battalions of the Pakistan Army
- London Children's Ballet, a children's charity in London
- London Commuter Belt, an alternative name for London's metropolitan area.
- Lactophenol Cotton Blue, used as a stain in the examination of fungi.
- Linear Current Booster, used to match photovoltaic output to motor input
- Le Cordon Bleu, a culinary school.
- LC Brühl, Swiss handball club

== See also ==
- ICB (disambiguation)
