= CenturyTel of the Midwest-Kendall =

CenturyTel of the Midwest-Kendall, LLC
- Type: Subsidiary
- Industry: Telecommunications
- Founded: 1989
- Parent: Brightspeed products = Local Telephone Service
- Website: http://www.brightspeed.com/

CenturyTel of the Midwest-Kendall, LLC is one of the Brightspeed operating companies in Wisconsin. The company's cities include Peshtigo, Kendall, and Marinette. It was formerly owned by Lumen Technologies.

== History ==
The company was operated as Novy Telephone Company from 1934 through 1988, then in 1989 was sold to an employee who operated as Kendall Telephone, Inc.. The company became CenturyTel of the Midwest - Kendall, Inc. in 1998. In 2001, the original company's assets were merged into a new company named CenturyTel of the Midwest-Kendall, LLC, which is simply a reincorporation of the original company in Delaware.

In 1998, CenturyTel acquired 89,000 telephone lines from Ameritech, which operated the lines through its Wisconsin Bell subsidiary. The lines were transferred to CenturyTel of the Midwest-Kendall.

=== Sale ===
On August 3, 2021, Lumen announced its sale of its local telephone assets in 20 states to Apollo Global Management, including Wisconsin. The sale closed on October 3, 2022, with Apollo subsidiary Brightspeed taking over.
