= Anthony Oettinger =

Computer scientist and information policy expert

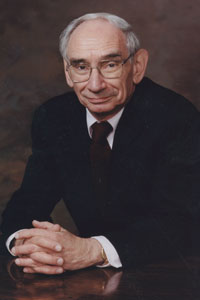
- Born: March 29, 1929; Nuremberg, Germany
- Died: July 26, 2022 (aged 93); Newton, Massachusetts
- Education: Harvard University
- Occupation: Retired
- Years active: 1954–2011
- Spouse(s): Married Marilyn Tanner, 1954
- Children: Two

Anthony "Tony" Gervin Oettinger (March 29, 1929 – July 26, 2022) was a German-born American linguist and computer scientist best known for his work on information resources policy. Oettinger coined the term “compunications” in the late 1970s to describe the combination of computer and telecommunications technologies that would take place as digital technologies replaced analog forms. In 1973 he co-founded, with John LeGates, the Program on Information Resources Policy at Harvard University. He served as a consultant to the President’s Foreign Intelligence Advisory Board and the National Security Council and NASA’s Apollo moon-landing program. From 1966 to 1968 he was president of the Association for Computing Machinery (ACM). He was recognized for his work in the intelligence community with the naming of the Anthony G. Oettinger School of Science and Technology Intelligence of the National Intelligence University. He was Gordon McKay Professor of Applied Mathematics and Professor of Information Resources Policy at Harvard.

== Early life ==
Oettinger was born in 1929 in Nuremberg, Germany to a French mother and German father. Nuremberg was where Hitler first established his political base and was the home of the Nazi party. Oettinger has said that “this probably saved my life, because my parents had the wit to notice what was going on.” In 1933, when he was four years old, his parents left to live with his grandparents in France. Getting caught up in the German march into France, his family arrived in New York in 1941 via Spain and Portugal. At the age of 12, English thus became his third language.

Oettinger graduated first in his class from the Bronx High School of Science and entered Harvard, because MIT, which was his first choice, did not offer him a scholarship and Harvard did. He received his A.B. summa cum laude in 1951, having studied Spanish and French literature, Russian, economics and mathematics. He was elected to Phi Beta Kappa as well as the chapter's First Marshall his junior year. Also as a junior he started working with Howard Aiken in the Computation Laboratory and acquired an interest in machine translation. After graduation, he spent a year at Cambridge University on a prestigious Henry Fellowship. By 1954 he had completed his Ph.D. in Applied Mathematics at Harvard, with a dissertation on "A study for the design of an automatic dictionary". He joined the Harvard faculty two years later first as an instructor (1955–1957), then an assistant professor (1957–1960), associate professor (1960–1963), and then as a full professor in linguistics (1964–1975) and in applied mathematics (1964– ). When he became a tenured professor in 1960 at the age of 31 he was the youngest to have achieved that status at Harvard in the modern era.

== Professional work ==
Oettinger's early work was primarily on machine translation. He capsulized the challenges of machine translation with an example of syntactic ambiguity "Time flies like an arrow; fruit flies like a banana". Oettinger is a pioneer in the early development of computer code and artificial intelligence (AI) and wrote the first AI programs to incorporate learning. In 1951 he developed the "response learning programme" and "shopping programme" for the University of Cambridge’s EDSAC computer. Considerably influenced by Alan Turing’s views on machine learning, Oettinger believed that the shopping program, which simulated the behavior of a small child sent to the store, could pass a version of the Turing test.

In 1973 he co-founded the Program on Information Resources Policy (PIRP) at Harvard to work primarily on policy issues arising from the confluence of telecommunications and digital computing. He served as its chairman until it ceased operations in 2011. Its mission was to create useful knowledge, both competent and impartial, on controversial information industry issues. One of the Program's overarching themes was that of convergence of computing and communications, which he dubbed "compunications," a term he claims was actually coined by his wife.

== Boards and government service ==
Oettinger has served in multiple capacities for the federal and state government. In 1972 he was appointed to the newly formed Massachusetts Cable Television Commission by Republican Governor Francis Sargent and from 1975-1979 served as its chairman under Democratic Governor Michael Dukakis.

He served on the Research Advisory Board of the Committee for Economic Development (1975-1979)

He was appointed by the White House as a consultant to the National Security Council from 1975 to 1981. From 1981 until 1990 he was a consultant to the President’s Foreign Intelligence Advisory Board. Other government appointments include the Scientific Advisory Group of the Defense Communications Agency, now the Defense Information Systems Agency (1979-1990) and on the Command, Control Communications and Intelligence Panel of the Naval Research Advisory Committee (1993-1995). From 1963 to 1967 he was an adviser to NASA’s Apollo Moon landing program.

Oettinger founded the Computer Science and Engineering Board of the National Academy of Sciences and chaired it for six years starting in 1967. From 1966 to 1968 he was president of the Association for Computing Machinery (ACM). From 1994 until 2010 Oettinger was chairman of the Board of Visitors of the U.S. National Defense Intelligence College, having first joined that Board in 1986.

== Honors ==
Oettinger was elected as a Fellow of the American Academy of Arts and Sciences. He was also named a Fellow of the Institute of Electrical and Electronics Engineers (IEEE) “for pioneering contributions to machine language translation, to information retrieval, and to the use of computers in education.” He was named a Fellow of the Association for Computing Machinery for leadership "in the establishment of the national communications and information resources policy."

He was presented with a commendation from President Gerald Ford for his service as a consultant to the National Security Council.

The Anthony G. Oettinger Science and Technology Intelligence School of the National Intelligence University was named in his honor upon his retirement from that Board.

== Bibliography ==
- Bibliography at the Program on Information Resources Policy, Harvard University
- ACM oral history interview (2006)
