= AT&T Building (Kingman, Arizona) =

- U.S. National Register of Historic Places
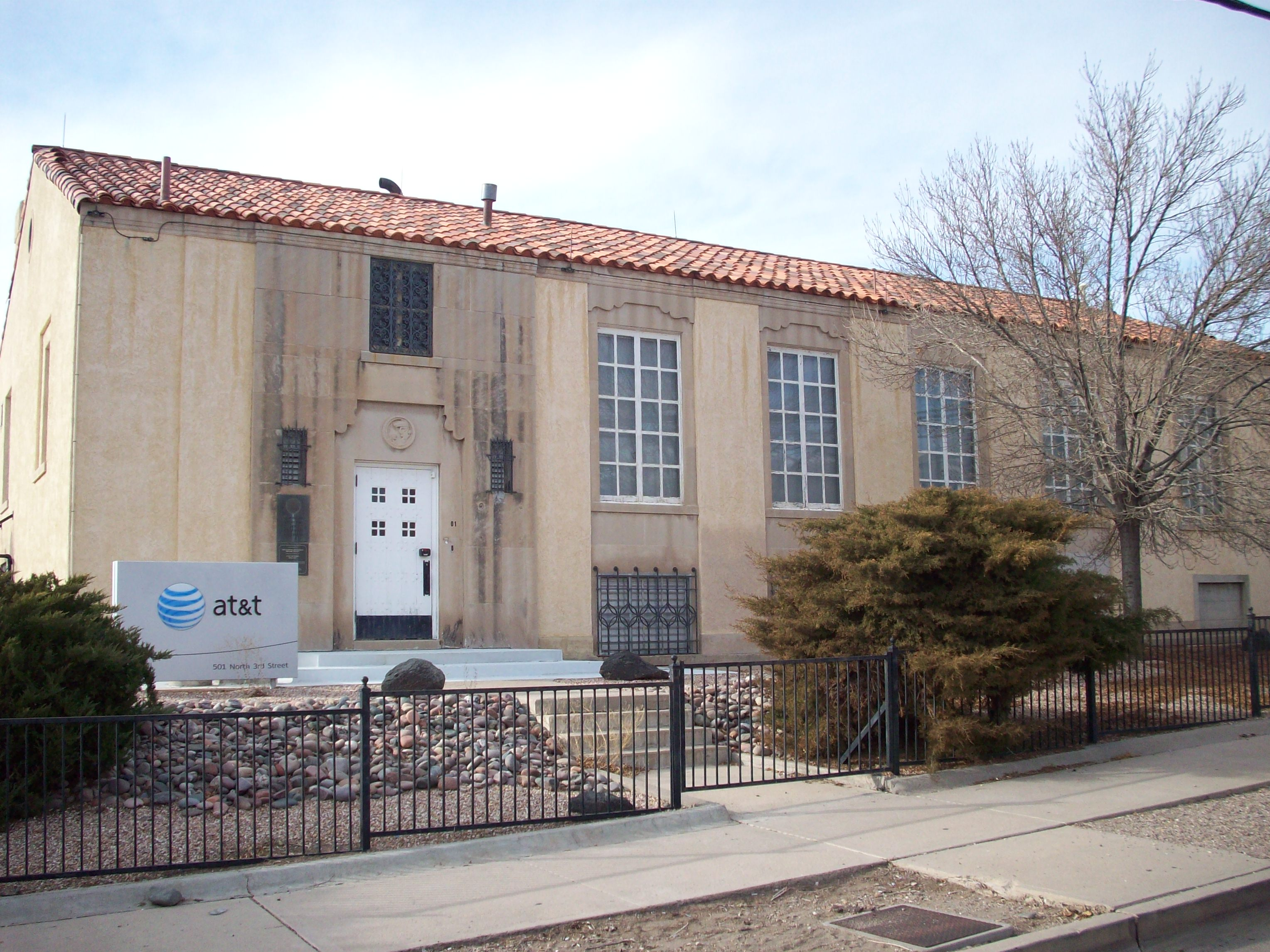

- Location within Arizona
- Location: Kingman, Arizona
- Coordinates: 35°11′33″N 114°3′13″W
- Built: 1930
- Architect: Fisher & Fisher
- Architectural style: Spanish Colonial Revival
- MPS: Kingman MRA
- NRHP reference No.: 86001114
- Added to NRHP: May 14, 1986

The AT&T Building is a historic building located at the corner of Pine and Third Streets in Kingman, Arizona. The building was built in 1930 by contractors Mead & Mount. Architects Fisher & Fisher designed the building in the Spanish Colonial Revival style. Built in a residential area, the building is still used by AT&T. The building was placed on the National Register of Historic Places in 1986.

It was evaluated for National Register listing as part of a 1985 study of 63 historic resources in Kingman that led to this and many others being listed.
