= SNET America =

SNET America, Inc.
- Trade name: Frontier Long Distance
- Type: Holding of Frontier
- Industry: Telecommunications
- Founded: 1993
- Headquarters: United States
- Parent: SNET (1993-1998); SBC/AT&T (1998-2014); Frontier (2014-2026); Verizon (2026-present)
- Website: www.frontier.com

SNET America, Inc. is a long-distance telephone company owned by Frontier Communications that serves Connecticut with customers in other states. SNET America was formed by Southern New England Telecommunications Corp. in 1993 to compete with other long-distance carriers within Connecticut. SNET America does business as Frontier Communications. It is distinct from Frontier Communications Online and Long Distance and Citizens Communications of America, the other core long-distance units of Frontier.

SNET America came under the ownership of SBC Communications in 1998. In 2003, SNET America began doing business as SBC Long Distance East. In 2005, when SBC changed its name to AT&T, SNET America began doing business as AT&T Long Distance East.

On December 17, 2013, AT&T announced plans to sell SNET America and its companion incumbent local exchange carrier Southern New England Telephone to Frontier Communications for $2 billion.

The sale to Frontier closed on October 25, 2014. SNET America then began doing business as Frontier Long Distance.
