= Wisconsin Bell =

Telephone company

Wisconsin Bell, LLC
- Logo used since 2016, reflecting AT&T's unified branding
- Formerly: Wisconsin Telephone Company; Wisconsin Bell, Inc.
- Company type: Subsidiary
- Industry: Telecommunications
- Founded: 1882; 144 years ago
- Headquarters: Milwaukee, WI, United States
- Area served: Wisconsin
- Key people: Scott VanderSanden, President
- Products: POTS; DSL; U-Verse (FTTN)
- Number of employees: 5,000 (2006)
- Parent: AT&T Corporation (1899–1983); Ameritech (1984–1999); AT&T Inc. (1999-present)
- Website: www.att.com

Wisconsin Bell, LLC, doing business as AT&T Wisconsin, is the incumbent local exchange carrier serving Wisconsin. A former unit of the historic Bell System, it primarily provides traditional landline phone services in the region It is currently owned by AT&T Inc. through AT&T Wireline Holdings, LLC.

== History ==
Wisconsin Bell was founded in 1882 under the name Wisconsin Telephone Company by Charles Haskins as a successor to his earlier Milwaukee Telephone Exchange Co., the first telephone exchange in Milwaukee.

Logo used from 1921–1939

Wisconsin Telephone, like most local telephone companies at this time, received a license from the Bell Telephone Company for core patents and technologies as well as access to Bell's long distance services. It therefore was from the beginning a member of the Bell System and dependent on Bell, but remained legally independent until 1899 when Bell's assets and licensees were consolidated under the American Telephone and Telegraph Company (AT&T).

Logo used from 1984-1993

After the 1984 Breakup of the Bell System, Wisconsin Telephone became a part of Ameritech, one of the seven Regional Bell Operating Companies. At this time the company changed its name to Wisconsin Bell, Inc., having used this name for many years prior as a Bell System unit.

In 1985, Wisconsin Bell began to purchase digital switching equipment from Siemens for its 1.6 million customers. In 1989, the change had been completed, and it became the first Ameritech company to use solely electronic switching equipment.

The Wisconsin Bell name continued to be used publicly until September 1993 when Ameritech dropped all of their individual Bell Operating Company names in favor of using their corporate name for marketing purposes. Wisconsin Bell started doing business as Ameritech Wisconsin.

In 1998, Ameritech sold 19 Wisconsin Bell exchanges, primarily located in central and northern Wisconsin, to CenturyTel (now Lumen Technologies). Those exchanges were transferred to the subsidiary CenturyTel of the Midwest-Kendall.

In 2001, following Ameritech's acquisition by SBC Corporation, Wisconsin Bell began doing business as SBC Ameritech Wisconsin, which was shortened in 2002 to SBC Wisconsin. In 2005, it adopted the trade name AT&T Wisconsin after SBC acquired the original AT&T Corporation and took the AT&T name.

In 2024, Wisconsin Bell was placed under the ownership of AT&T Wireline Holdings, LLC rather than AT&T Inc. directly. The company was subsequently reorganised as a limited liability company under the legal name Wisconsin Bell, LLC. However, its trade name remains AT&T Wisconsin.

== AT&T Center ==
The AT&T Center is a 19-story, 213 foot tall neo-gothic building in downtown Milwaukee, Wisconsin. Construction began in 1918 for Wisconsin Telephone Company and was completed in 1924. It currently houses the AT&T Wisconsin headquarters.

== See also ==
- AT&T
- Ameritech
- Ameritech Cellular
- Bell System
- CenturyTel of the Midwest-Kendall
