= Beth E. Mooney =

American banking executive

- Born: Beth Elaine Streeter; 1955 (age 70–71); Midland, Michigan, U.S.
- Education: University of Texas at Austin, Southern Methodist University
- Employer: KeyCorp
- Known for: Becoming the first woman leader of a top 20 U.S. bank as the CEO of KeyCorp
- Board member of: AT&T, Ford Motor Company

Beth Elaine Mooney (born 1955) is an American financial executive who is the first woman to be CEO of a top-20 U.S. bank. From November 2010 until May 1, 2011, she was the president and the chief operating officer at KeyCorp. On May 1, 2011, KeyCorp named Mooney its chairwoman and chief executive officer of the Cleveland, Ohio-based bank. She retired in 2020.

== Early life and education ==
Mooney was born in 1955 as Beth Elaine Streeter. She was raised in Midland, Michigan, where her father was a chemist for Dow Chemical, and her mother was an English teacher. She was the youngest of three children in the family.

Mooney earned a BA in history from the University of Texas at Austin. She earned an MBA from Southern Methodist University in 1983.

In 1977, she got a job in the real estate department of First City National Bank of Houston. She worked there as a bank secretary until 1979, when she got a job on Republic Bank of Dallas' management training program, after refusing to leave training manager Keith Schmidt's office until he employed her.

== Career ==
In 16 years, Mooney performed in various roles in the banking industry, such as commercial and real estate lending and chief financial officer. Mooney served as regional president of Bank One in Akron and Dayton.

From June 1999 until June 2000, she served as president of Bank One Ohio, NA.

She was chief operating officer of DPL Inc, a public utility, from June 1998 until June 1999.

From June 2000 until February 2004, Mooney served as group head of Tennessee and North Louisiana Banking Group.

In 2004, she left Nashville to become the CFO of AmSouth.

From February 2004 until April 4, 2006, she was the CFO and head of the finance group of Regions Financial Corporation in Birmingham, Alabama, (which was formerly known as AmSouth Bancorp and AmSouth Bancorporation) and its subsidiary AmSouth bank.

=== KeyCorp ===
In April 2006, Mooney joined KeyCorp as a vice chair and head of Key Community Bank.

In November 2010, she became president and chief operation officer at KeyCorp.

On May 1, 2011, Mooney became CEO and chairwoman of KeyCorp. She was the first woman leader of a top 20 U.S. bank.

In September 2019, Mooney announced her retirement from KeyCorp, effective May 2020.

In March 2019, Mooney was named the chair-elect of Cleveland Clinic's board of directors.

== See also ==
- List of chief executive officers
