= Pacific Bell Directory =

YP Western Directory LLC
- Type: Subsidiary
- Industry: Telecommunications
- Founded: 1984; 42 years ago
- Headquarters: Tucker, Georgia, United States
- Parent: Pacific Telesis (1984-1997); SBC/AT&T (1997-2012); YP Holdings (2012-present)

YP Western Directory LLC, formerly Pacific Bell Directory, was the advertising and publishing division of the Pacific Telesis Group. PBD Holdings held Pacific Bell Directory under its umbrella, who published directories in both Nevada and California.

== History ==
Pacific Bell Directory was founded in 1984 to take over directory operations formerly provided by Pacific Bell and Nevada Bell themselves. PBD published its telephone directories under the SMART Yellow Pages name. Upon brand integration of its Bell Operating Companies by SBC Communications, it retained the SMART Yellow Pages name for a time following this period. After 2004, however, it ceased using the SMART name.

Pacific Bell Directory's listings compilation division was merged with Southwestern Bell Advertising, L.P., forming SBC Advertising, L.P. It was renamed in 2006 to the current AT&T Advertising, L.P. Pacific Bell Directory still exists today to serve as the directory publisher of the AT&T Real Yellow Pages for Pacific Bell and Nevada Bell customers.

In 2012, Pacific Bell Directory was spun off as part of the AT&T-Cerberus joint venture YP Holdings. It was reincorporated in Delaware as YP Western Directory LLC.
