= Internet Citizen's Band =

Internet Citizen's Band (better known as ICB) is an early Internet chat program and its associated protocol. It was released in 1989.

ICB is typically served on port 7326.

== History ==
The first version of ICB was a program called "Forumnet" or "fn", written by University of Kentucky IT staffer Sean Carrick Casey. It was widely used at the University of Kentucky, Georgia Tech, UC Davis, MIT, University of New Mexico, Stanford University, Mills College, UC Santa Cruz, and UC Berkeley. Fn, based on a MUD software program by Casey, established the protocol and clients.

Fn was used as a realtime communications channel after the 1989 Loma Prieta earthquake - Internet access from hard-hit Santa Cruz returned to service before reliable phone service did. In March 1991 the University of Kentucky changed policy and shut down the fn server. Within 2 months a new server had been created from the client software by another fn user, John Atwood Devries. It was put online, now renamed ICB. This new server code, unrelated to the original server except by the common client software source, was then used as the basis of many ICB servers to follow. From 1995 to 2000, the server code was heavily rewritten by Jon Luini and Michel Hoche-Mong, to improve stability and add features. It remains available at the ICB.net web site.

ICB is still in operation with a dedicated user base. A variety of clients exist for all major operating systems.

== Features ==
ICB features many standard chat program functions, including channels, private messages, and nickname registration. Most of the common clients support TCL scripting of commands and functions. Some clients (principally icbm) support scripting in Perl instead.

== Limitations ==
ICB has never supported multi-server shared groups, so the number of simultaneous users has always been somewhat limited in comparison to more popular chat programs.

ICB does not support transferring files or multimedia via the chat program. However, the very restrictive protocol has a very small remote attack surface.

The ICB protocol is not 8-bit clean.
