= Upoc Networks =

Upoc Networks was a New York–based mobile phone services provider and carrier aggregator. Upoc was founded in 1999 and has developed mobile community solutions for carriers, consumers, media companies and marketers to communicate via SMS (text messaging), WAP (wireless Internet), voice, MMS (multimedia messaging), BREW, Java, and other technologies.

Upoc was sold in 2006 to Dada USA, at a reported loss of approximately $19 million. Dada USA then was renamed Dada Entertainment and today is a Subsidiary of Buongiorno, an International mobile content Company

Upoc announced it was discontinuing service on October 25, 2011, in a short website statement and a posting on its official Twitter page.

November 30, 2011, was the last day of service, as of December 1, 2011, the Upoc service has been shut down.
