= New England Telephone =

New England Telephone may refer to the following companies:

- Verizon New England, originally named New England Telephone and Telegraph Company but commonly known as New England Telephone, an ILEC that originally covered all of New England except Connecticut but now covers only Massachusetts and Rhode Island
- Consolidated Communications of Northern New England, a company founded in 2007 that operates former New England Telephone lines in Maine and New Hampshire
  - Consolidated Communications of Vermont, a company created in 2008 that operates former New England Telephone lines in Vermont, a subsidiary of the above
- New England Telephone and Telegraph Company, which operated from 1878 to 1879, and which is unrelated to the later firm of the same name.
