= Thomas A. Sanders =

American politician, lawyer, banker, and real estate developer

Thomas A. Sanders (1889-August 4, 1946) was an American politician, lawyer, banker, and real estate developer from Maine. Sanders, a Republican, served one term in the Maine House of Representatives (1923–24). He spent most of his professional career working in real estate. He founded the Federal Loan & Savings Bank in 1915, which was at one time the largest savings and loan association in Maine. His company built two large suburban developments in Portland (Oakwood Heights and Bedford Park).

== Politics ==
Sanders was active in local and state politics. He served on the Portland City Council for three years as well as on the Board of Aldermen prior to its dissolution. In 1935, he and another real estate developer created maps for the Home Owners' Loan Corporation which identified neighborhoods in Portland and South Portland which had primarily Irish, Jewish, Italian, or Polish residents. These maps were involved in the process known as redlining.

He was a member of the Freemasons from 1918 until his death in 1946.
