= Michigan Bell =

American telecommunications company

Michigan Bell Telephone Company

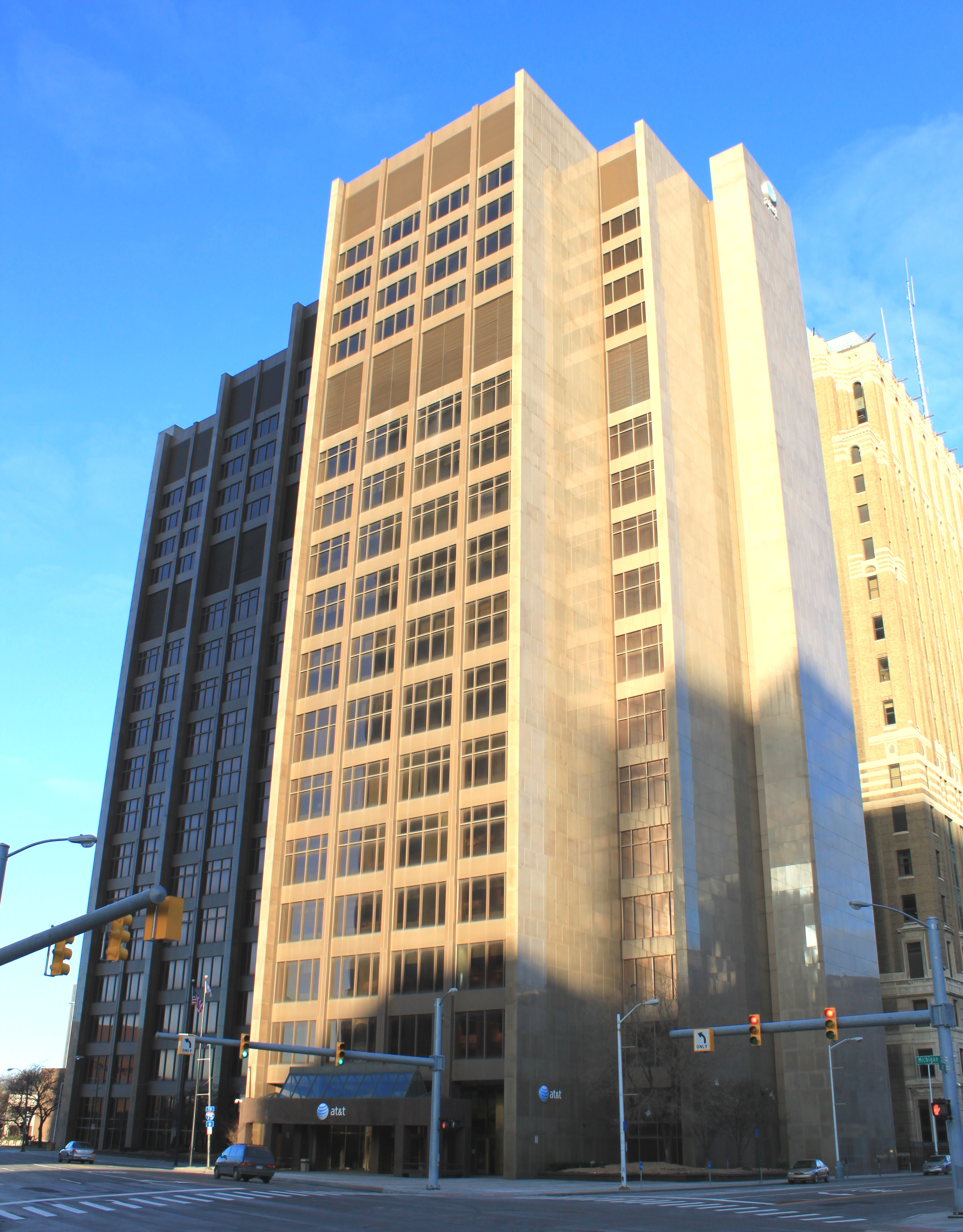
- AT&T Michigan Headquarters Building, Detroit
- Type: Subsidiary
- Industry: Telecommunications
- Founded: 1904; 122 years ago
- Headquarters: AT&T Michigan Headquarters; Detroit, MI, United States
- Products: Local telephone service
- Number of employees: 8,900
- Website: http://www.att.com

Michigan Bell is the subsidiary of AT&T serving the state of Michigan. Following the Bell System divestiture on January 8, 1984, the company became a subsidiary of Ameritech, the Regional Bell operating company that served the midwestern United States. Ameritech was subsequently acquired by SBC Communications, which later changed its name to AT&T.

== History ==
Telephone service in Michigan was initially developed through a number of local companies operating under licenses from the Bell Telephone Company. In 1881, the Michigan Bell Telephone Company was formed to coordinate and interconnect Bell-licensed exchanges across the state; it subsequently merged with the Detroit-based Telephone and Telegraph Construction Company to form the Michigan Telephone Company in 1883.

Following financial difficulties and foreclosure proceedings involving the Michigan Telephone Company, the Michigan State Telephone Company was organized in 1904 as its successor; a contemporary report published in February of that year described the new company explicitly as "the successor of the Michigan Telephone company" and detailed the transfer of the former company's assets and securities to the new concern. The Michigan State Telephone Company changed its name to the Michigan Bell Telephone Company in 1924; the company operated under licensing arrangements with AT&T and became one of the Bell System's regional operating companies.

Following the breakup of the Bell System in 1984, Michigan Bell became a subsidiary of Ameritech, the regional holding company created for the Bell operating companies in Michigan, Illinois, Indiana, Ohio and Wisconsin. SBC Communications acquired Ameritech in 1999; SBC subsequently acquired the former AT&T Corporation in 2005 and adopted the AT&T name. Michigan Bell continues to exist as the legal operating company in Michigan and does business as AT&T Michigan; the Michigan Public Service Commission identifies AT&T Michigan as formerly known as SBC Michigan and Ameritech Michigan.

=== Sale of Upper Peninsula lines ===
On March 28, 2025, AT&T announced the sale of its wireline assets in Michigan’s Upper Peninsula to UP Fiber, Inc. Following the close of the sale, Michigan Broadband Services will provide sales, marketing, billing, and technical support to the former Michigan Bell customers.

The sale of Michigan Bell lines to UP Fiber was approved by the FCC on February 23, 2026. On March 2, 2026, UP Fiber informed the FCC that it planned to take control of the 40 wire centers it is acquiring from Michigan Bell on or before March 31, 2026.
