= Snět =

- Municipality
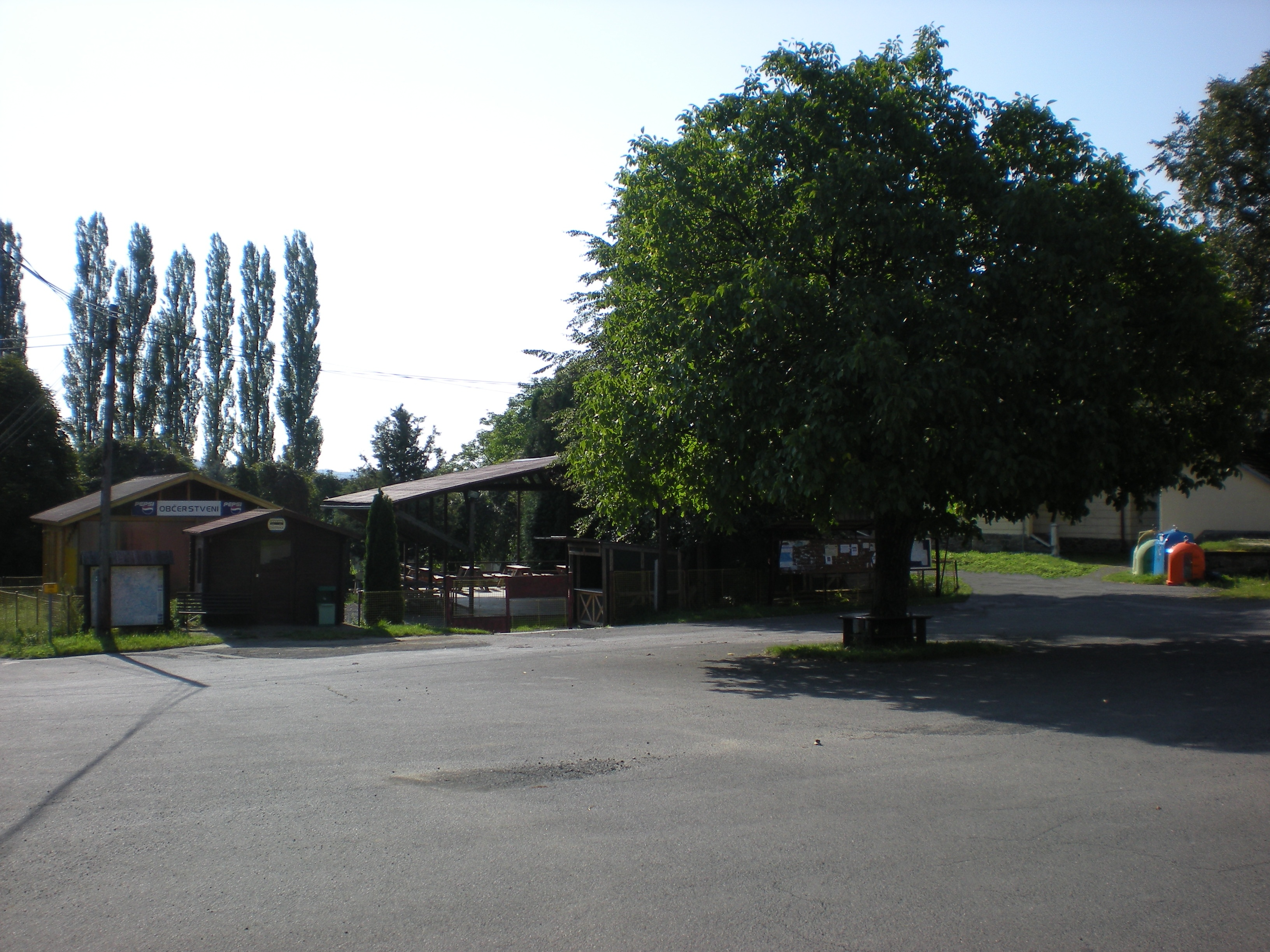
- Centre of Snět

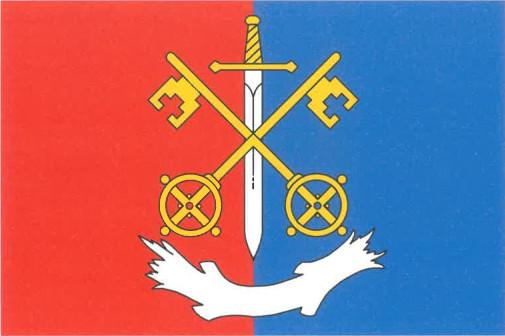
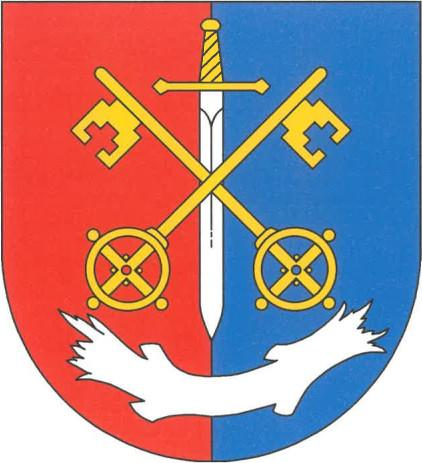
- Flag Coat of arms

- Location in the Czech Republic
- Coordinates: 49°37′35″N 15°13′37″E
- Country: Czech Republic
- Region: Central Bohemian
- District: Benešov
- First mentioned: 1352

Area
  - Total: 6.03 km^{2} (2.33 sq mi)
- Elevation: 464 m (1,522 ft)

Population (2026-01-01)
  - Total: 91
  - Density: 15/km^{2} (39/sq mi)
- Time zone: UTC+1 (CET)
  - Summer (DST): UTC+2 (CEST)
- Postal code: 257 68
- Website: obecsnet.cz

Snět is a municipality and village in Benešov District in the Central Bohemian Region of the Czech Republic. It has about 90 inhabitants.

== Geography ==
Snět is located about 42 kilometres (26 mi) southeast of Benešov and 36 km (22 mi) northwest of Jihlava. It lies in the Křemešník Highlands. The highest point is at 535 m (1,755 ft) above sea level. The municipality is located on the shore of the Švihov Reservoir, built on the Želivka River.

== Demographics ==
Historical population
Year	Pop.	±%
1869	312	—
1880	365	+17.0%
1890	396	+8.5%
1900	410	+3.5%
1910	406	−1.0%
1921	356	−12.3%
1930	320	−10.1%
1950	253	−20.9%
1961	271	+7.1%
1970	219	−19.2%
1980	158	−27.9%
1991	135	−14.6%
2001	109	−19.3%
2011	98	−10.1%
2021	101	+3.1%
Source: Censuses
