= YP Holdings =

American directory company

- Company type: Subsidiary
- Industry: Online Advertising
- Predecessor: AT&T
- Founded: April 4, 2012; 14 years ago
- Headquarters: Tucker, Georgia, U.S.
- Key people: Jared Rowe (CEO)
- Products: Digital Advertising; Print Directories; Web Design; Listing Management; Video Creation; Local Search Ads; SEO; SEM; Direct Marketing; Display Marketing
- Parent: Thryv
- Subsidiaries: Yellowpages.com; YP Connecticut Information Services; YP Midwest Publishing; YP Southeast Advertising & Publishing; YP Texas Region Yellow Pages; YP Western Directory
- Website: http://yellowpages.com/

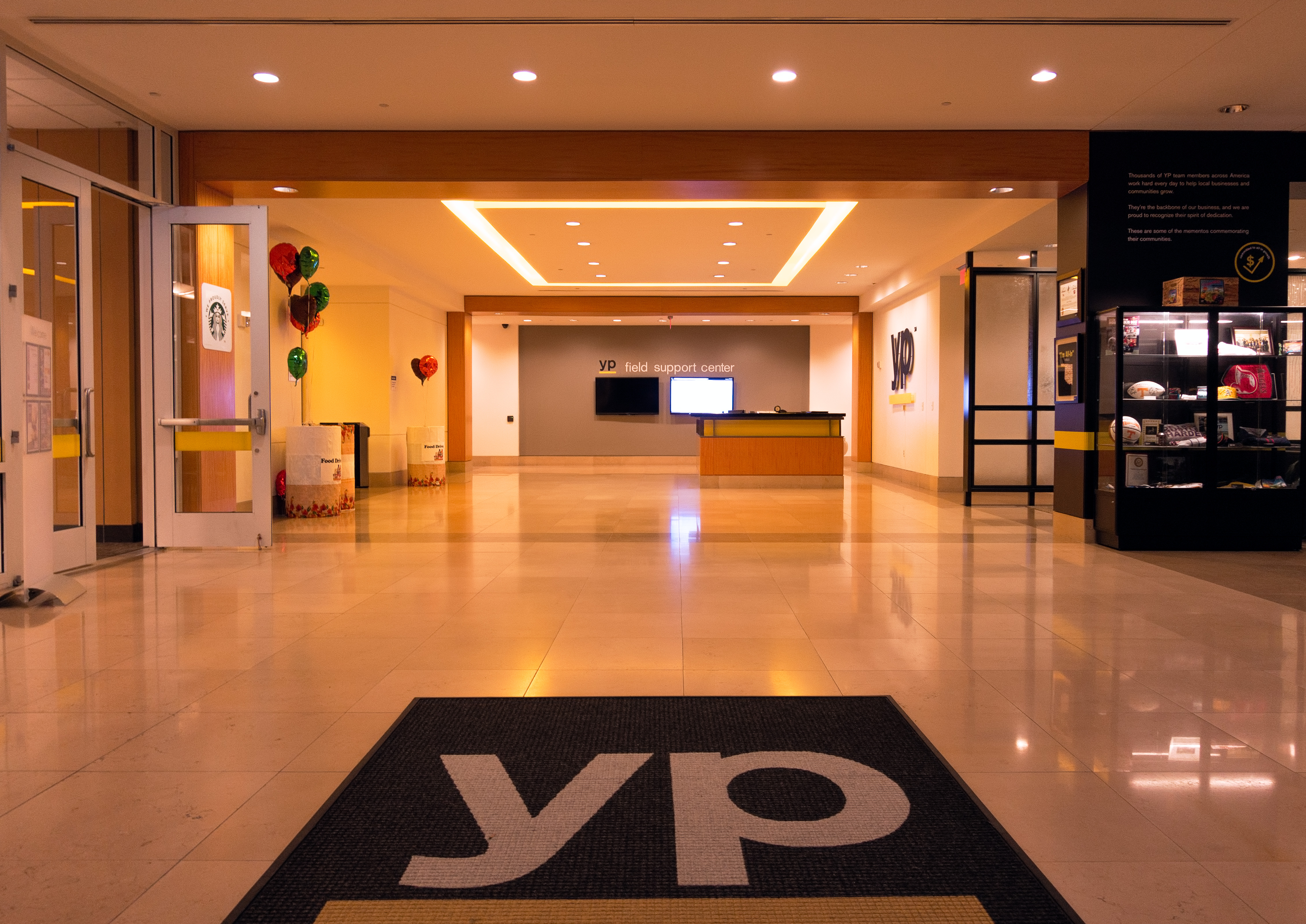
Entrance to the YP Headquarters, in Tucker Georgia

YP Holdings, now a wholly owned subsidiary of Thryv, is the American parent company for YP LLC. Its products include printed telephone directories, yp.com and YP app. YP offers local search, display ads and direct marketing. On July 31, 2012, YP was included in PaidContent50's list of "the world's most successful digital media companies" based on 2011 digital ad revenue.

The company was formed on April 4, 2012, preceding a formal announcement that AT&T would sell off a 53% stake in its directory operations to Cerberus Capital Management. Dex Media purchased YP Holdings LLC in 2017, officially announced in June 2017.

It is responsible for the publication yp.com, YP app, the Gas Guru app, and more than 1,300 printed directories, published under the "YP The Real Yellow Pages" brand. It is headquartered in Tucker, Georgia.

== History ==
YP Holdings, as a parent company, was founded in 2012 to take over the directory and online advertising businesses that were operated in the AT&T Advertising Solutions and AT&T Interactive divisions of AT&T.

=== SBC Yellow Pages ===
YELLOWPAGES.com, rebranded as YP.com in 2012, is an Internet web site operated by YP that employs sales representatives to sell preferred positioning on their site, YellowPages.com in addition to marketing additional products that move their clients' businesses toward the front of major web search pages.

SBC SMART Yellow Pages logo, 2002-2004

In 2002, SBC Communications dropped its regional telephone company names, switching to a unified "SBC" brand. As a result, the yellow pages operations were combined into one unit (retaining the separate companies) and took on the "SMART Yellow Pages" brand, retained from Pacific Bell Directory.

Southwestern Bell Yellow Pages headquarters were utilized as central headquarters for all SBC Yellow Pages operations in St. Louis, MO at One Bell Center.

SBC Yellow Pages logo, 2004-2005

In 2004, SBC sold complete control of the joint venture DonTech to R. H. Donnelley, the other co-owner. Telephone directories formerly published by SBC now became known as SBC Yellow Pages Published by R. H. Donnelley, and R. H. Donnelley's Illinois operations for SBC became known as the R. H. Donnelley Publishing & Advertising of Illinois Partnership. SBC merged Southwestern Bell Advertising, L.P. with Pacific Bell Directory's advertising division, creating SBC Advertising, L.P. As a result, "SMART" was eliminated as a nickname for all of the yellow pages operations, becoming simply SBC Yellow Pages.

In 2004 SBC Communications and Bell South Corp. acquired YELLOWPAGES.COM, Inc. which operated as a joint venture between the two companies, until Bell South was acquired by in 2006.

After 2004, R.H. Donnelley published printed directories in the names of SBC and subsequently AT&T in the area in and around Chicago, IL.

=== AT&T Yellow Pages ===
In 2005, SBC completed its acquisition of AT&T Corp., and renamed itself AT&T Inc. As a result, SBC Yellow Pages was renamed AT&T Yellow Pages, and the Illinois edition was renamed "AT&T Yellow Pages Published by R. H. Donnelley". SBC Advertising, L.P. was renamed AT&T Advertising, L.P. AT&T directory publishing companies began doing business as either AT&T Yellow Pages (in reference to being a directory publisher) or AT&T Directory Operations (in reference to being a unit of AT&T).

AT&T Yellow Pages logo, 2006-2007

=== AT&T Real Yellow Pages ===
AT&T Real Yellow Pages logo, 2007-2011

On December 29, 2006, AT&T added BellSouth Advertising & Publishing Corporation, or "BAPCO" to its roster of directory publishers. As a result, in January 2007, all companies who had been doing business as AT&T Yellow Pages started doing business as AT&T Advertising & Publishing, while the AT&T Yellow Pages name was retained.

On February 26, 2007, however, AT&T announced it would adopt BellSouth's directory branding, the Real Yellow Pages. All yellow pages directories published by AT&T became published under the AT&T Real Yellow Pages name.

=== YELLOWPAGES.com ===
YELLOWPAGES.com LLC. became part of AT&T Interactive, following the AT&T acquisition of Bellsouth in 2006.

YELLOWPAGES.com, rebranded as YP.com in 2009, as an Internet web site operated by YP. It employed more than 4,000 local marketing consultants and customer service professionals, and offered online presence, local search, display ads, and direct marketing. It was previously a wholly owned subsidiary of AT&T.

== Sale to Cerberus ==
On March 8, 2012, it was reported that AT&T had entered into talks to sell a controlling stake in its Yellow Pages business to Cerberus Capital Management and TPG Capital. The deal was estimated to be valued at $1.5 billion. Under the version of the deal reported in the press, AT&T would still own a minority stake in the company.

On April 9, 2012, it was announced that AT&T would sell 53% of AT&T Advertising Solutions to Cerberus Capital Management for $750 million. AT&T Advertising Solutions as a structural unit then became the company YP Holdings. Included in the sale is Yellowpages.com, YP mobile app as well as the printed directory division. AT&T will retain 47% ownership. Cerberus will assume $200 million of AT&T debt from the transaction.

The sale came after AT&T began removing branding from its directories. In 2011, it removed the trade names of its Bell Operating Companies (a practice adopted in 2002), reduced the size of the AT&T logo, and enlarged the "YP" logo of YELLOWPAGES.COM as the main logo of the directory. It also as renamed its directory "YP Real Yellow Pages".

The sale made AT&T the last Bell System-related spin off to sell off its yellow pages business. Cincinnati Bell sold off CBD Media in 2002, Qwest sold Dex Media in 2002, SBC sold off Illinois directory operations to R.H. Donnelley in 2004, and Verizon sold Idearc Media in 2006.

The deal with Cerberus officially closed on May 8, 2012.

In 2013, YP rebranded to position itself in the field of digital marketing, and in 2015, its marketing operations has been rebranded to YP Marketing Solutions.

Media Properties owned by YP LLC include:

1. YP.com (Yellowpages.com and mybook)
2. YP app (Gas Guru app)
3. Printed directories: The Real Yellow Pages directories and The Real White Pages directories
4. YP Marketing Solutions (YP for Business app)

=== Subsidiaries ===
AT&T transferred the directory publishing companies it owned to YP Holdings, as well as other companies that comprised AT&T Advertising Solutions and AT&T Interactive. These companies (with service regions) are organized as follows:

- YP Holdings
  - YP.com LLC
  - YP Marketing Solutions LLC
