= Thryv =

U.S. business services company

Thryv Holdings, Inc.
- Type: Public
- Traded as: Nasdaq: THRY
- Industry: Software; Marketing
- Founded: 2013; 13 years ago
- Headquarters: Dallas, Texas, U.S.
- Key people: Joe Walsh (CEO)
- Products: SaaS; Yellow Pages
- Revenue: ▼US$785 million (2025)
- Net income: ▲US$0.31 million (2025)
- Number of employees: 2,400+
- Website: thryv.com

Thryv Holdings, Inc. is a publicly traded software as a service (SaaS) company, providing customer relationship management and online reputation management software for small businesses. It has headquarters in Dallas, Texas, and operates in 48 states across the United States of America with more than 2,400 employees. The company began as a conglomerate of Yellow Pages companies. In June 2020, Thryv reported $1.3 billion in revenue over a twelve-month period.

== History ==
The company was created through a 2017 merger of Dex Media, a yellow pages publisher that restructured its debt in 2016 and YP Holdings, a yellow pages publisher. It published over 1,700 directories, both yellow and white pages, as well as search tools for businesses.

With the increasing transition to digital, mobile and online search, Thryv provides local businesses marketing products to drive customers to client sites.

The company rebranded on 15 July 2019 with a focus on its flagship software product. It reported $1.4 billion in revenue that year with a profit of $35.5 million. In October 2020, Thryv Holdings, Inc. went public through a direct listing on NASDAQ with a reported 40,000 SaaS clients.

In February 2021, the company announced a partnership with Lendio for Thryv subscribers to access Paycheck Protection Program loans and small business financing.
