= Frontier Communications of Connecticut =

US telecom company

The Southern New England Telephone Company
- Trade name: Frontier Communications of Connecticut
- Type: Subsidiary
- Industry: Telecommunications
- Founded: 1878; 148 years ago
- Headquarters: New Haven, Connecticut
- Key people: Dan McCarthy (chairman and CEO); Ken Arndt (East Region president); Paul Quick (SVP & General Manager, Connecticut); Edward O'Connor Jr. (Sales VP, Connecticut); Joseph Ferraiolo (Area General Manager, New Haven County); Zachary Tomblin (Area General Manager, Eastern Connecticut)
- Products: Local Telephone Service, Broadband
- Number of employees: 2700
- Parent: SNET (1986–1998); SBC/AT&T Inc. (1998–2014); Frontier (2014–2026); Verizon (2026-present)
- Website: http://www.frontier.com/

The Southern New England Telephone Company (SNET), doing business as Frontier Communications of Connecticut, is a local exchange carrier owned by Frontier Communications.

== History ==
It started operations on January 28, 1878, as the District Telephone Company of New Haven, in the U.S. state of Connecticut. It was the founder of the first telephone exchange, as well as the world's first telephone book. Since its inception, SNET has held a monopoly on most of the telephone services in the state of Connecticut; the only remaining exceptions are the Greenwich and Byram exchanges where Verizon New York provides telephone service.

SNET logo, 1969–1983

SNET and Cincinnati Bell were the only two companies in the Bell System in which the old AT&T only held a minority stake; at the time of the breakup of the Bell System on January 1, 1984, AT&T's stake in SNET was 19.6 percent. Therefore, both were considered independents rather than Bell Operating Companies.

=== Sale to SBC ===
SNET was purchased for $4.4 billion in 1998 by SBC Communications, which subsequently purchased the old AT&T, taking its name as the "new" AT&T. Under AT&T, SNET was known as AT&T Connecticut.

In 2006, AT&T merged the operations of SNET into AT&T Teleholdings, formerly Ameritech, making it a subsidiary of the latter.

On June 1, 2007, the operations of Woodbury Telephone were merged into SNET.

=== Sale to Frontier ===
On October 24, 2014, Frontier Communications completed its purchase of AT&T's Connecticut operations, including Southern New England Telephone and long-distance unit SNET America, for $2 billion. It was the second former unit of the Bell System to be acquired by Frontier, the first being Frontier West Virginia (originally C&P Telephone of West Virginia) which was purchased from Verizon in 2010.

=== Sale to Verizon ===
On September 5, 2024 Verizon announced that it will acquire Frontier Communications for $20 billion. This acquisition was completed on January 20, 2026. As a result, Verizon took control of Frontier's operations, including SNET.

== See also ==
- List of United States telephone companies
- ConnNet
