= InterConsult Bulgaria =

- Trade name: InterConsult Bulgaria (ICB)
- Industry: Computer Software
- Founded: 1996
- Founder: Stoian Boev
- Key people: Stoian Boev, Founder and CEO, Atanas Golev, Founder and Technical Director

InterConsult Bulgaria (ICB), established in Sofia, Bulgaria in 1996, is a Bulgarian software development and business consulting corporation. The company develops software for companies in several different fields, including industrial engineering, maritime services, banking and financial services.

== History ==
- 1996 – ICB is established as a Bulgarian-Norwegian company, part of the Norwegian IT consulting group Interconsult ASA.
- 2004 – Following the acquisition of Interconsult ASA and its shares in its subsidiaries, ICB becomes part of the Danish engineering consulting group COWI A/S.
- 2008 – With a management buyout performed by the company's Bulgarian founders, ICB becomes a 100% private Bulgarian company.
- 2010 – ICB Wins the European IT Excellence Award 2010 at IT Europa.
- 2011 – ICB Becomes a 100+ employee company.
- 2016 - ICB receives the 2016 Information & Document Management Solution Provider award.

== Key Projects ==
Client	Product
Kongsberg Digital	K-IMS (Kongsberg Information Management System), a software system for real-time monitoring, condition-based maintenance, and decision support for fleets of vessels and oil rigs.
Kongsberg Maritime	K-Tools Application Integration Solution
Kongsberg Maritime	Offshore Vessel Simulator software development
Kozloduy Nuclear Power Plant	Implementing Good Practices from ITIL
UniCredit Bulbank; United Bulgarian Bank; Emporiki Bank	Safe Bank; Safe Link
