= Illinois Bell =

Telecommunications utility company in Illinois, USA

Illinois Bell Telephone Company, LLC
- Type: Subsidiary
- Industry: Telecommunications
- Founded: 1920; 106 years ago
- Headquarters: Chicago, Illinois, United States
- Area served: Illinois, Indiana
- Products: Local Telephone Service
- Parent: American Bell (1881-1899); AT&T Corporation (1899-1983); Ameritech (1984-1999); AT&T Inc. (1999-present)

Illinois Bell Telephone Company, LLC is the Bell Operating Company serving Illinois in the United States. It was founded in 1920. Following the breakup of the Bell System, Illinois Bell came under ownership of Ameritech.
