= Southern New England Telecommunications =

American telecommunications company

Southern New England Telecommunications Corporation
- Company type: Subsidiary
- Industry: Telecommunications
- Founded: 1986; 40 years ago
- Defunct: 2006
- Successor: AT&T Teleholdings; Frontier Communications of Connecticut
- Headquarters: New Haven, Connecticut, United States
- Products: Local Telephone Service
- Parent: AT&T (1998–2006)

Southern New England Telecommunications Corporation (SNET) started operations in 1986 as the holding company for the Southern New England Telephone Company, the dominant local phone carrier in Connecticut, which had been a minority holding of AT&T until February 1986, when AT&T sold its 23% ownership. SNET then became its own company, operating a telecommunications sales division, Sonecor Systems Division, which began operations on January 1, 1983, and sold equipment in competition with AT&T before the Bell System divestiture. SNET also operated SNET America, which sold long-distance services to Southern New England Telephone customers within Connecticut.

Under threats of a hostile takeover, Southern New England Telephone underwent a restructuring in 1986, creating Southern New England Telecommunications as the holding company of SNET and its related businesses.

Southern New England Telecommunications was acquired by SBC Communications in 1998.

SNET Corporation was merged into AT&T Teleholdings, formerly Ameritech, in 2006 and ceased to exist.

== Sale of former assets ==
On December 17, 2013, AT&T announced plans to sell the former subsidiaries of SNET, The Southern New England Telephone Company and long-distance subsidiary SNET America, to Frontier Communications for $2 billion. The transaction closed on October 25, 2014.

On September 5, 2024, Verizon announced its intent to acquire Frontier for $20 billion, in a move to expand its fiber internet services. The acquisition was approved by Frontier shareholders in November 2024. On May 16, 2025, the Federal Communications Commission approved the acquisition.
