= Ameritech =

Subsidiary of AT&T

Ameritech Telecommunications Holdings, Inc.
- Final logo designed by Anspach Grossman Portugal from 1993 to 2002.
- Trade name: Ameritech
- Formerly: American Information Technologies Corporation; Ameritech Corporation; SBC Teleholdings, Inc.
- Type: Subsidiary
- Traded as: NYSE: AIT
- Industry: Telecommunications
- Predecessor: AT&T Corporation
- Founded: 1983; 43 years ago
- Defunct: 2002; 24 years ago
- Fate: Merged with SBC Communications
- Headquarters: Chicago, Illinois, United States
- Products: Telephone, Internet, Television
- Parent: AT&T Corporation (1983); SBC Communications (1999–2002)
- Subsidiaries: Illinois Bell; Indiana Bell; Michigan Bell; Ohio Bell; Pacific Bell; Wisconsin Bell

AT&T Teleholdings, Inc., formerly known as Ameritech Corporation (and, before that, American Information Technologies Corporation), was an American telecommunications company that arose out of the 1984 AT&T divestiture. Ameritech was one of the seven Regional Bell Operating Companies created following the breakup of the Bell System. Ameritech was acquired in 1999 by SBC Communications, which subsequently acquired AT&T Corporation in 2006, becoming the present-day AT&T.

== Overview ==
Ameritech was created as a holding company that owned five former Bell System companies in the Midwest. Under its umbrella were:

- Illinois Bell Telephone Company
- Indiana Bell Telephone Company, Inc.
- Michigan Bell Telephone Company
- Ohio Bell Telephone Company
- Wisconsin Bell, Inc.

For Ameritech's first nine years, it maintained these Bell brands inherited from the Bell System—though public displays of the Bell companies' names were often captioned "An Ameritech Company". In January 1993, Ameritech officially retired the Bell brands and marketed itself with solely the Ameritech name across all five states in its territory. It added "d/b/a Ameritech (state)" to the names of its Bells to communicate brand unity.

Ameritech also owned Ameritech Cellular, a wireless company that operated cellular networks in many of the major cities of these states. Ameritech Cellular was previously called Ameritech Mobile Communications. Ameritech also provided cable television service in select areas as part of the Americast venture with other phone companies during the 1990s.

Ameritech Advanced Data Services (AADS) Network Access Point (NAP) was one of the original four National Science Foundation exchange points in the United States starting in 1994. AADS was a Tier 1 network Internet Exchange Point in Chicago, Illinois that provided service to higher education and research networks via a program called Star TAP and commercial networks. After the merger with SBC, AADS did business as the SBC Network Access Point or SBC/AADS NAP.

Ameritech logo, 1984–1993

Ameritech's final logo, 1993–2002

Prior to its merger with SBC Communications, Ameritech's corporate headquarters were in a leased space above the Chicago Mercantile Exchange on floors 34 through 39 of 30 S Wacker Dr, Chicago. Further corporate offices were located at 225 W Randolph St, Chicago (formerly "The Illinois Bell Building") and 2000 W. Ameritech Center Drive, Hoffman Estates) ("The Ameritech Center"). It was traded on the NYSE under the "AIT" symbol.

== Merger with SBC Communications ==
Ameritech logo, 1999–2001

In May 1998, Ameritech announced its intent to merge with SBC Communications for $62 billion. This brought great concern to Federal and state regulators, who in turn did not approve the merger until SBC and Ameritech agreed to several conditions to ensure adequate competition. Most notably, regulators required:

- that the merged company offer local phone service in thirty markets outside of its home territory within thirty months of the merger (i.e. by April 2002) or pay a $1.18B penalty
- and that Ameritech Cellular assets in Chicago be sold to GTE in 1999, which later merged with Bell Atlantic to form Verizon in June 2000. Since SBC already had a majority stake in a large mobile provider (Cellular One), the merged company, if it were to operate Ameritech Cellular and Cellular One both in the same market, would have wielded too much market power.

On October 6, 1999, the Federal Communications Commission (FCC) approved the merger between SBC and Ameritech, then the two companies officially merged on October 8, 1999. Prior to the merger, Ameritech's Chairman and CEO was Richard Notebaert, who later (in 2002) became CEO of competitor Qwest.

=== The end of the Ameritech name ===
SBC Teleholdings, Inc. logo, 2002–2006

On January 15, 2003, SBC Communications changed its d.b.a. names, changed the legal name of Ameritech Corp. to SBC Teleholdings, Inc., which began doing business as SBC Midwest. On January 15, 2006, d.b.a names were again changed to align with SBC's assumption of the AT&T brand identity following its acquisition of AT&T Corp. the previous year, and Ameritech was again renamed, becoming AT&T Teleholdings, Inc. and began doing business as AT&T Midwest.

Several Ameritech subsidiaries remain legally named "Ameritech", such as Ameritech Advanced Services; however, they do business as "AT&T Advanced Solutions".

In 2006, the holding companies Pacific Telesis and Southern New England Telecommunications were legally merged into AT&T Teleholdings. The company then became a holding company for Pacific Bell (and its subsidiary Nevada Bell) and Southern New England Telephone.

== See also ==
- Ameritech Library Services (Dynix)
