= AT&T =

American telecommunications company

AT&T Inc.
- Logo used since 2016

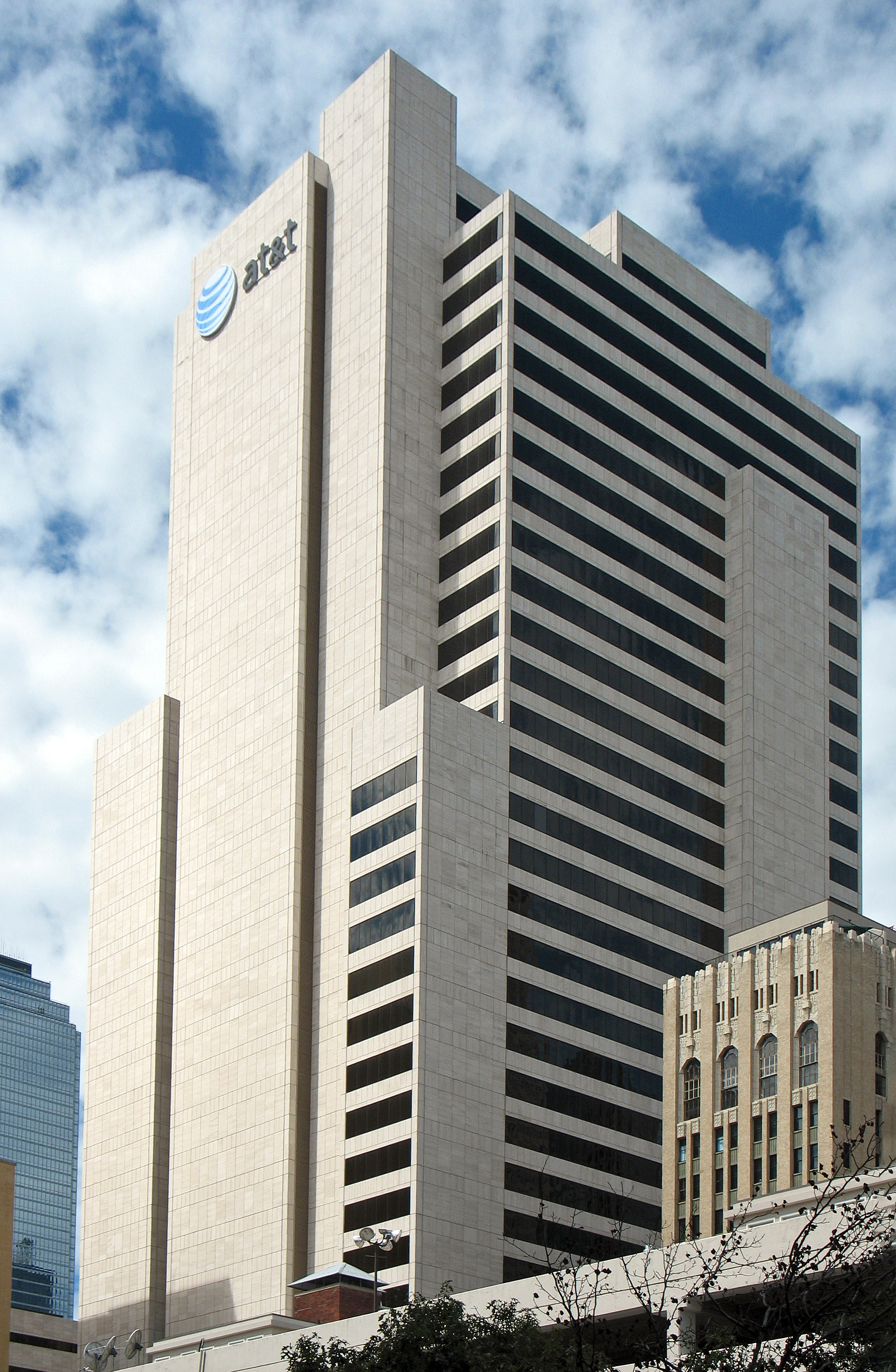
- Whitacre Tower, AT&T's corporate headquarters in Dallas
- Formerly: Southwestern Bell Corporation (1983–1995); SBC Communications Inc. (1995–2005)
- Type: Public
- Traded as: NYSE: T; S&P 100 component; S&P 500 component
- ISIN: US00206R1023
- Industry: Telecommunications
- Predecessors: Southwestern Bell; Pacific Telesis; Ameritech; AT&T Corporation; BellSouth
- Founded: October 5, 1983; 43 years ago (as Southwestern Bell); November 18, 2005; 21 years ago (as AT&T)
- Founder: Zane Edison Barnes; Edward Whitacre
- Headquarters: Whitacre Tower, Dallas, Texas, United States
- Area served: U.S. and Mexico (consumer services); Worldwide (business and IoT services)
- Key people: John Stankey (CEO and Chairman); Jeremy Legg (CTO); Jeff McElfresh (COO)
- Products: Fixed telephony; Mobile telephony; Broadband; Internet television; IoT
- Brands: AT&T Mobility; AT&T Internet; Cricket Wireless
- Revenue: ▲US$125.65 billion (2025)
- Operating income: ▲US$24.16 billion (2025)
- Net income: ▲US$23.39 billion (2025)
- Total assets: ▲US$420.2 billion (2025)
- Total equity: ▲US$127.1 billion (2025)
- Number of employees: 133,030 (2025)
- Divisions: AT&T Communications; AT&T Latin America
- Subsidiaries: Cricket Wireless
- ASN: 7018
- Website: att.com
- Footnotes; Financials as of fiscal year ended December 31, 2025. References

AT&T Inc., an abbreviation of its predecessor's original name, the American Telephone and Telegraph Company, is an American multinational telecommunications holding company headquartered at the Whitacre Tower in Downtown Dallas, Texas. AT&T is the world's third-largest telecommunications company by revenue, the third-largest wireless carrier in the United States behind T-Mobile and Verizon, and the nation's largest fiber internet provider. On the New York Stock Exchange, AT&T trades under the ticker symbol "T", and has a market capitalization of $186.83 billion. On the Fortune 500 (2025) AT&T ranked 37th among the largest American businesses and reported revenues of $125.6 billion last year.

AT&T has over 240 million subscribers worldwide, and its operations are split into two main segments: Communications, which offers wireless services, broadband options, and business solutions, along with Latin America, which provides wireless networking in Mexico. Even after spinning off DirecTV, AT&T still offers bundling deals with it. While AT&T traces its history to the original company founded in 1885, the modern version began on January 1, 1984, as Southwestern Bell Corporation (SBC Communications) after the Bell System breakup. The original AT&T was created by American Bell Telephone on March 5, 1885, as a long-distance subsidiary, and later merged with its corporate parent in 1889. Over time, AT&T developed a natural monopoly in telephony, dominating telecommunications for much of the 20th century and earning the nickname "Ma Bell".

The U.S. Department of Justice filed an antitrust lawsuit against AT&T under the Sherman Antitrust Act, arguing it held unfair advantages over other telecom companies through the Bell System. Despite fighting the case, AT&T settled in 1982 to break up the Bell System into seven independent companies. AT&T was allowed to retain its long-lines and technology divisions and it ventured into new industries. SBC, which originated from ADT Inc., was the smallest "Baby Bell" and it grew by acquiring Pacific Telesis and Ameritech. AT&T later spun off Lucent Technologies along with its wireless and broadband units, leading to an uncertain future. In 2005, SBC Communications bought AT&T Corporation and adopted its branding to become the modern AT&T.

Since reforming, AT&T bought BellSouth, reuniting four of the seven Baby Bells and taking control of Cingular Wireless (now AT&T Mobility). AT&T also shifted toward content distribution by launching U-verse TV, acquiring DirecTV, and expanding into entertainment with the purchase of Time Warner. These moves were intended to transform AT&T into a vertically integrated media-telecom giant, but lackluster synergies led to DirecTV being sold to TPG Inc., and WarnerMedia merging with Discovery, Inc. to form Warner Bros. Discovery (now Skydance Corporation). Today, AT&T is focusing its efforts on 5G connectivity and fiber optic networks.

== Historical overview ==
Evolution of AT&T
- 1885: The American Bell company established the original iteration of AT&T to develop and operate the first long-distanced telephone network in the United States
- 1899: With the emergence of thousands of independent telephone companies, American Bell oversaw the transfer of its businesses to its subsidiary, AT&T
- 1901: AT&T underwent an initial public offering on the New York Stock Exchange, and embarked on a years-long acquisition spree to expand its telephone network
- 1907: Investors led by J.P. Morgan gained control over an indebted AT&T, and they appointed Theodore Vail as CEO to carry out goals for a telephone monopoly
- 1911: Morgan's financial backing allowed AT&T to buy hundreds of telephone companies and merge them into local operators, helping form the basis of the Bell System
- 1913: The Kingsbury Commitment enforced new regulations on AT&T by requiring its long-distance network to interconnect and secure approval for any acquisition
- 1918: A one-year wartime measure done by the U.S. Government briefly nationalized the telecom sector in the United States and placed it under the management of AT&T
- 1922: Even after the wartime measure ended, AT&T's competition had effectively been eliminated, and the Willis Graham Act helped solidify it as a monopoly
- 1925: Bell Laboratories was founded as AT&T's research and development division, and it would oversee numerous inventions that contributed to modern technology
- 1930: AT&T entered the 1930s as the world's largest company by total asset valuation and remained one of the most profitable corporations for the next several decades
- 1947: Researchers at Bell Labs developed the Transistor, and by the 1950s, it became a revolutionary due to its efficiency
- 1956: A consent decree between AT&T and the U.S. Department of Justice restricted the company to its native field of telephony
- 1974: After many unsuccessful lawsuits, the Justice Department sued AT&T in an antitrust lawsuit and sought to dismantle the Bell System piece by piece
- 1983: AT&T settled in 1982 and prepared for the Bell System breakup. Bell Labs assumed Western Electric's assets and was placed under AT&T Technologies
- 1984: Once the Bell System ended and became seven regional companies, AT&T entered into computing
- 1996: In preparation for relaxed regulations, AT&T separated NCR Corporation and Lucent Technologies into public companies and formed AT&T Labs
- 1999: Southwestern Bell grew throughout the late 1990s by acquiring Pacific Telesis and Ameritech while AT&T became the largest American cable operator
- 2002: Due to mounting debt, AT&T separated its cable and wireless divisions, and those companies were acquired by Comcast and Cingular Wireless
- 2005: Southwestern Bell acquired AT&T Corporation and adopted its branding as the modern iteration of AT&T
- 2007: Shortly after acquiring BellSouth, AT&T rebranded Cingular as AT&T Mobility and secured a four-year exclusivity contract with the newly released iPhone
- 2011: AT&T attempted to acquire T-Mobile US from Deutsche Telekom, but after the deal faced a lawsuit from regulators, the merger was eventually cancelled
- 2015: DirecTV was acquired and brought under AT&T Communications, while AT&T expanded its presence in Mexico
- 2018: Wanting to achieve vertical integration, AT&T bought out Time Warner and rebranded it as WarnerMedia
- 2020: HBO Max was released by WarnerMedia as the company's core streaming service to combat cord-cutting in pay televison
- 2022: AT&T and Discovery, Inc. conducted a Reverse Morris Trust and merged WarnerMedia into a separate company called Warner Bros. Discovery
- 2026: AT&T acquired the fiber internet assets of Lumen Technologies and celebrated 125 years of being a publicly traded company on the New York Stock Exchange

=== Origin and growth (1877–1981) ===
After patenting the telephone on March 7, 1876, Alexander Graham Bell and his associates co-founded the Bell Telephone Company on July 9, 1877, with members like Thomas A. Watson, Gardiner Greene Hubbard and Thomas A. Sanders. Although Bell was viewed as the company's founder, he lost interest in telephony by the 1890s and sold off his stock holdings. Bell Telephone focused on building local telephone exchanges and oversaw the first commercial exchange in New Haven, Connecticut. Bell Telephone expanded quickly, and over 700 telephones in use across the country by 1877. An early rival was Western Union, then the leading telegraph company, which also owned Western Electric, a major equipment manufacturer. In 1880, construction began on what would eventually become AT&T Long Lines. Bell acquired Western Electric in 1881 and established the American Telephone and Telegraph Company on March 3, 1885.

Theodore Newton Vail served as the company's first President but he stepped down after a few years. When Alexander Graham Bell's telephone patent expired, more than 6,000 telephony companies emerged, resulting in a major downturn for Bell Telephone. On December 30, 1899, American Bell transferred its subsidiaries to AT&T, giving the long-distance company control over Western Electric, Bell Laboratories, Western Union, the Bell System, and the international holdings of Northern Electric, IBT, and Bell Canada. AT&T controlled over 80% of the U.S. telephone system market by 1907 and Theodore Newton Vail rejoined the company as its President. Vail negotiated with competitors, charging them fees for connecting to AT&T's long-distance network. These practices led the Justice Department to attempt to breakup AT&T, but a settlement was reached through the Kingsbury Commitment on December 13, 1913. It brought federal oversight into AT&T and led its Bell System monopoly to become federally regulated.

In 1921 AT&T served over 64% of the nearly 14 million U.S. telephones and its dominance continued into the 1930s, with its market share reaching 83% of all U.S. telephones, 98% of long-distance lines, and 90% of equipment manufacturing. Through this, AT&T became a natural monopoly, with each of its subsidiaries giving it an unrivaled position in telecommunications. Federal oversight sustained AT&T's monopoly through the Great Depression, World War II, and the postwar era, but following the 1974 modification of the final judgement, the DOJ filed an antitrust lawsuit against AT&T. The case, United States of America v. American Telephone & Telegraph Co., et al., lasted for nearly eight years until AT&T settled in 1982 in exchange for divesting the Bell System monopoly. The Bell System was separated into seven independently operated telecom companies on January 1, 1984.

==== Breakup and reformation (1982–2004) ====
AT&T Corporation

In 1982, U.S. regulators broke up the AT&T monopoly, requiring AT&T to divest its local subsidiaries, which it did by grouping them into seven individual companies. These new companies were known as Regional Bell Operating Companies, or more informally, Baby Bells. Southwestern Bell Corporation (SBC) was one of the companies created by the breakup of AT&T Corp. (Later renamed SBC Communications Inc.)

AT&T continued to operate long-distance services but faced increasing competition from competitors such as MCI and Sprint.

AT&T soon started a series of acquisitions, including the 1987 acquisition of Metromedia mobile business and the acquisition of several cable companies in the early 1990s. Meanwhile, in the latter half of the 1990s, SBC acquired several other telecommunications companies, including two Baby Bells (Pacific Telesis Group and Ameritech Corporation), while selling its cable business. In early 1997 C. Michael Armstrong was named CEO, and Armstrong appointed John Zeglis as president later in that same year. By 1998, the company was in the top 15 of the Fortune 500, and by 1999, when Zeglis assumed the positions of chairman and CEO of AT&T Wireless, AT&T was part of the Dow Jones Industrial Average (lasting through 2015). Zeglis ended his service as president of AT&T in 2001 and resigned from his positions in AT&T Wireless in 2004.

==== Purchase of former parent and acquisitions (2005–2013) ====
On November 18, 2005, SBC Communications purchased its former parent, AT&T Corporation, for $16 billion. After this purchase, SBC adopted the better-known AT&T name and brand, with the original AT&T Corporation still existing as the long-distance landline subsidiary of the merged company. The current AT&T Inc. claims the original AT&T Corporation's history (dating to 1877) as its own, but retains SBC's pre-2005 corporate structure and stock price history. As well, all SEC filings before 2005 are under SBC, not AT&T.

AT&T made an attempt in 2011 to purchase T-Mobile for a $39 billion stock and cash offer. The bid was withdrawn after the takeover company was faced with significant regulatory and legal hurdles, along with heavy resistance from the U.S. government. As per the original acquisition agreement, T-Mobile received $3 billion in cash as well as access to $1 billion worth of AT&T-held wireless spectrum.

In September 2013, AT&T announced it would expand into Latin America through a collaboration with América Móvil. In December 2013, AT&T announced plans to sell its Connecticut wireline operations to Stamford-based Frontier Communications. AT&T acquired BellSouth Corporation on December 29, 2006, following FCC approval. The transaction consolidated ownership and management of Cingular Wireless. AT&T rebranded its wireless retail stores from Cingular to AT&T in January 2007.

== Recent developments (2013–present) ==
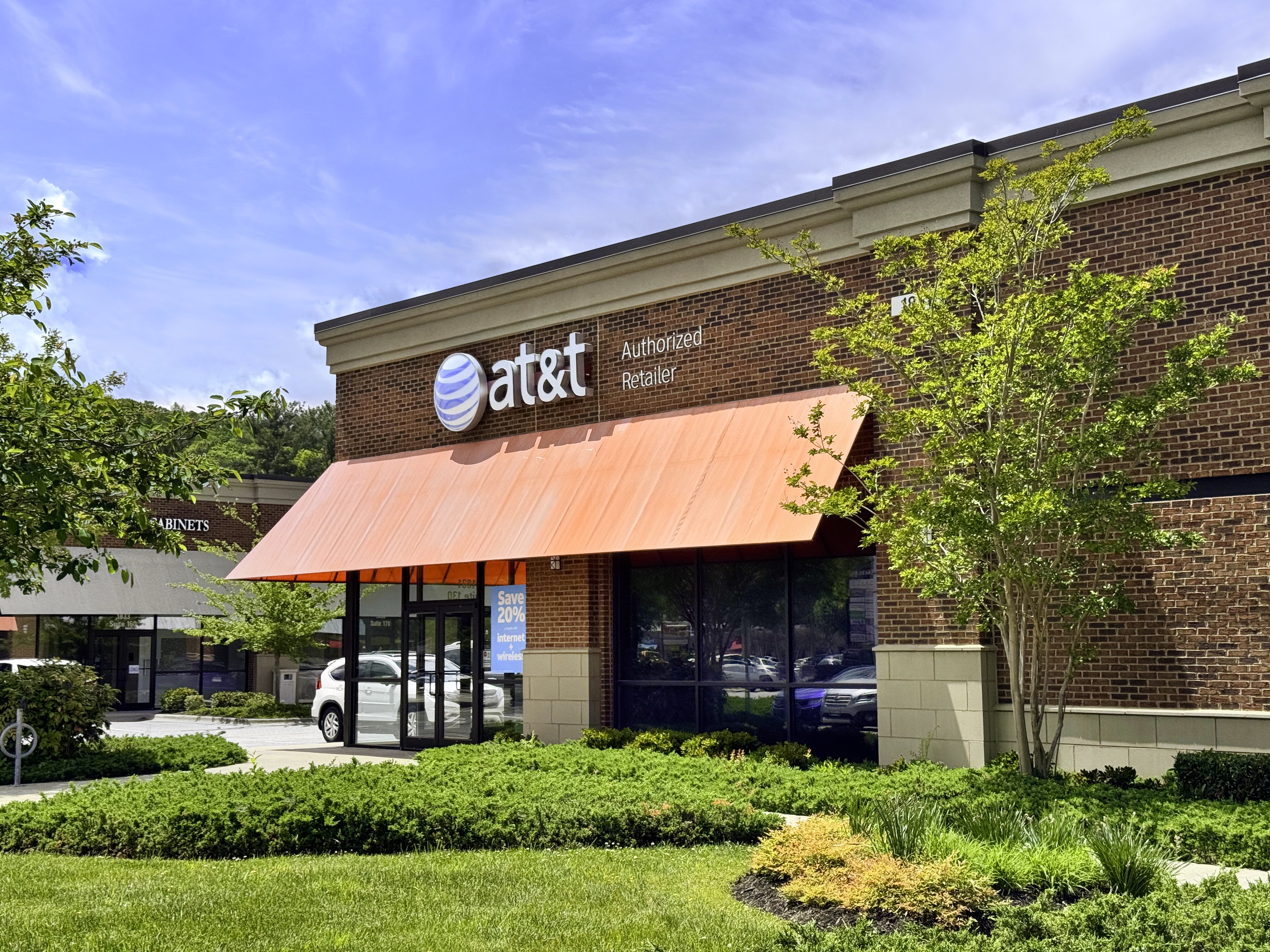
An AT&T retail store in Asheville, North Carolina

=== Media pivot and divesture ===
In late 2014, AT&T purchased Mexican cellular carrier Iusacell, and two months later, it purchased the Mexican wireless business of NII Holdings. AT&T merged the two companies to create AT&T Mexico. In July 2015, AT&T purchased DirecTV for $48.5 billion. AT&T then announced plans to converge its existing U-verse home internet and IPTV brands with DirecTV, to create AT&T Entertainment.

On October 22, 2016, AT&T announced a deal to buy Time Warner for $108.7 billion in an effort to increase its media holdings. On November 20, 2017, Assistant Attorney General Makan Delrahim filed a lawsuit for the United States Department of Justice Antitrust Division to block the merger with Time Warner, saying it "will harm competition, result in higher bills for consumers and less innovation". On June 12, 2018, U.S. District Court Judge Richard J. Leon ruled that the merger could go forward. The merger closed two days afterwards, with Time Warner becoming a wholly owned subsidiary of AT&T. A day later, the company was renamed WarnerMedia. Three months after completing the acquisition, AT&T reorganized into four main units: Communications, including consumer and business wireline telephony, AT&T Mobility, and consumer entertainment video services; WarnerMedia, including Turner cable television networks, Warner Bros. film and television production, and HBO; AT&T Latin America, consisting of wireless service in Mexico and video in Latin America and the Caribbean under the Vrio brand; and Advertising and Analytics, since renamed Xandr.

On July 13, 2017, it was reported that AT&T would introduce a cloud-based DVR streaming service. It hoped to create a unified platform across DirecTV and its DirecTV Now streaming service, with U-verse to be added shortly afterward. The service, named HBO Max, launched in May 2020. On September 12, 2017, it was reported that AT&T planned to launch a new cable TV-like service for delivery over-the-top over its own or a competitor's broadband network sometime the following year. On March 7, 2018, the company prepared to sell a minority stake of DirecTV Latin America through an IPO, creating a new holding company for those assets named Vrio Corp. On April 18, just a day before the public debut of Vrio, AT&T canceled the IPO due to market conditions.

As of 2019, AT&T is the world's largest telecommunications company. AT&T is also the largest provider of mobile telephone services and the largest provider of fixed telephone (landline) services in the United States. In September 2019, activist investor Elliott Management revealed that it had purchased $3.2 billion of AT&T stock (a 1.2% equity interest), and had pushed for the company to divest assets to improve its share value. On March 4, 2020, AT&T announced its intent to perform major cost-cutting moves, including cuts to capital investment, and plans to promote AT&T TV (which officially launched nationally on March 2) as its primary pay television service offering. AT&T stated it would still primarily promote DirecTV "where cable broadband is not prevalent", and as a specialty option. On April 24, 2020, AT&T announced that effective July 1, 2020, company COO John Stankey would replace Randall L. Stephenson as CEO of AT&T. It was also acknowledged that AT&T's acquisitions of DirecTV and Time Warner had by this point resulted in a massive debt burden of $200 billion for the company.

As a result of planned cost cutting programs, the sale of Warner Bros. Interactive Entertainment was proposed, but ultimately abandoned due to COVID-19 pandemic-related growth in the video gaming industry, as well as a positive reception to upcoming DC Comics, Lego Star Wars, and Harry Potter titles from fans and critics.

Crunchyroll was sold to Sony's Funimation for US$1.175 billion in December 2020, with the acquisition closing in August 2021. On February 25, 2021, AT&T announced that it would spin-off DirecTV, U-Verse TV, and DirecTV Stream into a separate entity, selling a 30% stake to TPG Capital (owners of Astound Broadband cable), while retaining a 70% stake in the new standalone company. The deal was closed on August 2, 2021. On May 17, 2021, AT&T announced plans to relinquish its equity interest in WarnerMedia, and have it merge with Discovery, Inc. in a US$43 billion deal to establish a new media company. Electronic Arts, which was a bidder in the proposed sale of Warner Bros Interactive Entertainment, purchased the mobile gaming studio Playdemic from WBIE for US$1.4 billion in June 2021. In September 2021, Fox Corporation acquired TMZ from WarnerMedia in a deal worth about $50 million with TMZ being operated under the Fox Entertainment division.

On December 21, 2021, AT&T announced that they had agreed to sell Xandr (and AppNexus) to Microsoft for an undisclosed price. The deal was completed in June 2022. On April 8, 2022, the spinoff of WarnerMedia and its subsequent merger with Discovery, Inc. to form Warner Bros. Discovery was completed. As a result of this merger, HBO Max and other video services were dropped from AT&T's unlimited plan offering. On July 2, 2025, AT&T and TPG Capital closed the sale of the remaining 70% stake in DirecTV.

On September 12, 2025, AT&T announced its partnership with Gigs to enable more U.S. tech companies like Klarna or Walmart's OnePay to launch their own mobile services.

=== 2024 Snowflake data breach ===
In 2024, AT&T was one of several clients of Snowflake Inc. that had data stolen in as part of the mass 2024 Snowflake data breach. Phone and text logs from May 1, 2022 to October 31, 2022 of "nearly all" AT&T customers were exposed as part of the breach. This hack is the first cyber incident in which the Justice Department has asked a company to delay filing a disclosure with the SEC because of potential national security or public safety concerns.

AT&T was also reported to have been affected by a 2024 attack from the Salt Typhoon advanced persistent threat linked to the Chinese government.

=== Acquisition of Lumen Technologies' connectivity business ===
On May 21, 2025, AT&T announced an agreement to purchase Lumen Technologies' mass-market fiber business for $5.75 billion, extending AT&T's terrestrial broadband connectivity footprint across additional states in the US (including most of former Baby Bell US West's territory). The transaction excludes Lumen's legacy copper-based consumer telephone network which is slated to be retired in the upcoming years. The transaction closed on February 2, 2026.

== Company structure ==
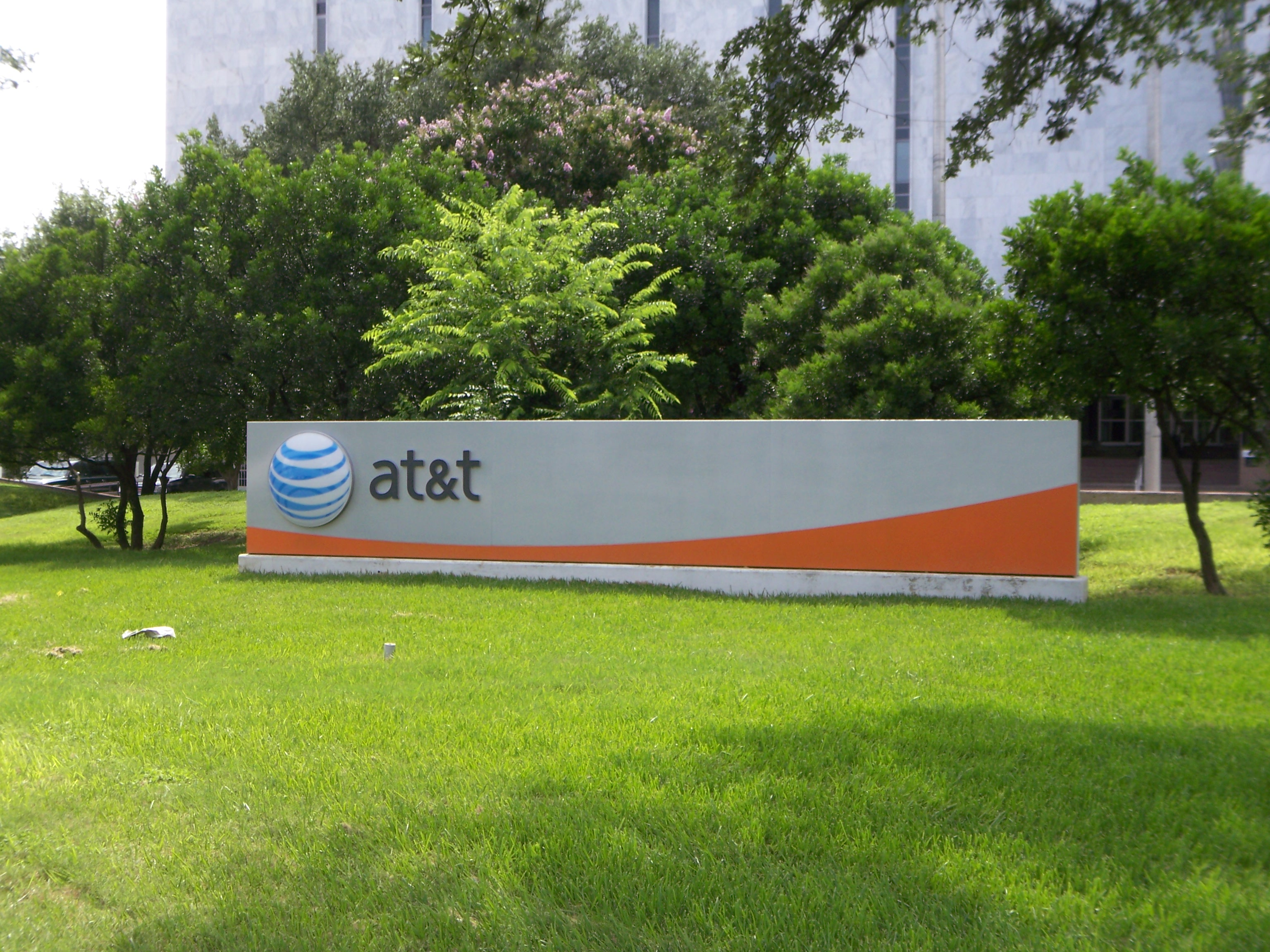
An AT&T office in San Antonio, Texas

AT&T Communications: AT&T Communications is the principal segment of AT&T and has more than 100 million American customers.

=== Facilities and regions ===
AT&T’s global headquarters has been at Whitacre Tower in Dallas, Texas since 2005. In January 2026, the company announced it would be moving its headquarters from Dallas to a 54-acre (22 ha) campus in Plano, Texas. The move is expected to begin in late 2028.

SBC Communications was based in San Antonio, but after rebranding as AT&T, it moved to Dallas in 2008. The company is headquartered at Whitacre Tower in downtown Dallas, Texas. On June 27, 2008, AT&T announced that it would move its corporate headquarters from downtown San Antonio to One AT&T Plaza in downtown Dallas. The company said that it moved to gain better access to its customers and operations throughout the world, and to the key technology partners, suppliers, innovation and human resources needed as it continues to grow, domestically and internationally.

AT&T Inc. previously relocated its corporate headquarters to San Antonio from St. Louis, Missouri, in 1992, when it was then named Southwestern Bell Corporation. The company's Telecom Operations group, which serves residential and regional business customers in 22 U.S. states, remains in San Antonio. Atlanta, Georgia, continues to be the headquarters for AT&T Mobility, with significant offices in Redmond and Bothell, Washington, Redmond is the former home of AT&T Wireless. Bedminster, New Jersey, is the headquarters for the company's Global Business Services group and AT&T Labs. St. Louis continues as home to the company's Directory operations, AT&T Advertising Solutions.

AT&T also offers services in many locations throughout the Asia Pacific; its regional headquarters is located in Hong Kong. The company is also active in Mexico, and on November 7, 2014, it was announced that Mexican carrier Iusacell would be acquired by AT&T. The acquisition was approved in January 2015. On April 30, 2015, AT&T acquired wireless operations Nextel Mexico from NII Holdings (now AT&T Mexico).

=== Board of directors ===
AT&T's board of directors as of February 2026 are:

- William Kennard – Chairman
- Scott T. Ford
- Glenn Hutchins
- Stephen J. Luczo
- Marissa Mayer
- Michael McCallister
- Beth E. Mooney
- Matthew K. Rose
- John Stankey
- Cynthia B. Taylor
- Luis Ubiñas

Executive management

- John Stankey – Chief executive officer
- Thaddeus Arroyo – Chief Strategy and Development Officer
- Pascal Desroches – Senior Executive Vice President & Chief financial officer
- Ed Gillespie – Senior Executive Vice President – External and Legislative Affairs
- Kellyn Smith Kenny – Chief Marketing & Growth Officer
- Lori Lee – CEO – AT&T Latin America & Global Marketing Officer
- Jeremy Legg – Chief Technology Officer, AT&T Services, Inc.
- David R. McAtee II – Senior Executive Vice President and General counsel
- Jeff McElfresh – Chief operating officer

== Landline operating companies ==
Of the eight companies that were part of the breakup of the Bell System, the following five are a part of the current AT&T:

- Ameritech, acquired by SBC in 1999
- AT&T Corp., acquired by SBC in 2005
- BellSouth, acquired by AT&T in 2006
- Pacific Telesis, acquired by SBC in 1997
- Southwestern Bell, rebranded as SBC Communications in 1995

In addition, in May 2025, AT&T announced the purchase of Lumen Technologies' mass-market fiber connectivity business which will bring former Baby Bell US West's territory into its terrestrial service footprint.

=== Baby Bells chart ===
AT&T Corporation; RBOC grouped into "Baby Bells" split off in 1984
BellSouth	AT&T Corporation (non-LEC)	Ameritech	Pacific Telesis	Southwestern Bell (later SBC Communications)	Bell Atlantic	NYNEX	US West
GTE (non-RBOC ILEC)	Qwest (non-ILEC)
Verizon
AT&T (former SBC)
CenturyLink (non-RBOC ILEC)
AT&T	Verizon	Lumen Technologies

=== Current states ===
==== Wireline connections ====
AT&T provides wireline (copper-based) service in 22 states:

- Alabama
- Arizona
- Arkansas
- California
- Florida
- Georgia
- Illinois
- Indiana
- Kansas
- Kentucky
- Louisiana
- Michigan
- Mississippi
- Missouri
- Nevada
- North Carolina
- Ohio
- Oklahoma
- South Carolina
- Tennessee
- Texas
- Wisconsin

AT&T plans to retire copper-based service in most of its US footprint by 2030 and transition most customers to fiber-optic based service. Customers not served by its fiber-optic network will be offered its wireless-based AT&T Phone – Advanced service.

==== Fiber-optic connections ====
As of 2026, AT&T provides fiber–to–the–premises connectivity in 32 states:

- Alabama
- Arizona
- Arkansas
- California
- Colorado
- Florida
- Georgia
- Illinois
- Indiana
- Iowa
- Kansas
- Kentucky
- Louisiana
- Michigan
- Minnesota
- Mississippi
- Missouri
- Nebraska
- Nevada
- New Mexico
- North Carolina
- North Dakota
- Ohio
- Oklahoma
- Oregon
- South Carolina
- South Dakota
- Tennessee
- Texas
- Utah
- Washington
- Wisconsin

=== Former operating companies ===
The following companies have become defunct or were sold under SBC/AT&T ownership:

- Woodbury Telephone merged with Southern New England Telephone on June 1, 2007.
- Southern New England Telephone was sold to Frontier Communications in 2014.

=== Decline of rural landlines ===
Of the Baby Bells, Ameritech sold some of its Wisconsin landlines to CenturyTel in 1998; BellSouth sold some of its lines to MebTel during the 2000s; US West sold many historically Bell landlines to Lynch Communications and Pacific Telecom in the 1990s; Verizon sold many of its New England lines to FairPoint Communications in 2008 and sold its Frontier West Virginia operations to Frontier Communications in 2010.

On October 25, 2014, Frontier Communications took over control of the AT&T landline network in Connecticut after being approved by state utility regulators. The deal was worth about $2 billion and included Frontier inheriting about 2,500 of AT&T's employees and many of AT&T's buildings.

== Political involvement ==
According to OpenSecrets, AT&T was the fourteenth-largest donor to United States federal political campaigns and committees from 1989 to 2019, having contributed more than US$84.1 million, 58% of which went to Republicans and 42% of which went to Democrats. In 2005, AT&T was among 53 entities that contributed the maximum of $250,000 to the second inauguration of President George W. Bush. Bill Leahy, representing AT&T, sits on the Private Enterprise Board of the American Legislative Exchange Council (ALEC). ALEC is a nonprofit organization of conservative state legislators and private sector representatives that drafts and shares model state-level legislation for distribution among state governments in the United States.

During the period of 1998 to 2019, the company expended US$380.1 million on lobbying in the United States. A key political issue for AT&T has been the question of which businesses win the right to profit by providing broadband internet access in the United States. The company has also lobbied in support of several federal bills. AT&T supported the Federal Communications Commission Process Reform Act of 2013 (H.R. 3675; 113th Congress), a bill that would make a number of changes to procedures that the U.S. Federal Communications Commission (FCC) follows in its rulemaking processes. The FCC would have to act in a more transparent way as a result of this bill, forced to accept public input about regulations. AT&T's Executive Vice President of Federal Relations, Tim McKone, said that the bill's "much needed institutional reforms will help arm the agency with the tools to keep pace with the Internet speed of today's marketplace. It will also ensure that outmoded regulatory practices for today's competitive marketplace are properly placed in the dustbin of history."

In May 2018, reports emerged that AT&T made 12 monthly payments between January and December 2017 to Essential Consultants, a company set up by President Donald Trump's lawyer Michael Cohen, totaling $600,000. Although initial reports on May 8 mentioned only four monthly payments totaling $200,000, documents obtained by the Washington Post on May 10 confirmed the figure of 12 payments, which had begun three days after the President was sworn into office. AT&T confirmed the report the same day. The report from The Washington Post, as well as additional reporting from Bloomberg, revealed the payments had been made for Cohen to "provide guidance" relating to the attempted $85 billion merger with Time Warner, to gain information on the Trump administration's planned tax reforms, as well as about potential changes to net neutrality policies under the new FCC. Chairman of the FCC Ajit Pai denied Cohen ever inquired about net neutrality on AT&T's behalf. A spokesperson for AT&T said that the company had been contacted by the Special Counsel investigation led by Robert Mueller regarding the payments, and had provided all the information requested in November and December 2017.

In early 2019 the Democratic House Judiciary requested records related to the AT&T-Time Warner merger from the White House.

While it has expressed support for LGBTQ causes, AT&T has also donated to sponsors of legislation described by some as anti-transgender in several US states, especially those predominantly Republican-governed, including Arkansas, Tennessee, North Carolina, Texas and Florida.

== Historical financial performance ==
The financial performance of the company is reported to shareholders on an annual basis and a matter of public record. Where performance has been restated, the most recent statement of performance from an annual report is used.

Performance measurements, by year
Measurement	2001	2002	2003	2004	2005	2006	2007	2008	2009	2010	2011	2012	2013	2014	2015	2016	2017	2018	2019
Revenues (billion USD)	45.38	43.14	40.50	40.79	43.86	63.06	118.9	124.0	122.5	124.8	126.7	127.4	128.8	132.4	146.8	163.8	160.5	170.8	181.2
Net income (billion USD)	7.008	5.653	8.505	5.887	4.786	7.356	11.95	12.87	12.14	19.86	3.944	7.264	18.25	6.224	13.69	13.33	29.85	19.37	13.90
Assets (billion USD)	96.42	95.17	102.0	110.3	145.6	270.6	275.6	265.2	268.3	268.5	270.3	272.3	277.8	292.8	402.7	403.8	444.1	531.9	551.7
Number of employees (thousands)	193.4	175.0	168.0	162.7	190.0	304.2	309.1	302.7	282.7	266.6	256.4	241.8	243.4	243.6	281.5	268.5	254.0	268.2	247.8

== Carbon footprint ==
AT&T reported total CO2e emissions (direct + indirect) for the twelve months ending 31 December 2020 at 5,788 Kt (−737 /-11.3% y-o-y) and plans to reduce emissions by 63% by 2030 from a 2015 base year. This science-based target is aligned with the Paris Agreement to limit global warming to 1.5 °C above pre-industrial levels.

AT&T's annual total CO2e emissions – market-based scope 1 + scope 2 (in kilotonnes)
Dec. 2015	Dec. 2017	Dec. 2018	Dec. 2019	Dec. 2020
8,829	7,801	7,749	6,525	5,788

== Criticism and controversies ==
=== Hemisphere database ===
The company maintains a database of call detail records of all telephone calls that have passed through its network since 1987. AT&T employees work at High Intensity Drug Trafficking Area offices (operated by the Office of National Drug Control Policy) in Los Angeles, Atlanta, and Houston so data can be quickly turned over to law enforcement agencies. Records are requested via an administrative subpoena, without the involvement of a court or grand jury.

=== Censorship ===
In September 2007, AT&T changed its legal policy to state that "AT&T may immediately terminate or suspend all or a portion of your Service, any Member ID, electronic mail address, IP address, Universal Resource Locator or domain name used by you, without notice for conduct that AT&T believes ... (c) tends to damage the name or reputation of AT&T, or its parents, affiliates and subsidiaries." By October 10, 2007, AT&T had altered the terms and conditions for its Internet service to explicitly support freedom of expression by its subscribers, after an outcry claiming the company had given itself the right to censor its subscribers' transmissions.

=== Privacy controversy ===
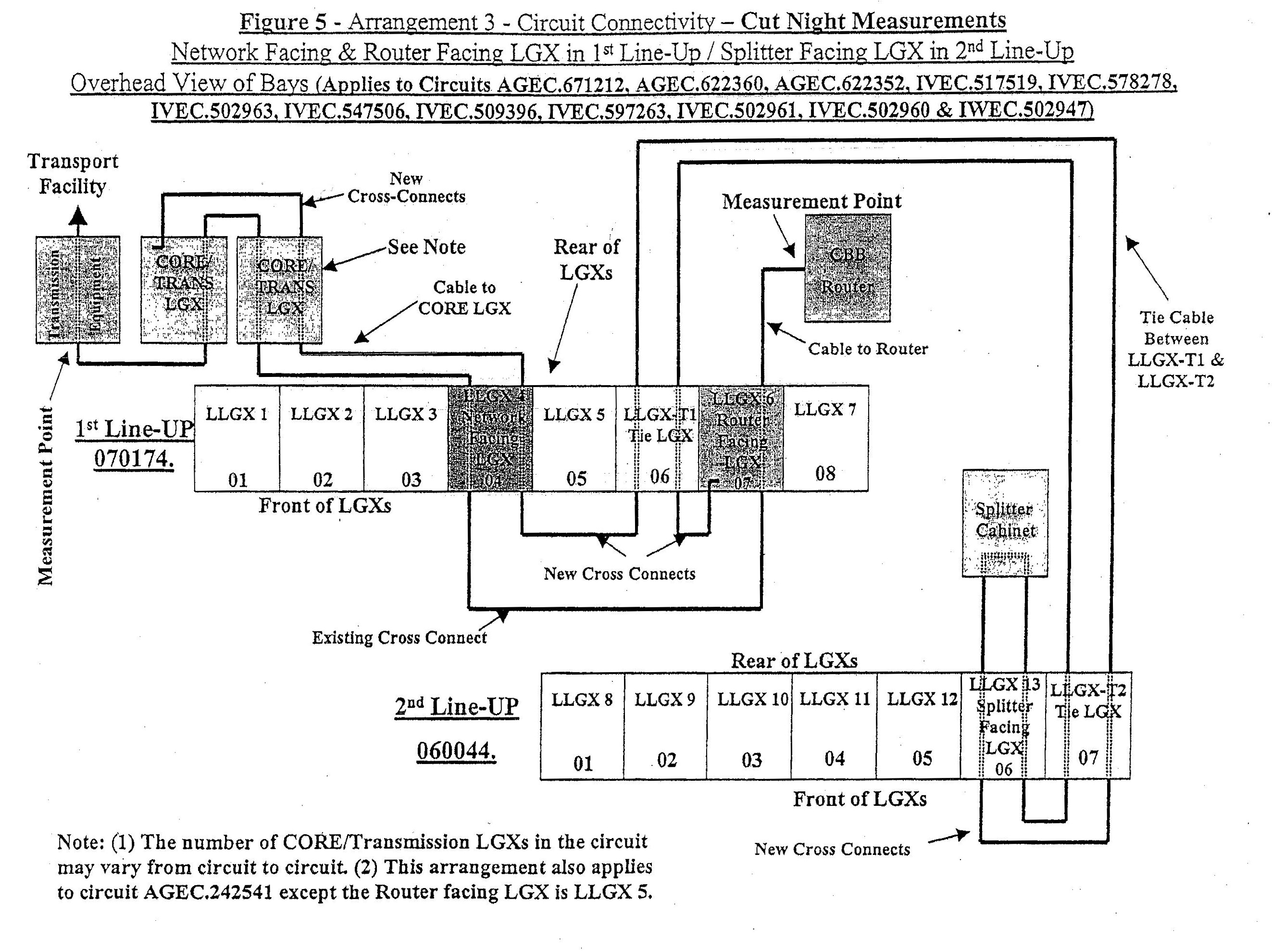
Diagram of how alleged wiretapping worked, from EFF court filings

In 2006, the Electronic Frontier Foundation lodged the class action lawsuit Hepting v. AT&T, which alleged that AT&T had allowed agents of the National Security Agency (NSA) to monitor phone and Internet communications of AT&T customers without warrants. If true, this would violate the Foreign Intelligence Surveillance Act of 1978 and the First and Fourth Amendments of the U.S. Constitution. AT&T has yet to confirm or deny that monitoring by the NSA is occurring. In April 2006, retired former AT&T technician Mark Klein lodged an affidavit supporting this allegation. The US Department of Justice stated it would intervene in this lawsuit by means of State Secrets Privilege.

In July 2006, the United States District Court for the Northern District of California – in which the suit was filed – rejected a federal government motion to dismiss the case. The motion to dismiss, which invoked the State Secrets Privilege, had argued that any court review of the alleged partnership between the federal government and AT&T would harm national security. The case was immediately appealed to the Ninth Circuit. It was dismissed on June 3, 2009, citing retroactive legislation in the Foreign Intelligence Surveillance Act.

In May 2006, USA Today reported that all international and domestic calling records had been handed over to the National Security Agency by AT&T, Verizon, SBC, and BellSouth for the purpose of creating a massive calling database. The portions of the new AT&T that had been part of SBC Communications before November 18, 2005, were not mentioned.

On June 21, 2006, the San Francisco Chronicle reported that AT&T had rewritten rules on its privacy policy. The policy, which took effect June 23, 2006, says that "AT&T – not customers – owns customers' confidential info and can use it 'to protect its legitimate business interests, safeguard others, or respond to legal process.'"

On August 22, 2007, National Intelligence Director Mike McConnell confirmed that AT&T was one of the telecommunications companies that assisted with the government's warrantless wire-tapping program on calls between foreign and domestic sources.

On November 8, 2007, Mark Klein, a former AT&T technician, told Keith Olbermann of MSNBC that all Internet traffic passing over AT&T lines was copied into a locked room at the company's San Francisco office – to which only employees with National Security Agency clearance had access.

AT&T keeps for five to seven years a record of who text messages whom and the date and time, but not the content of the messages.

AT&T has a one star privacy rating from the Electronic Frontier Foundation.

=== Copyright enforcement ===
In January 2008, reports emerged that the company planned to begin filtering all Internet traffic which passed through its network for intellectual property violations. Media commentators speculated that if this plan was implemented, it would have led to a mass exodus of subscribers from AT&T, although Internet traffic of non-subscribers may have gone through the company's network anyway. Internet freedom proponents used these developments as justification for government-mandated network neutrality.

Under AT&T's current copyright enforcement program, content owners may notify AT&T when they allege unlawful sharing of material. The program is based on IP addresses visible to content owners in peer-to-peer networks, not on filtering. AT&T has terminated the broadband service of some customers accused of copyright infringement.

=== Discrimination against local public-access television channels ===
In 2009 AT&T was accused by community media groups of discriminating against local public, educational, and government access (PEG) cable TV channels, by "impictions that will severely restrict the audience".

According to Barbara Popovic, executive director of the Chicago public-access service CAN-TV, the new AT&T U-verse system forced all Public-access television into a special menu system, denying normal functionality such as channel numbers, access to the standard program guide, and DVR recording. The Ratepayer Advocates division of the California Public Utilities Commission reported: "Instead of putting the stations on individual channels, AT&T has bundled community stations into a generic channel that can only be navigated through a complex and lengthy process."

Sue Buske (president of telecommunications consulting firm the Buske Group and a former head of the National Federation of Local Cable Programmers/Alliance for Community Media) argue that this is "an overall attack [...] on public access across the [United States], the place in the dial around cities and communities where people can make their own media in their own communities".

=== Information security ===
In June 2010, a hacker group known as Goatse Security discovered a vulnerability within AT&T that could allow anyone to uncover email addresses belonging to customers of AT&T 3G service for the Apple iPad. These email addresses could be accessed without a protective password. Using a script, Goatse Security collected thousands of email addresses from AT&T. Goatse Security informed AT&T about the security flaw through a third party. Goatse Security then disclosed around 114,000 of these emails to Gawker Media, which published an article about the security flaw and disclosure in Valleywag. Praetorian Security Group criticized the web application that Goatse Security exploited as "poorly designed".

In April 2015, AT&T was fined $25 million over data security breaches, marking the largest ever fine issued by the Federal Communications Commission (FCC) for breaking data privacy laws. The investigation revealed the theft of details of approximately 280,000 people from call centers in Mexico, Colombia and the Philippines.

In March 2024, AT&T confirmed the 2021 leak of contact information for over 7.6 million current users, as well as 65 million former ones. The leaked records may contain "full name, email address, mailing address, phone number, social security number, date of birth, AT&T account number and passcode". Multiple class-action lawsuits have been filed as a result of this.

In July 2024, the company stated it experienced a new breach, the largest to date. The company is expected to notify around 110 million customers who were affected.

=== Accusations of enabling fraud ===
In March 2012, the United States federal government announced a lawsuit against AT&T. The specific accusations state that AT&T "violated the False Claims Act by facilitating and seeking federal payment for IP Relay calls by international callers who were ineligible for the service and sought to use it for fraudulent purposes. The complaint alleges that, out of fears that fraudulent call volume would drop after the registration deadline, AT&T knowingly adopted a non-compliant registration system that did not verify whether the user was located within the United States. The complaint further contends that AT&T continued to employ this system even with the knowledge that it facilitated the use of IP Relay by fraudulent foreign callers, which accounted for up to 95 percent of AT&T's call volume. The government's complaint alleges that AT&T improperly billed the TRS Fund for reimbursement of these calls and received millions of dollars in federal payments as a result." In 2013, AT&T entered into a consent decree with the FCC and paid a total of $21.75 million.

=== Aaron Slator controversy ===
On April 28, 2015, AT&T announced that it had fired Aaron Slator, President of Content and Advertising Sales, for sending text messages critics described as racist. African-American employee Knoyme King filed a $100 million defamation lawsuit against Slator. The day before that, protesters arrived at AT&T's headquarters in Dallas and its satellite offices in Los Angeles as well as at the home of CEO Randall Stephenson to protest alleged systemic racial policies. According to accounts, the protesters demanded that AT&T begin working with 100% black-owned media companies.

On January 24, 2017, Slator sued AT&T in the Los Angeles Superior Court, accusing the company of defamation and wrongful termination. Slator had been involved in organizing AT&T's planned $48.5 billion acquisition of DirecTV since 2014, and he claimed that when news headlines speculated that his text messages could prevent the acquisition from going through, he was fired as a "scapegoat" by company executives. He also claimed that the executives had known about the text messages since at least late 2013, and had promised him at the time that he would not be fired for them. The company stood by its decision to terminate Slator.

=== Overcharging government agencies ===
In 2020 AT&T paid out $48 million to settle a lawsuit with 30 government entities. The suit (under the California False Claims Act) related to contractual undertakings to provide services at "the lowest cost available". AT&T denied any wrongdoing in the matter.

=== One America News Network ===
An investigative report by Reuters in 2021 revealed that AT&T played a key role in creating, funding and sustaining One America News Network (OAN), a far-right TV network known for promoting conspiracy theories. According to 2020 sworn testimony by an OAN accountant, 90% of OAN's revenue came from AT&T. According to OAN founder Robert Herring Sr., AT&T wanted to create a conservative network to compete with Fox News. Court documents showed OAN promised to "cast a positive light" on AT&T during newscasts. AT&T denied the allegations. NAACP president Derrick Johnson and comedian John Oliver criticized AT&T for funding OAN.

=== Leaking data to Wall Street ===
In March 2021 the U.S. Securities and Exchange Commission (SEC) filed suit against AT&T and three of its executives for violating the Fair Disclosure Rule against making selective disclosures of "material nonpublic information" to analysts and others. The SEC alleged that beginning in early 2016 these executives leaked key information to Wall Street analysts to manipulate revenue forecasts for the company.

In December 2022, without acknowledging any guilt, AT&T agreed to pay $6.25 million in fines to settle the lawsuit. The individual executives were also on the hook for $25,000 each.

=== Bribery to influence legislation ===
In October 2022, AT&T agreed to pay a $23 million fine to resolve a federal criminal investigation into the company's efforts to unlawfully influence former Illinois Speaker of the House Michael J. Madigan. Under a deferred prosecution with the US Department of Justice, AT&T admitted that it arranged for payments to an ally of Madigan to influence Madigan's vote in 2017 on legislation that would eliminate AT&T's so-called "Carrier of Last Resort" obligation to provide landline telephone service to all Illinois residents, which was expected to save the company millions of dollars. Madigan also helped to defeat an amendment to a bill that became law in 2018 regarding fees for small cell tower attachments that would have been harmful to AT&T's interests. Former AT&T Illinois President Paul La Schiazza, who is set to go on trial in September 2024 for the alleged bribery scheme, described AT&T's quid pro quo relationship with Madigan in an email to an AT&T employee as "the friends and family plan".

=== 2024 outage ===
On February 22, 2024, cellular service was disrupted across the United States with "millions" unable to connect to the cellular network. Municipalities reported that AT&T customers were unable to place calls to emergency services, even when using their phone's SOS capability. The blackout prompted the FBI and Department of Homeland Security to launch investigations into the possibility of a cyber attack being the cause of the blackout. AT&T later claimed that the cause was instead a poorly timed server update. Users were later compensated credit as a result of the outage. In March, the FCC opened an investigation into the outage.

2024 Data Breach Fine

On September 18, 2024, AT&T was fined $13 million by the Federal Trade Commission (FTC) following a major data breach that exposed millions of customers' personal information. The FTC found that AT&T failed to implement adequate cybersecurity measures and did not promptly notify affected individuals. As part of the settlement, AT&T is required to enhance its data protection practices and provide identity theft protection to those impacted.

== Naming rights and sponsorships ==
=== Buildings ===
- Whitacre Tower (One AT&T Plaza) – corporate headquarters, Dallas, Texas
- AT&T 220 Building – building in Indianapolis, Indiana
- AT&T Building – building in Detroit, Michigan
- AT&T Building – building in Indianapolis, Indiana
- AT&T Building – building in Kingman, Arizona
- AT&T Building – (aka "The Batman Building") in Nashville, Tennessee
- AT&T Building – building in Omaha, Nebraska
- AT&T Building Addition – building in Detroit, Michigan
- AT&T Building – building in San Diego
- AT&T Center – building in Los Angeles
- AT&T Center – building in St. Louis, Missouri
- AT&T City Center – building in Birmingham, Alabama
- AT&T Corporate Center – building in Chicago, Illinois
- AT&T Huron Road Building – skyscraper in Cleveland, Ohio
- AT&T Lenox Park Campus – AT&T Mobility Headquarters in DeKalb County just outside Atlanta, Georgia
- AT&T Midtown Center – building in Atlanta, Georgia
- AT&T Switching Center – building in Los Angeles
- AT&T Switching Center – building in Oakland, California
- AT&T Switching Center – building in San Francisco
- AT&T Tower – building in Minneapolis, Minnesota
- AT&T Building – building in Meriden, Connecticut
- AT&T Entertainment Group HQ – DirecTV corporate campus in El Segundo, California

=== Venues ===
- AT&T Field – Chattanooga, Tennessee (formerly BellSouth Park)
- AT&T Plaza – Chicago, Illinois (public space that hosts the Cloud Gate sculpture in Millennium Park)
- AT&T Performing Arts Center – Dallas, Texas
- AT&T Stadium – Arlington, Texas (formerly Cowboys Stadium)
- AT&T Stadium – Glen Jean, West Virginia (outdoor open-seating stadium at the Boy Scouts of America's Summit Bechtel Reserve)
- Jones AT&T Stadium – Lubbock, Texas (formerly Clifford B. and Audrey Jones Stadium, Jones SBC Stadium)

=== Sponsorships ===
- 100 Thieves (esports)
- AT&T Byron Nelson – Irving, Texas (golf)
- AT&T Pebble Beach National Pro-Am (golf)
- Capitanes de la Ciudad de México (basketball)
- Chicago Bulls (basketball)
- College Football Playoff National Championship
- Dallas Stars (ice hockey)
- 2026 FIFA World Cup
- Houston Rockets (basketball)
- Major League Soccer and the United States Soccer Federation, including the U.S. men's and U.S. women's national teams and the Major League Soccer All-Star Game from 2009
- Mexico national football team
- National Collegiate Athletic Association (Corporate Champion)
- National Basketball Association, Women's National Basketball Association, NBA G League, USA Basketball and NBA 2K League (basketball, esports)
- BMW Sauber (Formula One racing team) – 2005
- Scuderia Ferrari (Formula One racing team) – 2005
- Williams Racing (Formula One racing team) – 2007 to 2011
- Richard Childress Racing #31 car (NASCAR) – 2007 to 2008
- Red Bull Racing (Formula One racing team) – technical support and sponsorship, 2011 to 2020
- Cloud9, sponsorship since March 2019
- Club América – sponsorship since July 19, 2018

== See also ==
- List of public corporations by market capitalization
- List of largest companies by revenue
- List of United States telephone companies
- List of mobile network operators
- List of mobile network operators in the United States
- List of telecommunications companies
- List of Internet exchange points
- List of public utilities
- Bell System
  - Breakup of the Bell System
    - United States v. AT&T
    - Modification of Final Judgment
- Communications Assistance for Law Enforcement Act
- NSA warrantless surveillance
  - MAINWAY
  - Hepting v. AT&T
    - Mark Klein
    - Room 641A
- Pat Fleet
