= MediaOne =

American cable television company

Comcast MO Group, Inc.
- Type: Subsidiary
- Industry: Cable television
- Predecessor: US West then American Telephone and Telegraph Company as AT&T Broadband
- Founded: 1998; 28 years ago
- Defunct: 2003; 23 years ago
- Fate: Merged with Comcast
- Successor: Comcast Corporation
- Headquarters: United States
- Parent: Comcast Corporation

Comcast MO Group, Inc. (formerly MediaOne Group, Inc.) is a telecommunications company created by US West Inc. in 1998 following US West's acquisition of Boston-based Continental Cablevision. The company combined Continental with Wometco/GCT, which US West had previously acquired. Wometco/GCT had adopted the MediaOne name a year earlier. Media One Group was acquired in 2000 by AT&T Broadband, which was subsequently acquired by Comcast in 2002.

== History ==
US West Inc. was a regional holding company formed from the combination of three Bell Operating Companies: The Mountain States Telephone and Telegraph Company (or Mountain Bell, based in Denver, Colorado); Northwestern Bell, based in Omaha, Nebraska; and Pacific Northwest Bell, based in Seattle, Washington. On January 1, 1991, Northwestern Bell and Pacific Northwest Bell were legally merged into Mountain Bell, which was renamed US West Communications, Inc.

=== Expansion into cable ===
US West Media Group logo, 1995–1998

In order to segregate its regulated telephone service from its unregulated cable TV businesses, US West Inc separated their assets and businesses into two groups named US West Communications Group and US West Media Group and issued separate tracking shares for each company. These tracking shares reflected results and prospects of the group's business, and would be traded separately. The Media Group's ticker symbol was "UMG" while the Communications group continued with the "USW" ticker.

In 1995, the cable modem service was later renamed to MediaOne Express. The company completed a co-branding deal with Time Warner's cable modem Internet business under which MediaOne would become MediaOne RoadRunner.

==== Acquisitions ====
In 1996, US West acquired Continental Cablevision for $5.3 billion in stock and renamed it MediaOne (initially named Media1). Amos B. Hostetter, Jr., a founder and former chairman and CEO of Continental resigned after US West moved the company's headquarters from Boston, Massachusetts.

In time the service also included pay-per-view, and a self-branded high-speed cable modem internet service named Hiway1 (Highway One). Hiway1 was an early provider of the cable modem technology. Most early-period modems for the service were created by the manufacturer LANcity (Bay Networks).

=== Name change ===
In 1998, US West Inc spun off its telephone and non-telephone assets into two separate companies. US West, Inc., changed its name to MediaOne Group, Inc. and the US West Communications Group and directory publishing division US West Dex were transferred to a new entity that took the US West, Inc. name. The "new" US West was then spun off to shareholders of Communications Group stock. The split became effective June 12, 1998. Chuck Lillis became CEO of MediaOne Group.

=== Acquisition by AT&T ===
In 1999, Comcast first made a bid for MediaOne. Comcast said they would pay $60 billion and assume all of MediaOne's debt. On May 6, 1999, AT&T, not wanting to be outdone promised about $62 billion instead, and paid a break up fee of $1.5 billion allowing MediaOne to be purchased by AT&T.

MediaOne RoadRunner et al. next became AT&T branded. The portion which ran television was "AT&T Cable Television", another part for Internet became known as "AT&T Broadband Internet" and the third became "AT&T Digital Phone". The buyout of MediaOne by AT&T happened close on the heels of AT&T's purchase of cable company TCI. That buyout by TCI already made AT&T the largest cable company, and MediaOne only served to increase their margin of leadership.

In the summer of 2000, AT&T Broadband purchased the cable television system serving the city of Boston, then controlled by New York-based Cablevision, for $1.1 billion in stock, cash and a trade of other cable systems. The deal effectively made the Boston/New England region MediaOne's largest clustered market. In exchange for the Boston system, Cablevision also received several of AT&T Broadband's systems which served suburban New York communities.

AT&T was unable to make the merger work for many reasons, and split the company into three separate companies: AT&T Corp. continued and retained its long-distance business, AT&T Wireless Services was spun off as a public company, and AT&T Broadband was purchased by Comcast. At this point, MediaOne became known as Comcast MO Group, Inc.

=== Criticisms ===
Many customers criticized AT&T over the transitioning from Mediaone.net to attbroadband.com and subsequently attbi.com email addresses. A final subsequent change from attbi.com to Comcast.net also drew further criticism from the company's longest customers who may have gone through the several prior email changes.

== Markets ==
The main markets & regions for MediaOne were:

- "MediaOne Atlanta"—Atlanta, Fayetteville (Georgia)
- "MediaOne Chicago"—Chicago market (Illinois)
- "MediaOne Denver"—Denver (Colorado) (Note: While MediaOne was at one point a very large employer in Denver, they never actually sold any services here despite this being the location of MediaOne Labs)
- "MediaOne Florida"—Jacksonville, Miami (Southeast/Southwest Florida)
- "MediaOne Midwest"—Metro Detroit/Ann Arbor, Erie Shore Region of Ohio (Toledo, Port Clinton, Fremont, Sandusky and Cleveland areas) (Michigan, Ohio)
- "MediaOne Minnesota"—Twin Cities (Minnesota)
- "MediaOne New England"—Boston (East/West Massachusetts, New Hampshire)
- "MediaOne West"—Bakersfield, Fresno, Los Angeles, Mendota, Stockton (California)

Besides the United States, MediaOne Group also had several smaller business operations in headed by CEO Ron Timmons:

- Belgium
- Czech Republic
- Hungary
- India
- Indonesia
- Japan
- Malaysia
- The Netherlands
- Poland
- Russia
- Singapore
- Slovakia
- United Kingdom

Almost all of MediaOne's international holdings were sold off to satisfy regulators for the merger with AT&T.

== See also ==
- CenturyLink
- Qwest
