= HTC Titan (Windows Mobile phone) =

Smartphone running Windows Mobile 6.1 Pocket PC

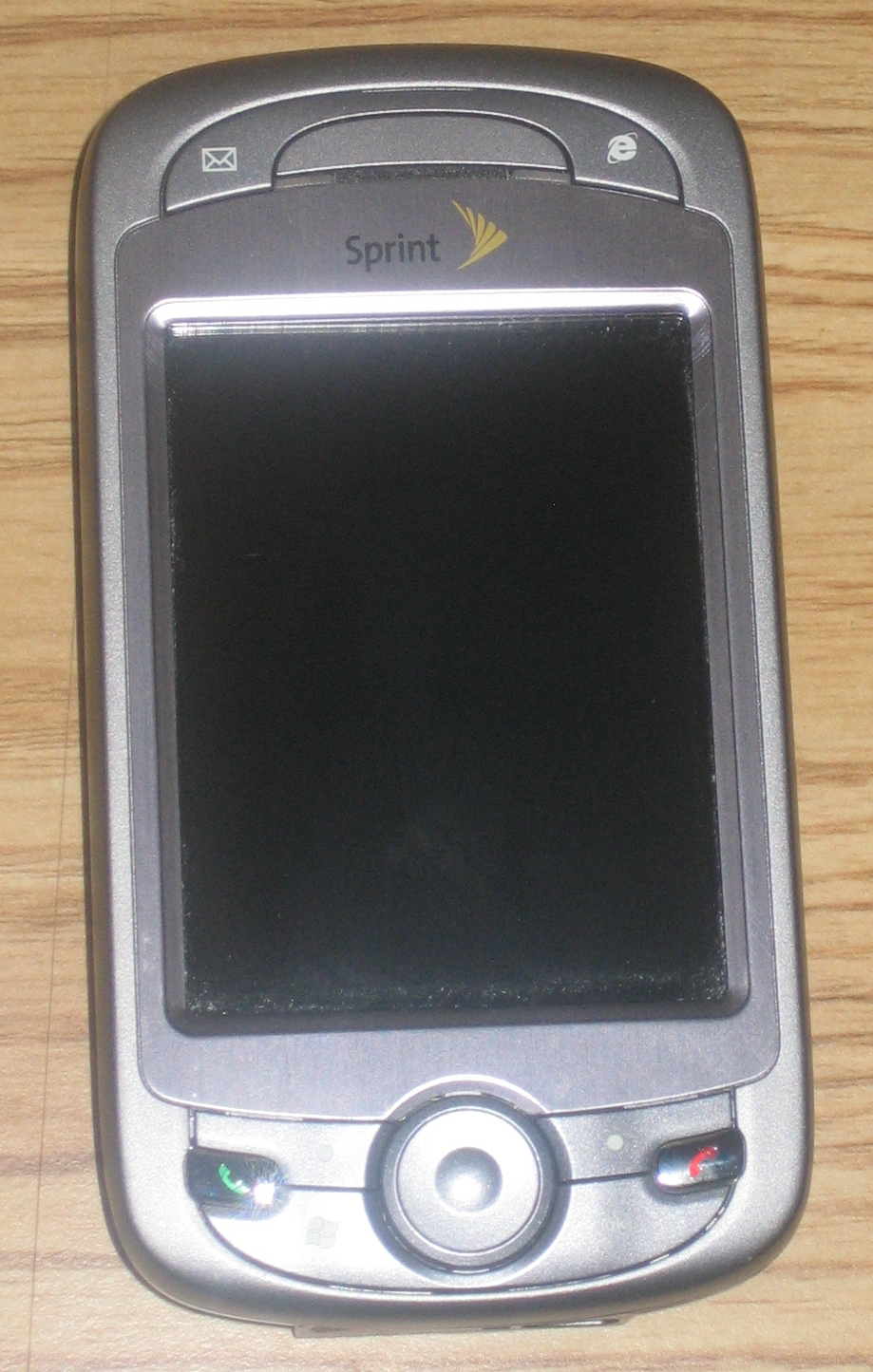
- Manufacturers: High Tech Computer Corporation; Alltel, Qwest Wireless; Sprint; Verizon Wireless; Bell Mobility; Telus
- Availability by region: June 2007
- Predecessor: HTC Apache
- Successor: HTC TyTN II
- Compatible networks: CDMA; 1× RTT; 1× EV-DO Rev. A; aGPS
- Form factor: PDA, Smartphone
- Dimensions: 110 mm × 59 mm × 18.5 mm (4.33 in × 2.32 in × 0.73 in)
- Weight: 164 g (5.8 oz)
- Operating system: Windows Mobile 6.0
- CPU: Qualcomm MSM7500 ARM Processor at 400 MHz
- Memory: 64 MB RAM; 256 MB ROM
- Removable storage: microSDHC, up to 32 GB
- Battery: 1500 mAh Lithium-ion polymer battery, user accessible
- Rear camera: 2.0 megapixel
- Display: 240 × 320 px; 2.8 in (71 mm); 65536 color LCD; 3:4 aspect ratio
- Connectivity: Bluetooth 2.0; WiFi; Infrared; USB 1.1 / HTC ExtUSB
- Data inputs: QWERTY Keyboard and Touchscreen

The HTC Titan is a Windows Mobile 6.1 Pocket PC personal digital assistant (PDA) and phone manufactured by High Tech Computer Corporation of Taiwan. It is the successor to the HTC Apache upon which it improves by adding more ROM, GPS, EVDO Rev. A, additional hard keys, a scroll-wheel, spring-loaded keyboard, and a higher resolution camera. The Windows Mobile 6.1 operating system includes Office Mobile along with HTML email through Microsoft Outlook Mobile. Windows Media Player is included, allowing the Titan to act as a digital audio and digital movie player.

== ROM updates ==
On August 27, 2008, HTC released a ROM update adding Windows Mobile 6.1 to the XV6800 (Verizon Wireless) variant of the device. However, this release blocks A-GPS access to all but applications which have been digitally signed by Verizon Wireless. Currently this is only VZ Navigator. Verizon has said that they will digitally sign other applications, and hackers have released a software patch which bypasses the limitation.

On July 21, 2008, HTC released a ROM update for the Sprint Mogul, which added Windows Mobile 6.1 to the device. It also added Sprint TV service.

On March 10, 2008, HTC released a ROM update for the Sprint Mogul which enables EVDO Rev. A and AGPS functionality. The ROM update also adds a task manager and corrects bugs in the phone's Bluetooth implementation and Windows Live Messenger.

A ROM update for the Telus HTC P4000, dated July 27, 2007, is available. The shipping ROM is available from HTC.

Several ROM updates are available from UTStarcom, including one for the Sprint Mogul dated July 16, 2007 and the shipping ROM for the Bell HTC 6800.

Any ROM update will return the phone to a factory state, so users should back up all data before upgrading and updating.

== Versions ==
Carriers/Models include:

- Alltel HTC PPC6800
- Bell HTC 6800
- Qwest Mogul by HTC
- Sprint Mogul by HTC
- Telus HTC P4000
- US Cellular HTC PPC6800
- Verizon Wireless HTC XV6800
- Telecom New Zealand HTC Titan (Ships running Windows Mobile 5)
- nTelos Wireless HTC 6800

== GPS compatibility ==
Users of this phone have successfully installed and used other GPS map software applications (such as Tracky, iGuidance, TomTom, Fugawi, Garmin Mobile XT, CoPilot Live, Google Maps, and Microsoft's Live Search for Windows Mobile), which do not charge a service fee. The map applications are compatible with the built-in GPS receiver, provided users set the appropriate COM port for the map application. The built-in GPS receiver was intended by some wireless providers to be used preferably with Telenav, which is a service that charges users monthly fees or fees based on the amount of downloaded map data. Telenav can only provide map data in areas where applicable cellular phone services are available and that users must have a data plan with their wireless providers.

The GPS may not activate when the phone is used indoors (or without access to clear sky) or if the person is walking very slowly (< 1 mile/hour). External GPS antenna connection provision is provided for clear signal reception. Its important for the GPS to be activated for the various functions in the GPS software to be activated and used properly.
