= Wells Fargo Center (Denver) =

Skyscraper in Denver, Colorado

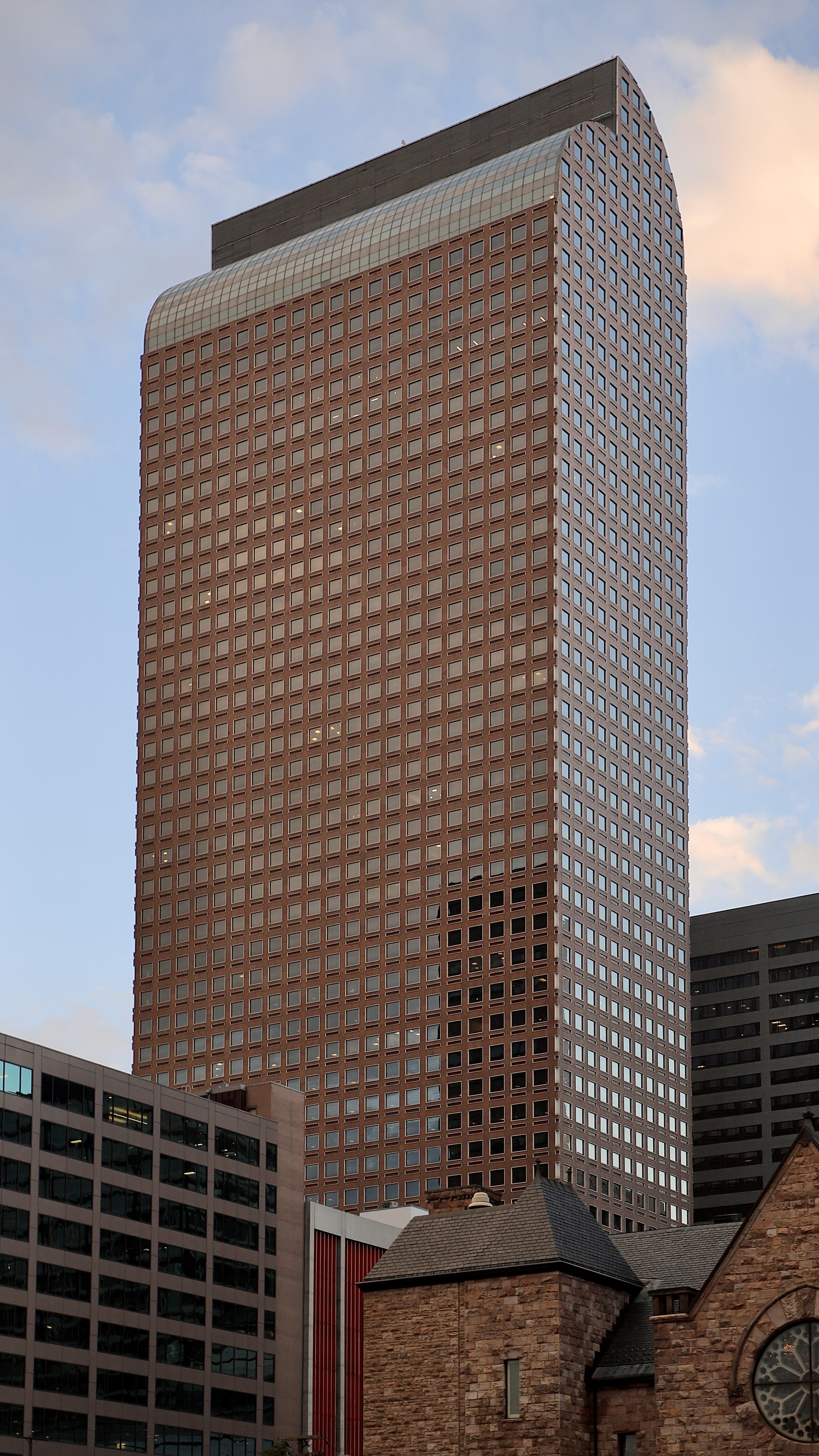
- Wells Fargo Center in 2024
- Interactive map of the Wells Fargo Center area
- Former names: One Norwest Center

General information
- Type: Office
- Location: 1700 Lincoln Street, Denver, Colorado
- Coordinates: 39°44′41″N 104°59′05″W
- Completed: 1983

Height
- Roof: 698 feet (213 m)

Technical details
- Floor count: 52
- Floor area: 110,592 m^{2} (1,190,400 ft^{2})

Design and construction
- Architect: Philip Johnson

Website
- www.brookfieldproperties.com/en/our-properties/wells-fargo-center-603.html

Wells Fargo Center (formerly One Norwest Center) is a skyscraper in Denver, Colorado, United States. The building is known colloquially as the Cash Register Building for the way its uppermost floors curve together resembling the shape of an antique cash register. At 52 stories tall, it is 698 feet (213 m) high and the third tallest building in Denver. It is shorter than the Republic Plaza building at 714 feet (218 m), and 1801 California Street at 709 feet (216 m).

The building was designed by architect Philip Johnson, under a master plan by I. M. Pei, and was completed in 1983. As it was originally designed to be for a downtown area in Texas, a heated roof is necessary to prevent snow from accumulating and sliding dangerously off the curved crown. Located at 1700 Lincoln Street, a skybridge over Lincoln Street connects the Wells Fargo Center to the older Mile High Center at 1700 Broadway; which also housed retail and offices branch of Wells Fargo Bank until they sold them to Beacon Capital Partners in 2020. Both buildings have large atria constructed in the same cash register style. The building has its own ZIP code, 80274.

Beacon Capital Partners bought the building from Maguire Properties Denver in 2012 for $387.5 million. Beacon undertook a three-year renovation of the lobby which was completed in 2016. As part of the renovation, experience design firm ESI Design created an 8-story digital art installation in the building's glass atrium and added new furniture and lighting. Enoc Perez, an artist from New York, was commissioned to create 14 paintings and 5 sculptures for the site. Brookfield Properties acquired an ownership stake in the building in 2020. Wells Fargo Center's value declined by 35% after several major tenants left during the COVID-19 pandemic. After a $280 million mortgage loan on the building went into default, Judy Duran was appointed as the building's receiver in August 2023; the lenders subsequently extended the loan.

== Gallery ==
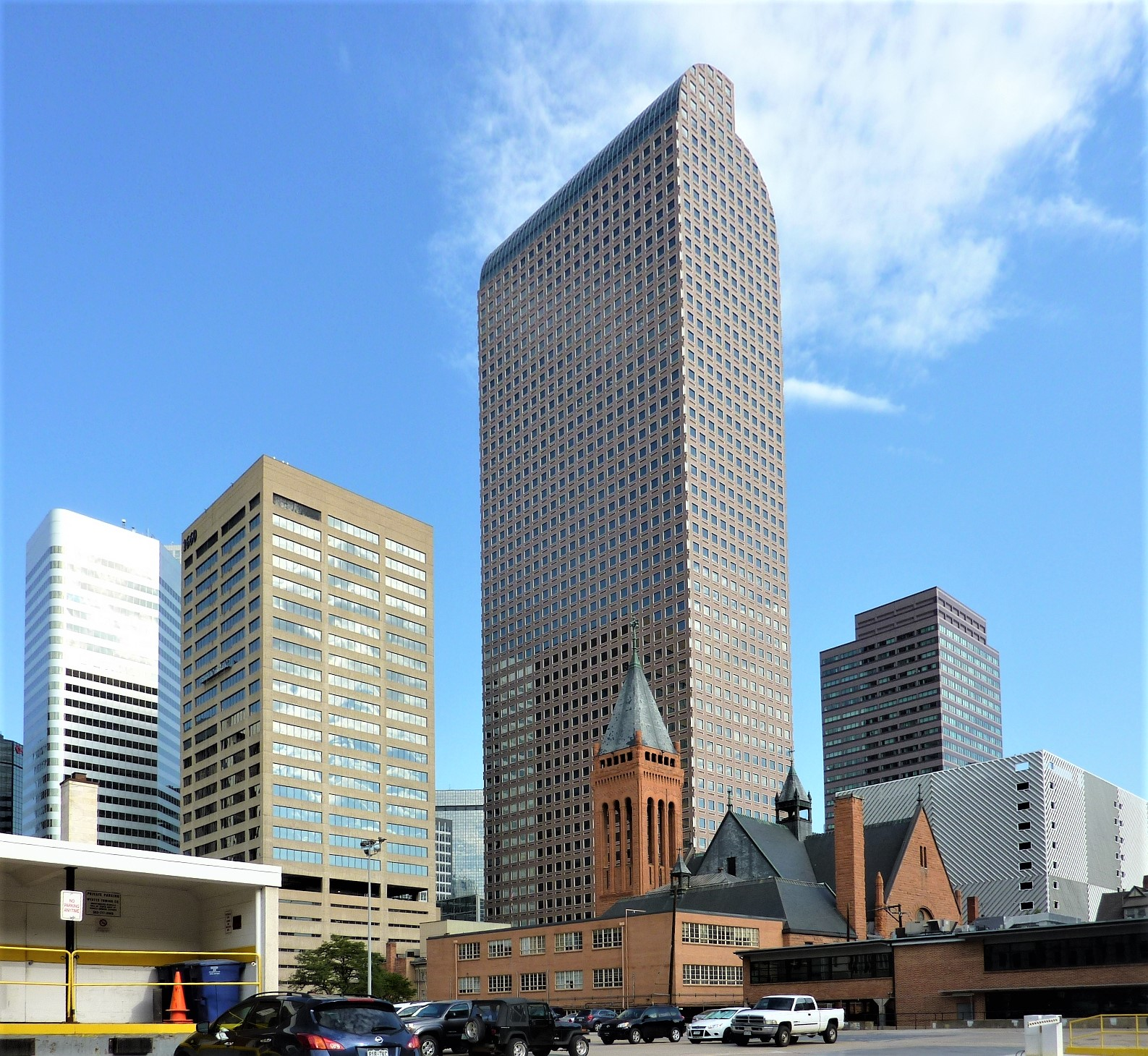
Wells Fargo Center

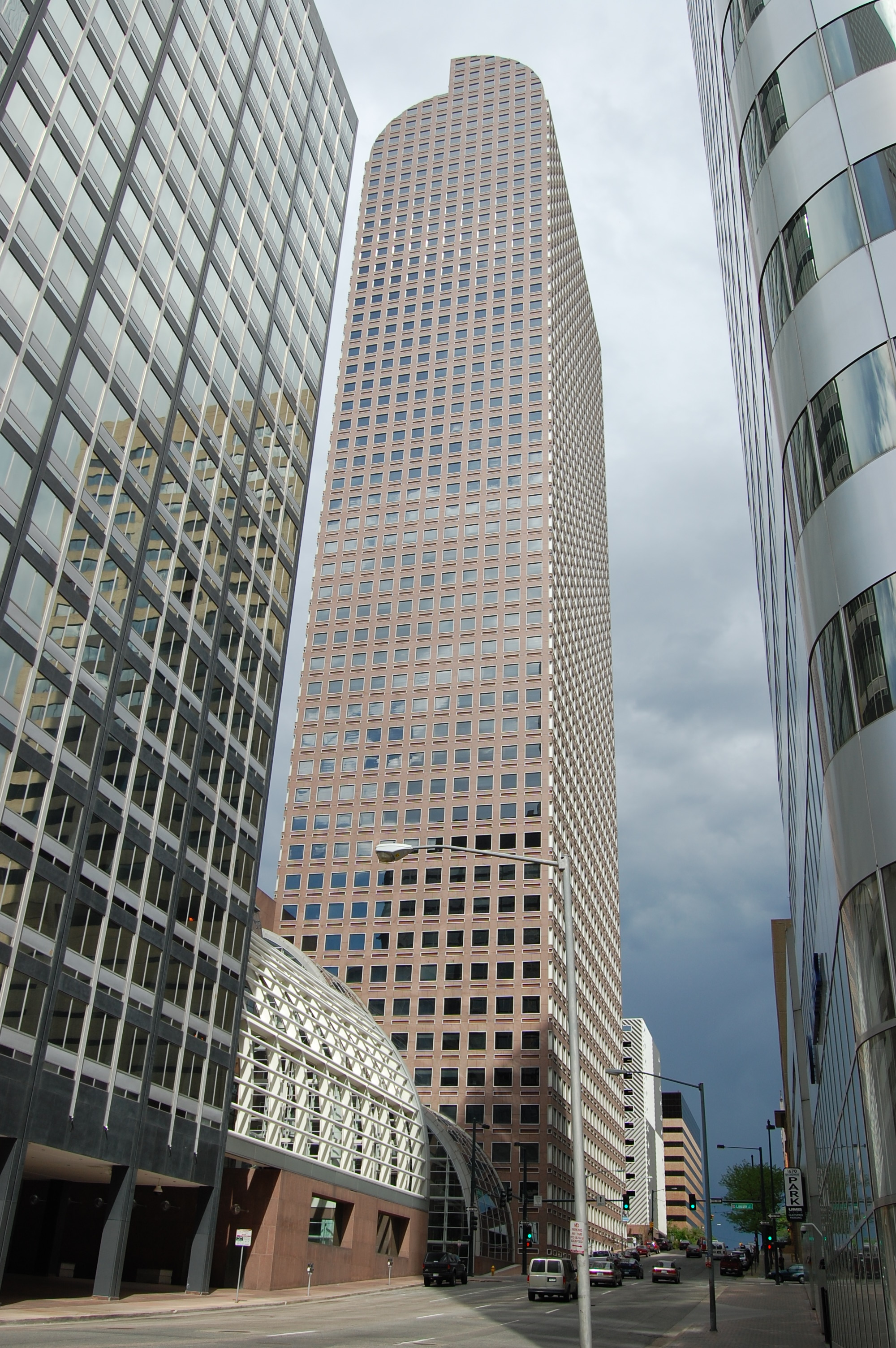

Under final phases of construction c.1982

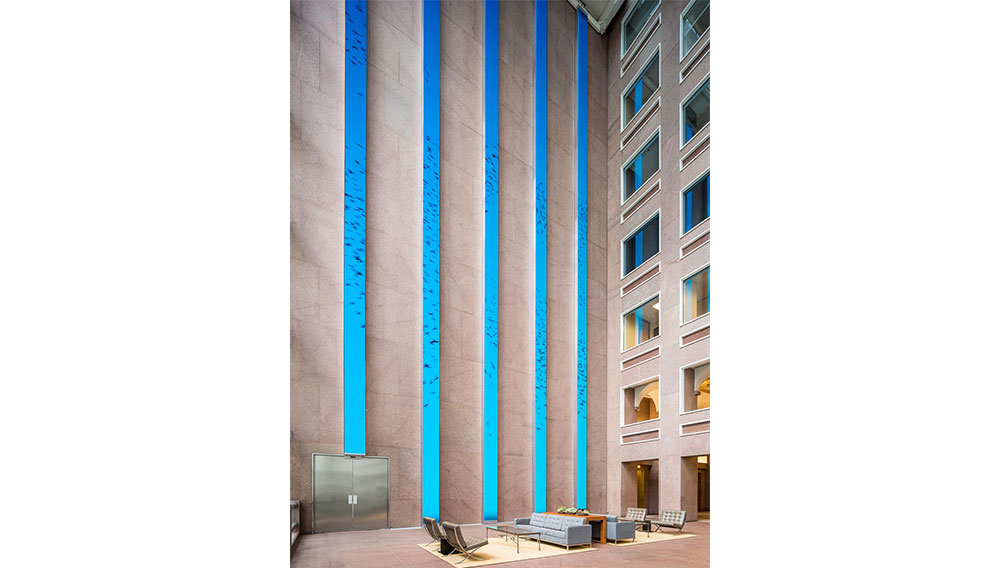
Wells Fargo digital art installation by ESI Design featuring a flock of birds animated in real-time
