= Malheur Bell =

Malheur Home Telephone Company
- Type: Subsidiary
- Industry: Telecommunications
- Founded: 1895; 131 years ago
- Defunct: 2009
- Fate: Merged
- Successor: Qwest
- Headquarters: Ontario, Oregon, United States
- Products: Local Telephone Service
- Parent: Rocky Mountain Bell (1899–1911); MST&T/US West/Qwest (1911–2009)

Malheur Home Telephone Company, commonly known as Malheur Bell, was a rural telephone company operating in Oregon. It was a wholly owned subsidiary of Qwest Corporation, the Bell Operating Company of Qwest Communications International.

== History ==
The original local ancestor of Malheur Bell, and the first telephone company in Malheur County, was the Malheur Telephone Company, opening in 1895 in Vale, Oregon, then located in Sunset Telephone and Telegraph territory. Another company, Rocky Mountain Bell provided a toll line to the exchange in 1898 as part of a line between Boise, Idaho and Weiser, Idaho, and opened its own local telephone exchanges along the line in Ontario, Oregon in 1900 and Nyssa, Oregon in 1903.

However, the Independent Long Distance Telephone Company of Idaho opened another toll line in the area in 1907, and two local phone companies associated with it were soon formed: the Ontario Independent Telephone Company in 1909, and the Nyssa Owyhee Independent Telephone Company in 1910. That system competed directly with Rocky Mountain Bell and its connected local phone companies in the same towns.

The Malheur Home Telephone Company was incorporated in 1910 and set about purchasing the telephone systems in the area, starting with Malheur Telephone in Vale and Rocky Mountain Bell, with its Bell franchise, in Nyssa and Ontario. In 1911 it bought the Oregon portion of the toll lines of both Rocky Mountain Bell and Independent Long Distance Telephone Company of Idaho, also taking the Ontario Independent Telephone Company in 1911 and Nyssa Owyhee in 1912.

Rocky Mountain Bell received so much Malheur Home Telephone Company stock in exchange for Rocky Mountain Bell property that Rocky Mountain Bell obtained controlling interest of Malheur. This controlling interest was carried through the later merger of Rocky Mountain Bell with other telephone companies into the Mountain States Telephone and Telegraph Company. Over time Mountain States Telephone also bought out the minority shareholders of Malheur, eventually becoming the sole owner of Malheur. Malheur continued to remain an independent operation of Mountain States Telephone. Malheur Bell was located in a state otherwise served by Pacific Telephone & Telegraph.

By 1984, Mountain Bell had acquired 100% of the company's stock, and Malheur continued to operate independently of Mountain Bell. At this point it was located within Pacific Northwest Bell territory, split from Pacific Telephone in the 1960s. PNB became a sister Bell Operating Company of Mountain Bell under US West ownership in 1984. In 1991, US West merged its operating companies into Mountain Bell, which was renamed US West Communications; however, Malheur Bell remained independent of the rest of US West operations, and continued to use the Bell trademark.

In 2000, US West was acquired by Qwest, and US West Communications was renamed Qwest Corporation. Malheur Bell continued to operate independently of its parent until its operations were fully integrated into Qwest on December 14, 2009.
