= R. Donnelley =

R. Donnelley may refer to:

- RR Donnelley, publishing company founded 1864
- R. H. Donnelley, publishing company founded 1886 and succeeded by Dex One
