= El Paso County Telephone =

The El Paso County Telephone Company
- Trade name: CenturyLink
- Company type: Subsidiary
- Traded as: CenturyLink
- Industry: Telecommunications
- Founded: 1915; 111 years ago
- Headquarters: Colorado Springs, Colorado, United States
- Products: POTS, DSL
- Parent: U S WEST/Qwest (1985-present)
- Website: www.elpasotel.com

The El Paso County Telephone Company is a small telephone company based in Colorado Springs, Colorado and owned by Qwest Corporation, a subsidiary of Lumen Technologies.

It was founded in 1915 as El Paso County Mutual Telephone Company. In 1975, the company changed its name to The El Paso County Telephone Company. In 1985, the company was acquired by US West, the dominant telephone company in the rest of Colorado. In 2000, Qwest acquired US West; however, El Paso County Telephone remained unchanged.

In 2011, CenturyLink acquired Qwest. El Paso County Telephone remains a subsidiary owned by Qwest Corporation with independent management. The company serves an 1,100 square mile area in eastern El Paso County, Colorado, as well as portions of Elbert, Lincoln, and Pueblo counties in Colorado

On June 10, 2013, El Paso County Telephone began doing business as CenturyLink.
