= Joseph Nacchio =

American executive (born 1949)

Joseph P. Nacchio (born June 22, 1949, in Brooklyn, New York) is an American executive who was chairman of the board and chief executive officer of Qwest Communications International from 1997 to 2002. Nacchio was convicted of insider trading during his time heading Qwest. He claimed in court, with documentation, that his was the only company to demand legal authority for surreptitious mass surveillance demanded by the NSA which began prior to the 11 September 2001 attacks.

He was convicted of 19 counts of insider trading in Qwest stock on April 19, 2007 — charges his defense team claimed were U.S. government retaliation for his refusal to give customer data to the National Security Agency in February 2001. This defense was not admissible in court because the U.S. Department of Justice filed an in limine motion, which is often used in national security cases, to exclude information which may reveal state secrets. Information from the Classified Information Procedures Act hearings in Nacchio's case was likewise ruled inadmissible.

On July 27, 2007, he was sentenced to six years in federal prison, and after appeals failed he reported to Federal Correctional Institution, Schuylkill in Schuylkill County, Pennsylvania on April 14, 2009, to serve his sentence. Nacchio finished serving his sentence on September 20, 2013.

== Early life ==
He is the son of a New York City longshoreman and bartender and graduated in 1970 from New York University with a B.S. in Electrical Engineering. Later he earned an MBA from New York University and a Master's degree in management (SM) as a Sloan Fellow from the MIT Sloan School of Management in 1986.

== Career ==
=== Qwest ===
Nacchio joined Qwest in 1997 from AT&T Corporation.

While Chairman, Nacchio was serving on two federal advisory panels—the Network Reliability and Interoperability Council and the National Security Telecommunications Advisory Committee. He was chairman of the latter and was given a top secret security clearance in the late 1990s.

In 2000, during Nacchio's tenure as Qwest CEO, the company acquired its regional rival US West. In 2002, Qwest admitted to false accounting during the time of the merger.

Joseph P. Nacchio was the only head of a communications company to demand a court order, or approval under the Foreign Intelligence Surveillance Act, in order to turn over communications records to the NSA.

According to a The Washington Post report, Nacchio claimed that the National Security Agency had asked Qwest in February 2001 to participate in a surveillance program; Nacchio said that after he declined, the NSA punished Qwest by dropping a contract worth hundreds of millions of dollars.

Nacchio had been selling his Qwest stock as early as January.

Qwest stock began a sharp decline in May 2001, falling from $38 to below $2 by August 2002. Nacchio resigned from Qwest in June 2002 and was replaced by former Ameritech CEO Richard Notebaert.

=== Insider trading, fraud ===
On March 15, 2005, Nacchio and six other former Qwest executives were sued by the U.S. Securities and Exchange Commission. They were accused of a $3 billion financial fraud between 1999 and 2002 and of benefiting from an inflated stock price.

In its case, the government stated that Nacchio continued to tell Wall Street that Qwest would be able to achieve aggressive revenue targets long after he knew that they could not be achieved. This helped it buy up regional phone rival US West, the government alleged. For his part, Nacchio maintained that he believed Qwest would soon be receiving several large government contracts. On November 21, 2005, The Wall Street Journal reported that Nacchio "believed Qwest was doing well because it was getting lucrative secret national-security-related work from the federal government." Nacchio claimed that he was not in a rightful state of mind when he sold his shares because of problems with his son, and the imminent announcement of a number of government contracts.

Nacchio was indicted on December 20, 2005, on insider trading charges in Denver, Colorado. He was forced to surrender his passport for fear that he would flee the country. The indictment against Nacchio charged him with 42 counts of insider trading. Each count carries a potential 10-year jail term and corresponds to a sale of Qwest shares, including a flurry in April–May 2001, when Nacchio sold almost $39 million in stock. At the time, Qwest was trading between $41.12 and $38.31.

Nacchio was convicted on 19 of the 42 counts of insider trading on April 19, 2007. He was released on a $2 million bond. On July 27, 2007, Nacchio was sentenced to six years in federal prison. Federal Judge Edward Nottingham also ordered Nacchio to pay a $19 million fine and forfeit $52 million he gained in illegal stock sales. On March 17, 2008, the U.S. Court of Appeals for the Tenth Circuit overturned his conviction on the basis of defense expert witness testimony that was improperly excluded, and ordered a new trial before a different trial judge. Herbert J. Stern led Nacchio's defense team during the initial trial, while Maureen Mahoney was lead defense attorney during the appeal. On February 25, 2009, the full Tenth Circuit reversed the three-judge panel and reinstated the conviction and sentence.

Nacchio surrendered April 14, 2009, to a federal prison camp in Schuylkill, Pennsylvania, to begin serving a six-year sentence for the insider trading conviction. The United States Supreme Court denied bail pending appeal the same day. His federal register number is 33973–013.

On October 5, 2009, the US Supreme Court denied certiorari.

Nacchio finished serving his sentence on September 20, 2013.

== See also ==
- MAINWAY
