= Dex One =

American yellow pages and marketing company

Dex One Corporation
- Type: Subsidiary
- Traded as: NYSE: DEXO
- Industry: Print and interactive marketing
- Headquarters: Dallas, Texas, U.S.
- Parent: Dex Media
- Website: www.dexone.com

Dex One Corporation was an American marketing company providing online, mobile and print search marketing via their DexKnows.com website, print yellow pages directories and pay-per-click ad networks in the U.S.

In April 2013 Dex One merged with SuperMedia, and the combined company (after further acquisitions) now does business as Thryv Inc.

== History ==
Dex One Corporation was originally established as the R.H. Donnelley Company in 1886 by Reuben H. Donnelley, son of RR Donnelley founder Richard R. Donnelley. R.H. Donnelley primarily contracted with The Chicago Telephone Company to publish telephone directories for its Chicago customers. In 1906, the company began contracting with Bell System firms, including New York Telephone, Wisconsin Telephone, and Cincinnati Suburban Telephone Co.

In 1917, The R.H. Donnelley Comp any was incorporated and moved to New York City, retaining some offices in Chicago. Reuben Donnelley died in 1929; while his company endured, continuing its contract with the Bell System to publish telephone directories nationally.

In 1961, R. H. Donnelley was acquired, as a wholly owned subsidiary, by Dun & Bradstreet.

=== Partnerships ===
Following its merger with Dun & Bradstreet, the company began a series of partnerships with additional telephone companies to publish directories. Around this time, competition started with other phone companies to provide directories.

From 1980 to 1985, R.H. Donnelley began a partnership with United Telephone (Sprint), called Uni-Don, to publish telephone directories to customers in central Florida.

In 1986, it contracted with NYNEX to become its directory sales agent. The same year, R.H. Donnelley started publishing directories in Delaware, New Jersey, and Pennsylvania in competition with Bell Atlantic, many of which were later sold off to Yellow Book

In 1988, it formed Cen-Don with Centel (now part of CenturyLink) to publish telephone directories in Florida, Illinois, Iowa, Minnesota, Nevada, North Carolina, Ohio, and Virginia. Venture One was formed with Southwestern Bell Corporation, which published directories in competition with Bell Atlantic in Baltimore, Maryland, and Washington, D.C.

In 1990, when the company and Ameritech renewed their joint venture, Amdon, it was renamed DonTech, and acquired a singular management team. The rebranded partnership continued to publish telephone directories in Illinois and northwest Indiana.

=== Aquisitions ===
On July 1, 1998, Dun & Bradstreet split into two companies, one assumed the Dun & Bradstreet name, while the other adopted the R.H. Donnelley name.

In 2003, R.H. Donnelley acquired Sprint Publishing & Advertising from Sprint Corporation, later rebranded from Sprint Yellow Pages to EMBARQ Yellow Pages.

In 2004, R.H. Donnelley acquired the directory publishing business of SBC Communications in Illinois and northwest Indiana, along with the SBC interest in DonTech. As a result, R.H. Donnelley gained a 50-year licensing agreement to use the SBC Yellow Pages name on all directories published for SBC Illinois customers. Following the AT&T merger, the directories were known as "AT&T Yellow Pages published by R.H. Donnelley".

In 2006, R.H. Donnelley completed its acquisition of Dex Media, which had been spun off from Qwest in 2002-2003. Following the acquisition, R.H. Donnelley became the third-largest directory publisher in the United States.

In January 2007, R.H. Donnelley bought Local Launch Search Marketing. That July, the company acquired Business.com.

== NYSE, R.H. Donnelley bankruptcy (2009) ==
On December 31, 2008, the New York Stock Exchange (NYSE) suspended trading of R.H. Donnelley due to the company's market capitalization falling below $25 million for 30 consecutive trading days, which failed to meet the Exchange's listing standards. As a result of this suspension, R.H. Donnelley began trading its common stock over-the-counter (OTC) on the Pink Sheets beginning on January 2, 2009, under the symbol "RHDC".

In June 2009, R.H. Donnelley Corporation and its subsidiaries filed for bankruptcy. On February 1, 2010, R.H. Donnelley Corporation emerged from bankruptcy, renamed Dex One Corporation, and the NYSE began trading Dex One Corporation shares under the "DEXO" ticker symbol.

== Merger with SuperMedia, Dex One bankruptcy (2013) ==
On August 21, 2012, Dex One and SuperMedia announced a stock for stock merger transaction. In March 2013, Dex One filed for Chapter 11 bankruptcy protection in an effort to finalize the merger. The merger closed on April 30, 2013. The new company is called Dex Media (not to be confused with the original Dex Media).

The merger reunites directory operations formerly part of Ameritech in Illinois, Verizon, and Qwest, all of which have not been under common ownership since the Bell System divestiture in 1983.

== See also ==
- Dex Media - company acquired in 2006
- RR Donnelley - otherwise unrelated company founded by the father of Reuben H. Donnelley
