= TW Telecom =

American telecommunications company

tw telecom Inc.
- Formerly: Time Warner Communications
- Industry: Telecom
- Founded: 1993; 33 years ago
- Fate: Acquired by Level 3 Communications; Level 3 acquired by CenturyLink (now Lumen Technologies)
- Headquarters: Lone Tree, Colorado, United States

TW Telecom (styled tw telecom), was a business telecommunications company headquartered in Littleton, Colorado, United States. The company provided business voice services, transport, Internet, data services and wholesale fiber capacity. It was an early leader in the deployment of Ethernet for metropolitan areas, dubbed Metro Ethernet. The company was acquired by Level 3 Communications on November 1, 2014. Exactly three years later, CenturyLink (now Lumen Technologies) acquired Level 3 Communications.

== History ==
Founded in 1993 as Time Warner Communications, the company was a joint venture between US West and Time Warner Cable, a division of Time Warner Entertainment, to deliver data and telecommunication services over a hybrid fiber and coaxial network. The company was successful in their efforts, but at the time the cost to build fiber directly to consumer's homes proved too expensive to be profitable. In the mid-1990s the company evolved into a "carriers carrier" selling "dark fiber" capacity to other telecom and Internet providers to supplement their networks.

The company played a role in growth of the Internet as it built and assembled a national fiber network. Management realized that to continue to grow it needed to offer communication solutions alongside its wholesale network offerings.

In July 1998, Time Warner Communications became a separate entity and was reorganized into Time Warner Telecom LLC. In May 1999, the company made an initial public offering. In 1997, the company began delivering communications services to medium and large business customers, carriers and governmental entities. In March 2003, the company introduced Metro Ethernet services, an expansion of the Ethernet model of building-wide communications networks. The metro capability basically expanded the use of Ethernet across a city or region allowing for seamless connectivity of locations that were on the network of connected Ethernet rings. This capability enabled the company to offer advanced Internet, data and voice services.

In July 2006, Time Warner Telecom acquired Xspedius Communications for $531.5 million, adding additional metropolitan markets. TW Telecom had operations in 75 markets across the U.S..

== Name Change ==
On July 1, 2008, the company was renamed TW Telecom. The company had used the name Time Warner Telecom under an agreement with Time Warner Inc., its former parent company. The name was changed when Time Warner Inc. declined to renew the agreement allowing the use of its name. The company had considered several names, but elected to use the initials "tw" to help maintain its brand legacy in the marketplace.

== Acquisition ==
On June 16, 2014, the company agreed to be acquired by Level 3 Communications Inc. for $5.7 billion in cash and stock.
