= Northwestern Bell =

Former telephone company in the US

Northwestern Bell Telephone Company
- Northwestern Bell logo, 1969–1983
- Industry: Telecommunications
- Founded: 1896; 130 years ago
- Defunct: 1999; 27 years ago
- Fate: Merged
- Successor: U S WEST Communications
- Headquarters: Omaha, Nebraska, U.S.
- Products: Local Telephone Service
- Parent: American Bell (1896-1899); AT&T (1899-1983); US WEST (1984-1999)

Northwestern Bell Telephone Company was an American telecommunications service provider that served the states of the upper Midwest opposite the Southwestern Bell area, including Iowa, Minnesota, South Dakota, North Dakota and Nebraska. As of late summer 1999, this telephone company is no longer operating. The company did business as US West from 1984 (just after the breakup of the Bell System). It was later merged with Mountain Bell and the Pacific Northwest Bell in the late 1980s and then phased away about eight years after the US West merging. The successors of the Northwestern Bell Telephone were US West (which in turn was replaced with Qwest in 2000 and later by CenturyLink Communications eleven years after that).

== History ==
=== Early beginnings ===
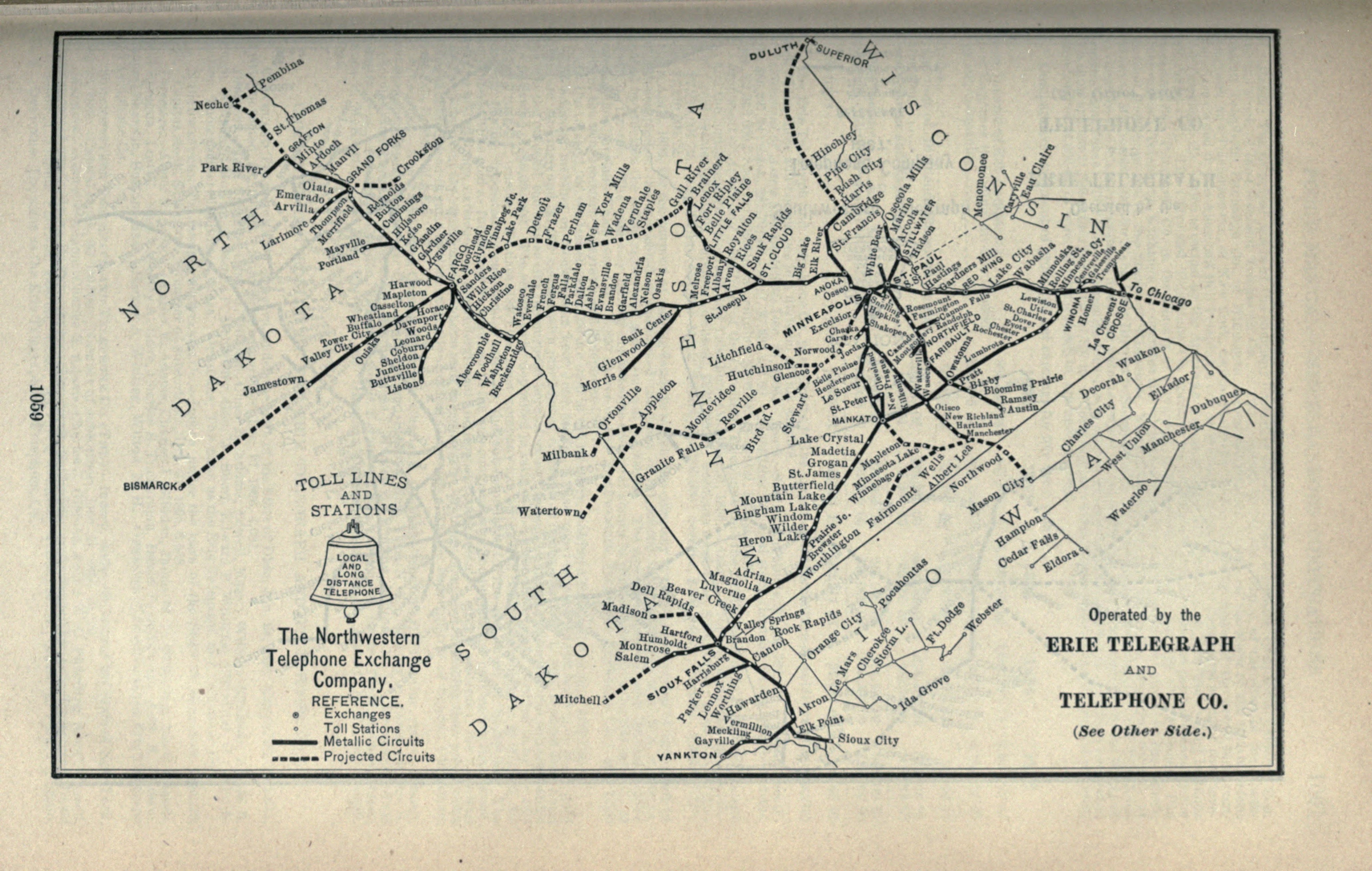
1897 map of service area

It has never been definitively established where Northwestern Bell's earliest roots lie. The earliest record of telephones in the Northwestern Bell service area was a two-telephone intercom circuit used by a Little Falls, Minnesota, druggist and his clerk in 1876. A Bell-licensed exchange is believed to have opened in Deadwood, South Dakota, between March and August 1878, just two years after Alexander Graham Bell invented the telephone, and several months before President Rutherford B. Hayes could use his phone in a little wooden booth outside of his office in the White House.

The earliest documented telephone exchange in Northwestern Bell territory was opened by Western Union in Keokuk, Iowa, on September 1, 1878. Using superior equipment designed by Thomas Edison and Elisha Gray, Western Union was in a competitive shoot-out with the local licensees of the National Bell Telephone Company of Boston. On November 10, 1879, Western Union settled a Bell patent infringement suit by getting completely out of the phone business and selling all of its exchanges, including the Keokuk exchange, to the Bell Company.

In the fall of 1878, the Northwestern Telephone Company opened an "experimental" exchange in Minneapolis City Hall. It served the city government as well as the Nicollet Hotel and Pillsbury Mills. This exchange was the forerunner of the Bell-licensed Northwestern Telephone Exchange Company which was incorporated on December 10, 1878.

On July 11, 1939, Northwestern Bell Telephone established dial service in Fargo, North Dakota.

=== Building Northwestern Bell ===
Northwestern Bell logo, 1984-1988

Telephone companies in the Northwestern Bell Group included the Tri-State Telephone Company, the Dakota Central Telephone Company, the Iowa Telephone Company, the Nebraska Telephone Company and the Northwestern Telephone Exchange.

Casper E. Yost served as the president of all the companies. It was a confusing arrangement to regulators, employees and even to the parent company, AT&T. In a letter to AT&T, Yost explained that when he was answering a question, making a proposal or discussing a problem in his correspondence with AT&T, he would use the letterhead of the particular company to which the question, problem or proposal related. One problem with this arrangement, especially for local telephone staffers and historians, is that the carbons of Yost's letters contain no letterheads.

Things became less confusing when the Tri-State and Dakota Central companies were folded into the Northwestern Telephone Exchange Company. In 1909, a single general office staff for the Iowa, Nebraska and Exchange companies was established in Omaha.

On December 10, 1920, Iowa Telephone changed its name to Northwestern Bell Telephone Company. In January, 1921, the Nebraska and Northwestern Telephone Exchange companies were merged into the new company. While the new company was incorporated in Iowa, its headquarters remained in Omaha.

== Sale of telephone lines ==
In 1976, Northwestern Bell sold access lines in the Midland, Philip, Martin, White River, Milesville, and Hayes exchanges to Golden West Telephone, a small telephone cooperative in South Dakota.

== Headquarters ==
The Northwestern Bell headquarters, now the AT&T Building (owned by CenturyLink), was located at 118 South 19th Street in Omaha, Nebraska.

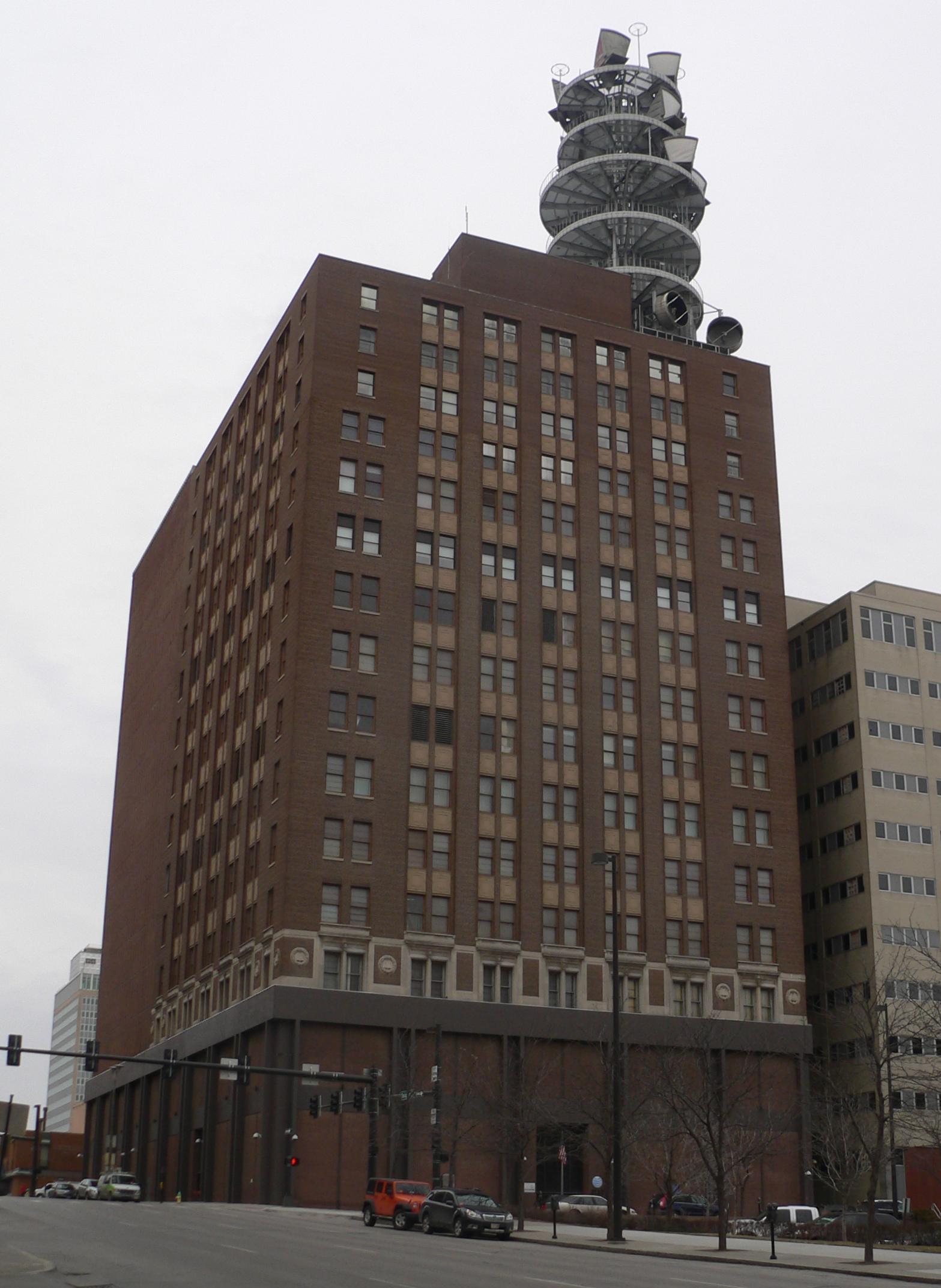

== Name usage ==
The Northwestern Bell name is still licensed for use today on telephone equipment produced by Unical Enterprises; outside of that the NWBT name has disappeared. However, according to CenturyLink and multiple other sources, there are the chances of Northwestern Bell being revived one day although this is not likely. Also, the northwesternbell.com domain is still active and rolls over to the CenturyLink webpage.
