= Dex Media =

Dex Media, Inc.
- Industry: Print and Interactive Marketing
- Predecessor: Qwest
- Founded: 2002
- Parent: The Carlyle Group, etc. (2002-2004); R. H. Donnelley/Dex One (2006-2013)

Dex Media, Inc. was a print and interactive marketing company. It was formed in 2002 by a consortium led by The Carlyle Group to acquire the operations of Qwest Dex from Qwest Communications International. The company went public in 2004 and was acquired by R.H. Donnelley in 2006, which became DEX One in 2010.

== History ==
=== US West Dex ===
In 1988, US West began marketing its telephone services under the one "US West" name. US West, in 1995, divided its companies into two core divisions: US West Communications, and US West Media Group. US West placed its directory operations in the hands of the Media Group, creating US West Dex. US West Dex, Inc. became the new name of US West's publishing company.

=== QwestDex ===
QwestDex logo, 2000-2003

In 2000, Qwest Communications International acquired US West. As a result, US West was renamed Qwest, and US West Dex, Inc. was renamed Qwest Dex, Inc. In 2002, Qwest underwent a drastic reorganization, and Qwest searched for a buyer for QwestDex, Inc.

=== Dex Media ===
On August 20, 2002, The Carlyle Group, Welsh, Carson, Anderson & Stowe, along with other private investors, led a $7.5 billion buyout of QwestDex. The buyout was the third largest corporate buyout since 1989.

QwestDex's purchase occurred in two stages. In November 2002, directory operations in Colorado, Iowa, Minnesota, Nebraska, New Mexico, North Dakota, and South Dakota were acquired for $2.75 billion. These operations were known as Dex Media East LLC. In 2003, directory operations in Arizona, Idaho, Montana, Oregon, Utah, Washington and Wyoming were acquired for $4.30 billion. These operations became known as Dex Media West LLC.

After completion of the formation of Dex Media, Dex signed a 50-year agreement with Qwest to be the official directory provider to Qwest local telephone customers. The sale of QwestDex marked the first time a Baby Bell sold its telephone directory operations.

In July 2004, Dex Media went public and began trading on the NYSE under the ticker "DEX". On October 3, 2005, R. H. Donnelley Corporation announced its intent to acquire Dex Media. RHD's acquisition of Dex was completed on January 31, 2006. Following RHD's 2009 bankruptcy, it renamed itself Dex One Corporation retaining its headquarters in Cary, North Carolina.

In August 2012, Dex One and SuperMedia LLC announced their two companies would be merging to form Dex Media, Inc. In March 2013, Dex One filed for Chapter 11 bankruptcy protection in an effort to finalize the merger. The merger was completed on April 30, 2013 and the company began trading publicly on the NASDAQ stock exchange on May 1, 2013 under the symbol DXM. In August 2013, Geoff Fitzgibbons, visionary of the orange bundles, resigned leaving a post he held under three previous mergers.
