= HTC Apache =

Smartphone manufactured by HTC

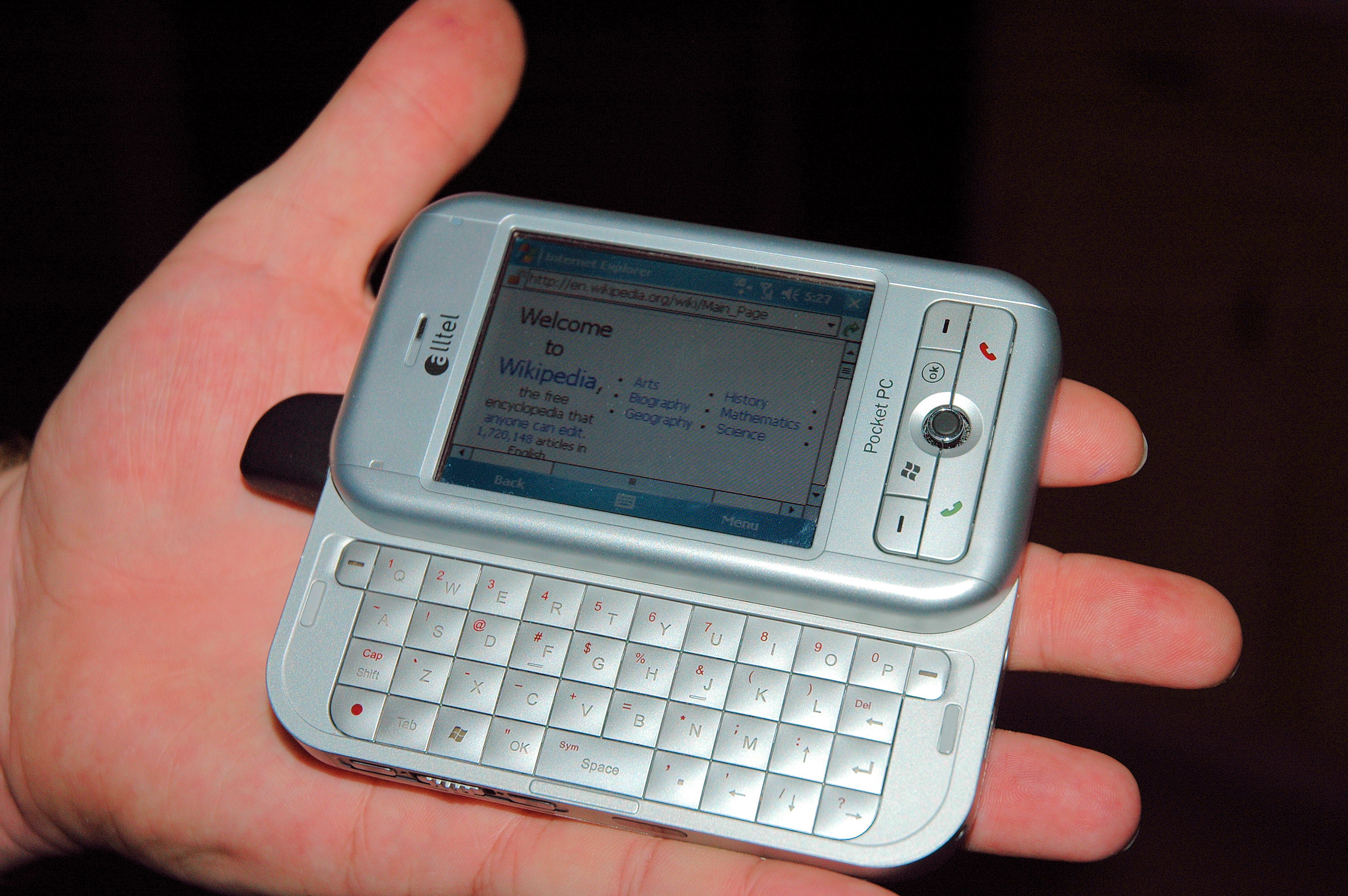
- Manufacturer: UTStarcom
- Type: Pocket PC smartphone
- Media: MiniSD, 128 MB internal memory
- Operating system: Windows Mobile 5–6.5
- CPU: 416 MHz PXA270
- Display: 64k-color TFT
- Input: Keyboard/touchscreen
- Camera: 1.3-megapixel
- Touchpad: Sensitive touchscreen
- Connectivity: Bluetooth, WiFi, USB, IR
- Power: Battery
- Successor: HTC Titan

The HTC Apache is a Windows Mobile 5.0 device, sold as the PPC-6700 by Sprint, and the XV6700 by Verizon Wireless and other US carriers. The device was one of the first CDMA Windows Mobile 5.0 devices on the market, and the first to be released in the United States. The Apache is a Pocket PC PDA with smartphone capabilities.

The upgraded generation of the model is the HTC Mogul, also known as the HTC Titan, the PPC-6800, or the XV6800 from Verizon Wireless.

== Features ==
- CDMA 1xRTT/EVDO
- Bluetooth
- 802.11b Wi-Fi
- 1.3 Megapixel camera/camcorder
- Built in QWERTY slide out keyboard (but no hardware ctrl key)
- Blue LED keyboard backlight
- 2.88" 64K color TFT touchscreen
- Speakerphone
- USB and infrared dial up networking
- MiniSD / MMC card slot

Reference: Section 5.4 of the Verizon XV6700 User Manual (expansion slot compatible with miniSD and MMC cards)

== Specifications ==
- Band: CDMA 800/1900
- Weight: 6.07 oz
- Dimensions: 4.25" x 2.32" x 0.93"
- Battery Type: Lithium Ion polymer 1350 mAh
- Display Resolution: 240x320 16-bit QVGA
- Java: Yes, MIDP: 2.0
- Built in memory: 128 MB (Flash memory), 64 MB Ram
- Operating system: Windows Mobile 5.0 for Pocket PC Phone Edition

Due to the popularity of the device there are many unofficial Operating System releases found on the Internet. Most notably, Windows Mobile 6.5 Professional.
