= 1801 California Street =

Skyscraper in Denver, Colorado

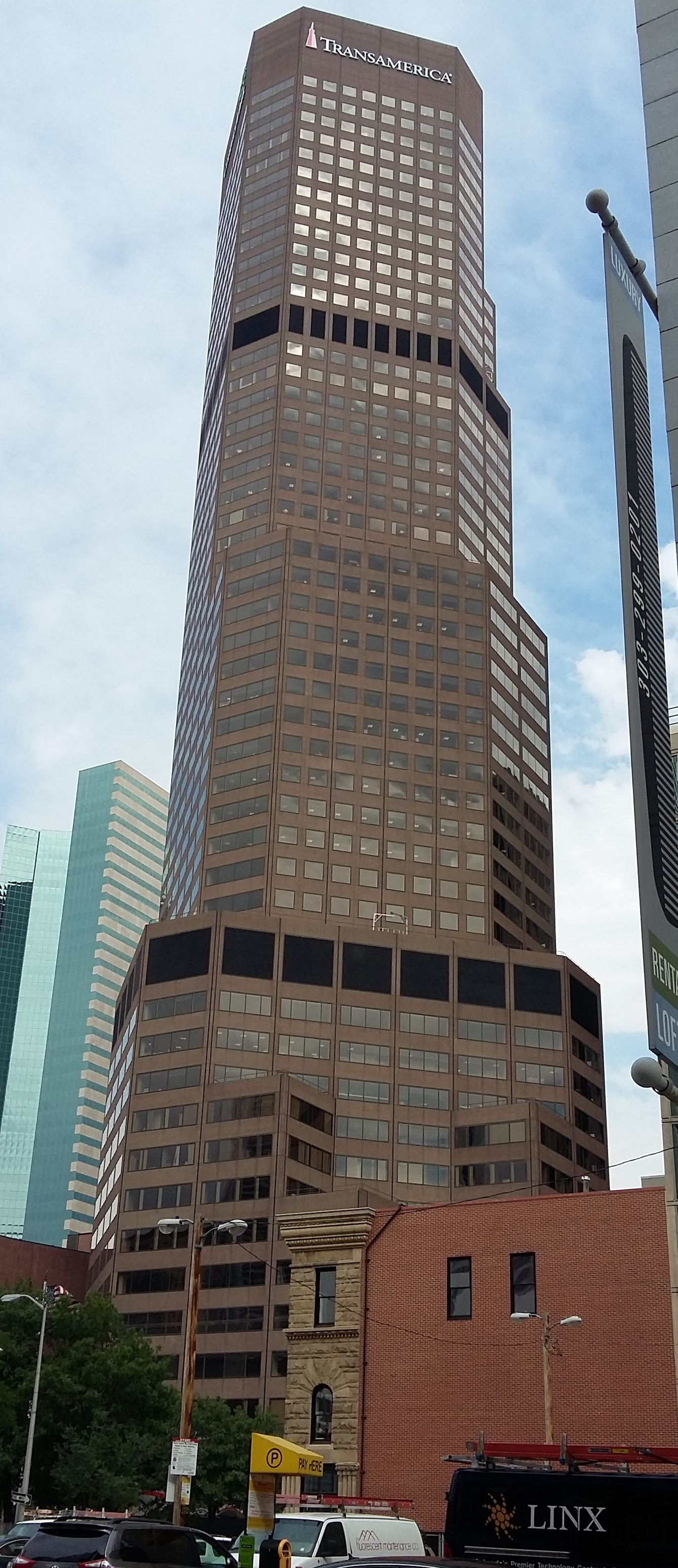
- 1801 California Street topped with the Transamerica logo in June 2016.

- Location within Colorado

General information
- Status: Completed
- Type: Office
- Location: 1801 California Street, Denver, Colorado; USA
- Coordinates: 39°44′52″N 104°59′23″W
- Opening: 1982
- Owner: AFL-CIO Building Investment Trust (51%)

Height
- Roof: 709 ft (216 m)

Technical details
- Floor count: 53 (51 occupied)
- Floor area: 118,872 m^{2} (1,279,530 ft^{2})

Design and construction
- Architects: Metz, Train & Youngren
- Main contractor: The Weitz Company

Website
- www.brookfieldproperties.com/en/our-properties/1801-california-street-29.html

1801 California Street is a skyscraper in Denver, Colorado. The building was completed in 1983, and rises 53 floors and 709 feet (216 m) in height. The building stands as the second-tallest building in Denver and Colorado, and as the 151st-tallest building in the United States.

1801 California Street was previously occupied by offices for US West, and then served as the world headquarters of Qwest Communications. In summer 2011 following CenturyLink's acquisition of Qwest, the Qwest sign was removed from the top and replaced with the CenturyLink sign. Upon its completion in 1983, the building stood as the tallest building in the city. However, it held that distinction for less than a year, being surpassed by Republic Plaza in 1984.

The building has a brown concrete façade, and has a stepped design featuring four setbacks. It is an example of late-modernist high-rise architecture. The shape of the building resembles two interlocked octagonal sections, which separate near the building's roof. The roof houses an antenna mast; with this structure included, the building reaches to a total height of 738 feet (225 m), surpassing the 717-foot (219 m) roof of Republic Plaza. Therefore, when measuring by pinnacle height, 1801 California Street remains the tallest building in Denver.

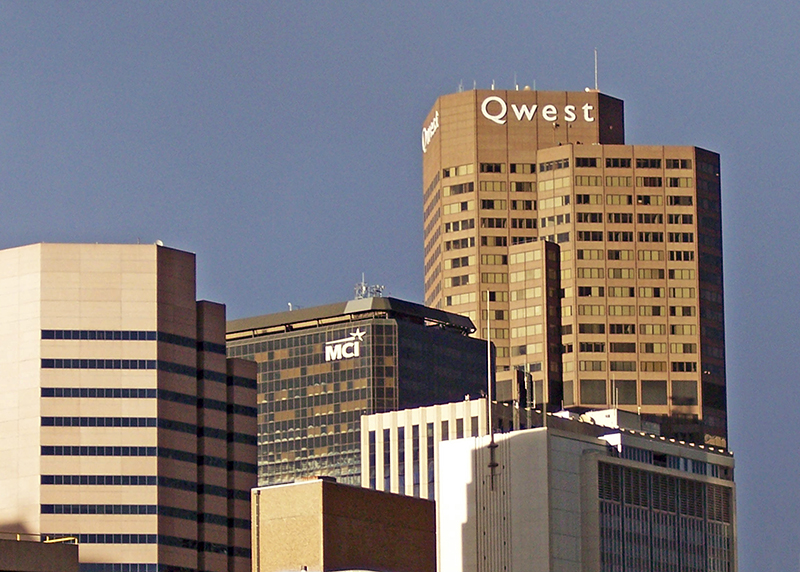
1801 California Street prior to 2011 re branding.

1801 California Street once held the distinction of hosting the brightest high-rise signs in the world, surpassing even the brightly lit high-rise logos found on the skyscrapers of Shanghai and Hong Kong. Four Qwest logos were installed in 2000, after the corporation moved their offices from 555 17th Street, situated two blocks away. The signs, light blue in color, were at the time the brightest high-rise lights in the world, visible from over 70 miles (113 km) away. However, Qwest removed the signs in 2004 due to increasing complaints from residents of Downtown Denver and rising energy costs, and the lights were replaced with ones of a darker blue color. In December 2011, Brookfield Office Properties acquired 1801 California Street from Public Service Enterprise Group for $215 million. In October 2015 the Transamerica logo was added to the skyscraper. On November 2, 2015 Transamerica relocated its Denver operations to 1801 California and now occupies several floors of the building.

In the lobby of the building is an Ink Coffee and 1801 Eatery, and the Guard and Grace steakhouse. Brookfield sold a 51% interest in the property to AFL-CIO Building Investment Trust for $286 million on March 30, 2018.

Exterior shots of the building were used as the setting for Colbyco in the television series Dynasty.

== September 11th Stair Climb ==
On September 11, 2004, five Denver Metro firefighters decided to climb 110 flights of stairs in memory of the 343 firefighter lives lost on Sept. 11, 2001. Word spread quickly of their tribute and by 2007, 150 firefighters made the climb. Since then, every year, exactly 343 Denver Metro firefighters climb 110 flights of stairs of 1801 California Street in Denver.

== See also ==
- List of tallest buildings in Denver
- List of tallest buildings in the United States

Preceded by 707 17th Street	Tallest building in Denver; 1983—1984; 216 m	Succeeded by Republic Plaza
