= Qwest Wireless =

U.S. Cellular telephone service discontinued in 2004

Qwest logo

Qwest Wireless LLC was a cellular phone service owned by Qwest Communications and offered in the United States. Qwest Wireless was a mobile virtual network operator (MVNO) that operated on Sprint's CDMA network. While Qwest originally owned its own wireless network, it discontinued that network in 2004 as part of the move to become an MVNO. The network elements were sold to other carriers after shutdown. Qwest was the only Baby Bell that offered its wireless service as an MVNO; since the wireless company used Sprint's network, most of their phones were Sprint phones with the Qwest name on them. Their phones included models from Sanyo, Samsung, Nokia, UT Starcom (formerly Audiovox), HTC, and Motorola. Qwest Wireless ended the year 2007 with 824,000 wireless subscribers.

== History ==
Prior to Qwest's acquisition of the RBOC US West, and unrelated to US West Wireless which became Qwest Wireless, US West operated its own analog cellular service, which merged with AirTouch and was eventually combined with GTE and PrimeCo to become Verizon Wireless.

In 1998, US West Wireless (later Qwest Wireless) was launched as a standalone brand with its own network based in the then-US West 14-state region. Qwest Wireless maintained its own network elements, device inventory, billing, and service—offering combined billing and eventually, discounts for customers who purchased other, qualifying Qwest services. At its largest, Qwest Wireless had roughly one million customers, but due to a lack of network availability outside the 14-state Qwest region, the service suffered from slow growth. This lack of on-network coverage was only partially offset by Qwest Wireless' advanced network features, most notably One Number Service (ONS). ONS allowed customers to receive calls to their home phone number on the wireless. If the calls were not answered, the calls then rang normally on the home phone. Also available was Voice Messaging Link (VML), allowing the wireless and wireline phones to share a single voice mail box.

Due to the slow growth and high expense of maintaining a regional wireless network, Qwest Wireless was converted to an MVNO in 2003–2004. Most customers were able to keep their own handsets, requiring only an over-the-air software update to move to the Sprint network. Customers with older handsets were given free replacement devices. The advanced network features such as ONS and VML were still offered with Qwest Wireless after the move to the then-Sprint network (now T-Mobile US). With an MVNO status, Qwest Wireless was no longer harmed by the lack of a national footprint, but the small size of the brand meant that Qwest Wireless was unable to respond to the increasing importance of handset marketing. Rarely able to offer new, exclusive handsets, Qwest Wireless lacked the buzz that came from these devices, notably the Motorola RAZR and Apple iPhone. In addition, the small subscriber base prevented Qwest Wireless from offering a broad range of handsets, leaving the company with only one or two smartphone offerings as those handsets became increasingly important to wireless carriers due to the higher per-user revenue.

On May 5, 2006, Qwest ended their agreement with Sprint Nextel and signed a 5-year contract with Verizon Wireless. Qwest has decided that they will no longer maintain an MVNO and will only resell Verizon Wireless services. The agreement also includes an arrangement to bill Verizon Wireless services on Qwest bills.

On March 11, 2008, Qwest announced that Qwest Wireless service would be terminated on October 31, 2011.

== Verizon Wireless agent/partnership ==
On July 28, 2008, Qwest began selling Verizon service to new customers and in August, 2008 began to offer current Qwest Wireless customers the ability to make the transition to Verizon. In October, 2008, Qwest began offering combined billing, adding the Verizon charges to the Qwest bill upon customer request. The transition of current Qwest Wireless customers went smoothly according to CEO Ed Mueller.

The Qwest sales arrangement allowed Qwest to function as an agent for Verizon Wireless, selling Verizon-branded services while simultaneously offering the combined billing for customers with both services. Qwest does not maintain inventory of Verizon devices, is not responsible for service provisioning and maintenance, and does not calculate the Verizon bill.

The transition of Qwest Wireless customers began in August 2008, initially focusing on customers who did not have other Qwest services ("standalone" wireless service). Customers who also had other Qwest services were allowed to "migrate", but were not marketed to directly until October, 2008, when combined Qwest/Verizon Wireless billing was available. In October, 2008, Qwest began offering bundled billing, providing a combined Qwest/Verizon Wireless bill and discounting the Qwest services for qualifying customers who choose to add Verizon to the Qwest bill. Financial terms of this agreement are not being disclosed. Current Qwest Wireless customers will be offered a comparable phone for free by Verizon, or the option to receive 25% off a different phone of the customers choice if they choose to move to Verizon. Activation fees are also waived for migrating customers, as are early termination fees if the customer has a term agreement with Qwest Wireless. With the March 11, 2009 announcement of an end date, Qwest Wireless also discontinued the practice of charging early termination fees for customers who have term agreements with the carrier.
