= Pacific Northwest Bell =

American telecommunications company

Pacific Northwest Bell Telephone Company
- Pacific Northwest Bell logo, 1969–1983
- Company type: Division
- Industry: Telecommunications
- Predecessor: Pacific Telephone and Telegraph
- Founded: July 1, 1961; 64 years ago
- Defunct: January 1, 1991; 35 years ago
- Fate: Merged into Mountain Bell
- Successor: US West Communications
- Headquarters: Seattle, Washington, U.S.
- Area served: Oregon, Washington, Northern Idaho
- Parent: AT&T (1961–1983); US West (1984–1991)

The Pacific Northwest Bell Telephone Company was an American telecommunications company based in Seattle, Washington. It was a local exchange carrier for the Bell System, the AT&T Corporation-controlled network of companies, providing telecommunications services in Oregon, Washington, and northern Idaho. Pacific Northwest Bell was formed in 1961 when it was spun off from the Pacific Telephone and Telegraph Company. Pacific Northwest Bell was split from AT&T in 1984 as ordered in the settlement of United States v. AT&T and became a subsidiary of US West, a then-newly formed Regional Bell Operating Company. US West consolidated its three main operating subsidiaries in 1991. US West merged with Qwest in 2000, and the US West brand was replaced by the Qwest brand. Qwest Communications merged with Louisiana-based CenturyLink in 2011, and the Qwest brand was replaced by the CenturyLink brand. It now does business with the Lumen Technologies brand as of 2020.

== History ==
=== Sunset Telephone & Telegraph Company ===
On March 7, 1883, the Sunset Telephone-Telegraph Company opened for business with 90 subscribers. This first office was in rented space in the Western Union Telegraph office. Weeks later the company moved into its own building at the corner of Second Avenue and Cherry Street in Seattle, WA.

In 1899 the original company was reincorporated as the Sunset Telephone and Telegraph Company and continued under that name until 1917 when the Sunset Company (which had grown to provide service throughout Washington and northern Idaho) merged with the Pacific Telephone and Telegraph Company.

=== Pacific Telephone & Telegraph and Pacific Northwest Bell ===
Telephones began to crop up all over Oregon, Washington and northern Idaho. The first Seattle-Tacoma to Portland toll line was built in 1893. Assorted independent telephone companies set up competitive business throughout Oregon and Washington. With competition both the Bell and independent companies found it hard to do business and make money. Under the leadership of J. P. Morgan, the nation's most powerful banker, the Bell companies around the country began to buy out their major competitors. By 1924, the Pacific Telephone & Telegraph Company had acquired most of the independents' property along the Pacific Coast. Headquartered in San Francisco, the Bell operating company served customers in California, Nevada, Oregon, Washington and northern Idaho.

As the Pacific Northwest grew in population, AT&T made plans to split off Pacific Telephone and Telegraph's operations there to better serve the region. AT&T started the process by creating a division within the company called Pacific Telephone Northwest on February 1, 1960, then filing articles of incorporation for Pacific Northwest Bell, the new entity that would serve the region, on March 27, 1961. The Washington Public Service Commission approved the formation of Pacific Northwest Bell on June 5, with the separation occurring at midnight on July 1. Its service territory included Oregon, Washington and northern Idaho (Southern Idaho was served by Mountain Bell). The new company's first major job was to build the world's most advanced telephone service to serve the Seattle World's Fair which was scheduled to open in less than ten months (April 21, 1962.) This was accomplished. Pacific Northwest Bell would later issue 40-year debentures worth $50,000,000 via Morgan Stanley in September 1962 to reduce a promissory note held by Pacific Telephone.

=== AT&T breakup ===
A Pacific Northwest Bell logo used between 1984–1988

On January 1, 1984, Pacific Northwest Bell, Mountain Bell and Northwestern Bell became part of US West as part of the breakup of AT&T. The company continued to use the logo it adopted in 1969 but also used a variation which included the tagline "A US West Company".

In 1988, all three of US West's operating companies began doing business as US West Communications. However, the three companies remained legally separate until January 1, 1991, when US West merged its operating companies into Mountain Bell. Mountain Bell formally changed its name to US West Communications the following day. The name is still a registered federal trademark and the domain pacificnorthwestbell.com is also active and points to the CenturyLink website.

== Headquarters ==
Pacific Northwest Bell's headquarters was located in a 32-story building at 1600 Seventh Avenue in Seattle. The building, which was constructed in 1976, was retained by US West and Qwest; CenturyLink sold it in 2012 after acquiring Qwest the previous year.
