= Republic Plaza (Denver) =

Tallest building in Colorado, US

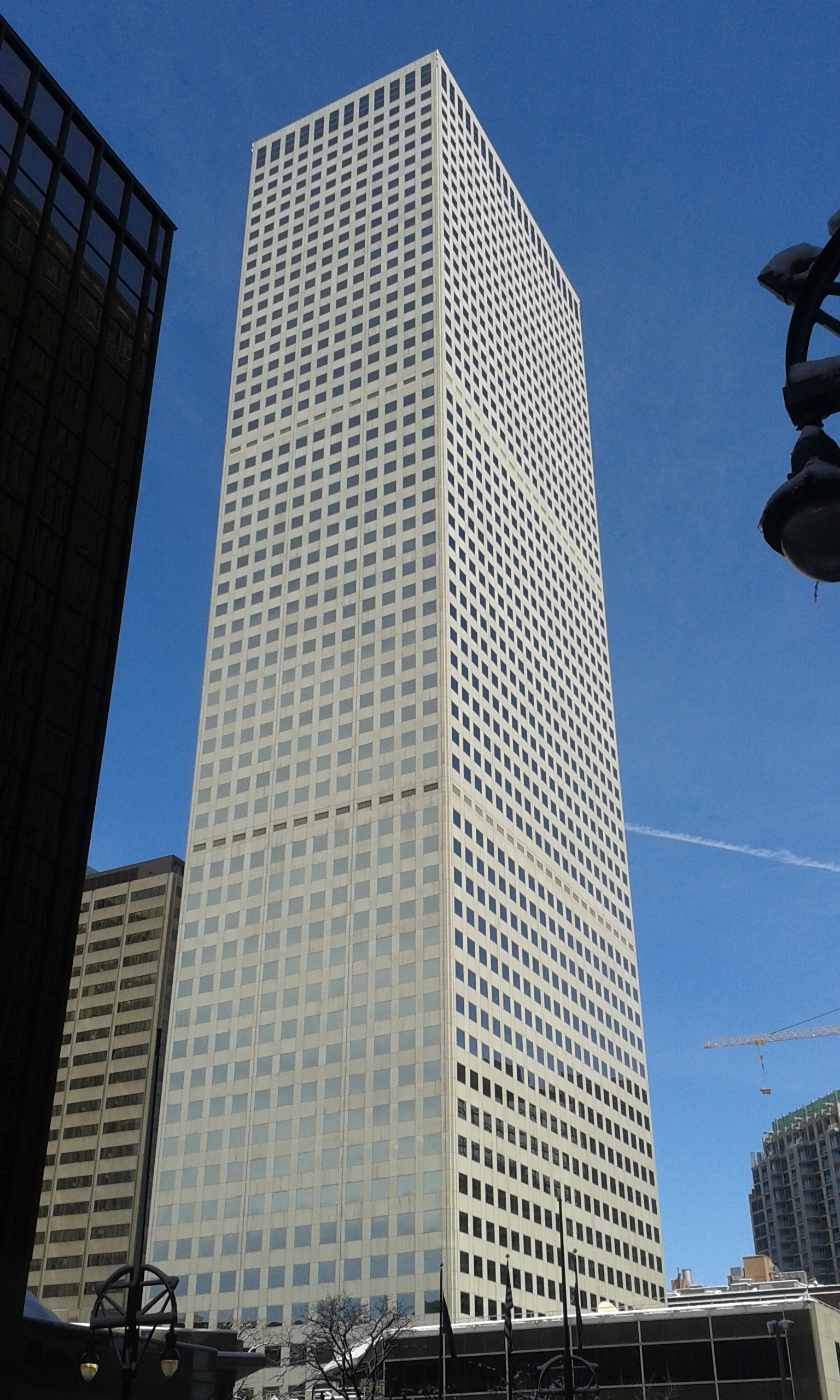
- Republic Plaza in 2016

- Location within Colorado

General information
- Status: Completed
- Type: Office
- Location: 370 17th Street, Denver, Colorado, United States
- Coordinates: 39°44′36″N 104°59′19″W
- Opening: 1984
- Owner: Brookfield Properties (50%) Metlife (50%)

Height
- Roof: 714 ft (218 m)

Technical details
- Floor count: 56
- Floor area: 114,745 m^{2} (1,235,100 ft^{2})
- Lifts/elevators: Otis Double Decker Elevators (floors concourse-53) & Otis Standard Elevators (floors 53-56)

Design and construction
- Architect: Skidmore, Owings & Merrill
- Developer: Brookfield Properties

Republic Plaza is a skyscraper in Denver, Colorado. Rising 714 feet (218 m), the building currently stands as the tallest building in the city of Denver and the entire Rocky Mountain region of the United States. It was built in 1984, and contains 56 floors, the majority of which are used as office space. Republic Plaza currently stands as the 137th-tallest building in the United States.

Designed by Skidmore, Owings & Merrill and built of reinforced concrete clad in Sardinian granite, Republic Plaza includes 1,200,000 square feet (110,000 m^{2}) of office space, and three retail levels containing shops, restaurants, and service businesses. The building has a 3-story marble lobby that features a quarterly "Art in Public Places" program of Colorado and regional artists.

On October 27, 2007, the building's top 20 stories were lit in purple with giant white letters "C" and "R" to celebrate the Colorado Rockies' World Series debut.

The Republic Plaza was built by PCL Construction Services, Inc.

The Republic Plaza is the former home to the American Lung Association in Colorado's "Anthem Fight for Air Climb". Now it is home to the "Mile High Stair Climb", benefitting the American Lung Association in Colorado. Held on the last Sunday of January, the event is a 56-story stair climb to the top of the building with the option of climbing more flights for up to a full vertical mile. On March 7, 2017 Plant Holdings North America, Inc. purchased the property.

== Gallery ==
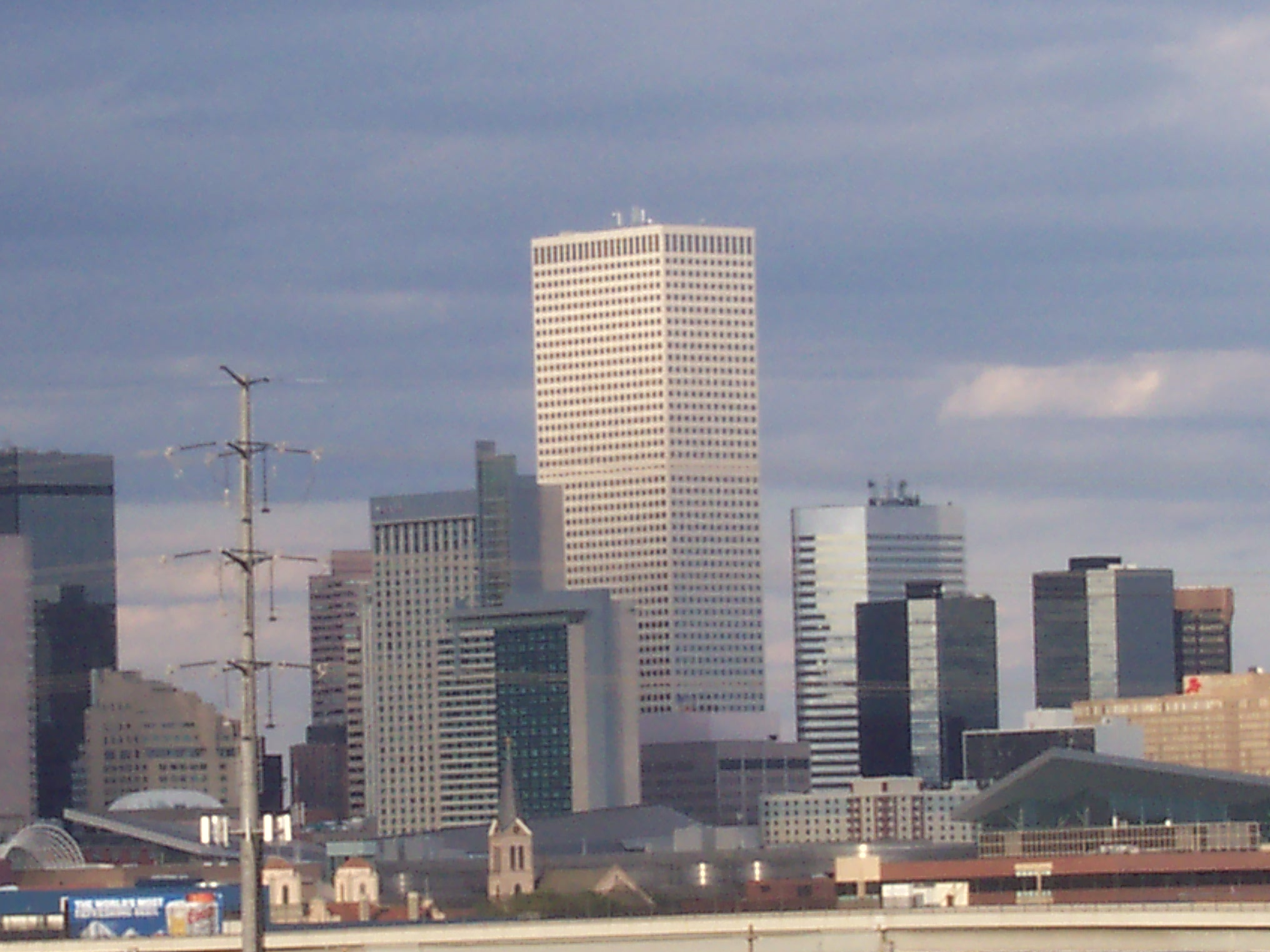

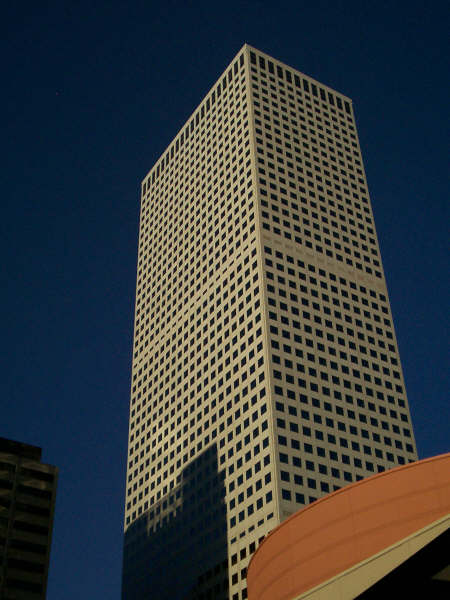

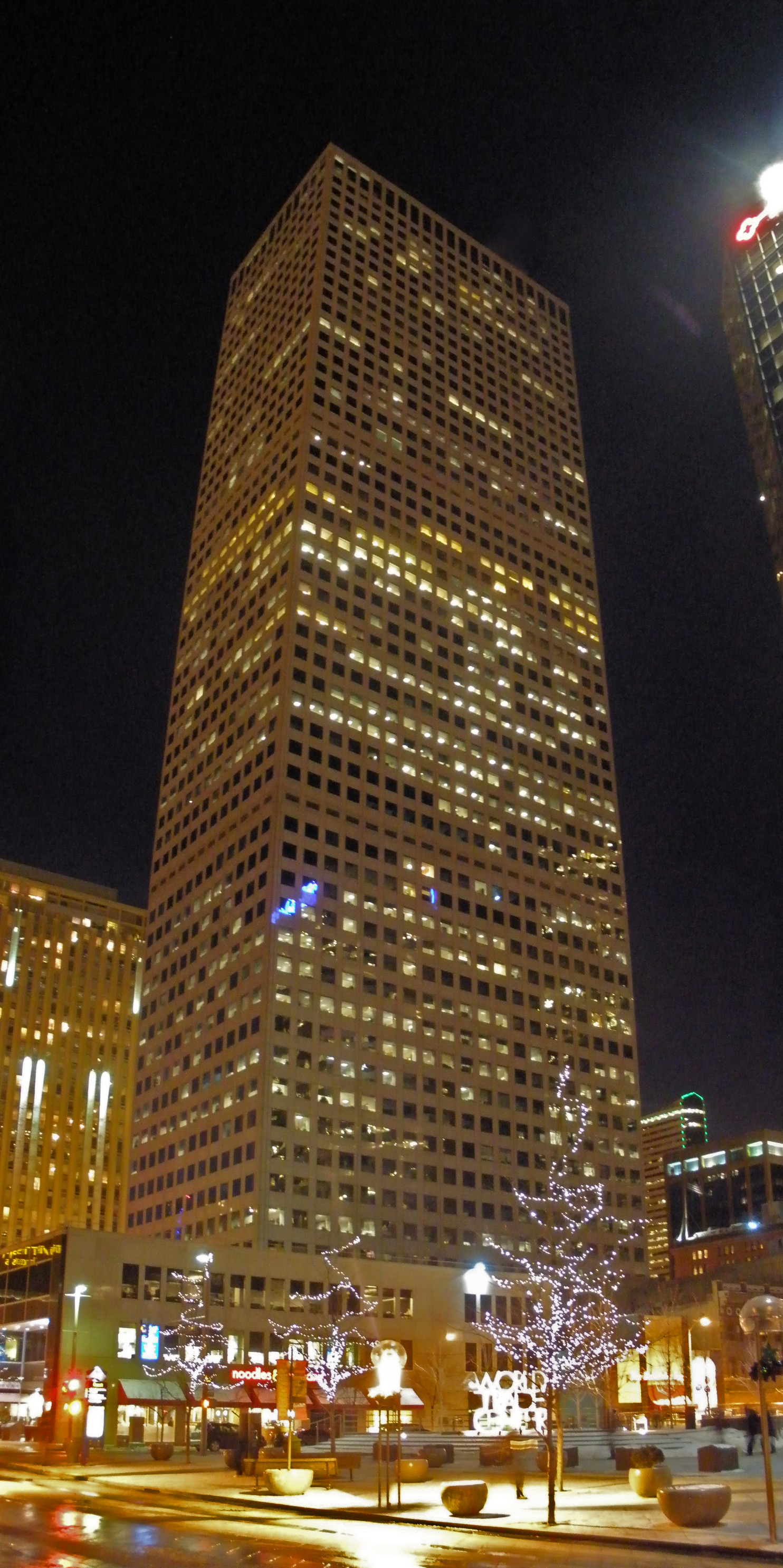

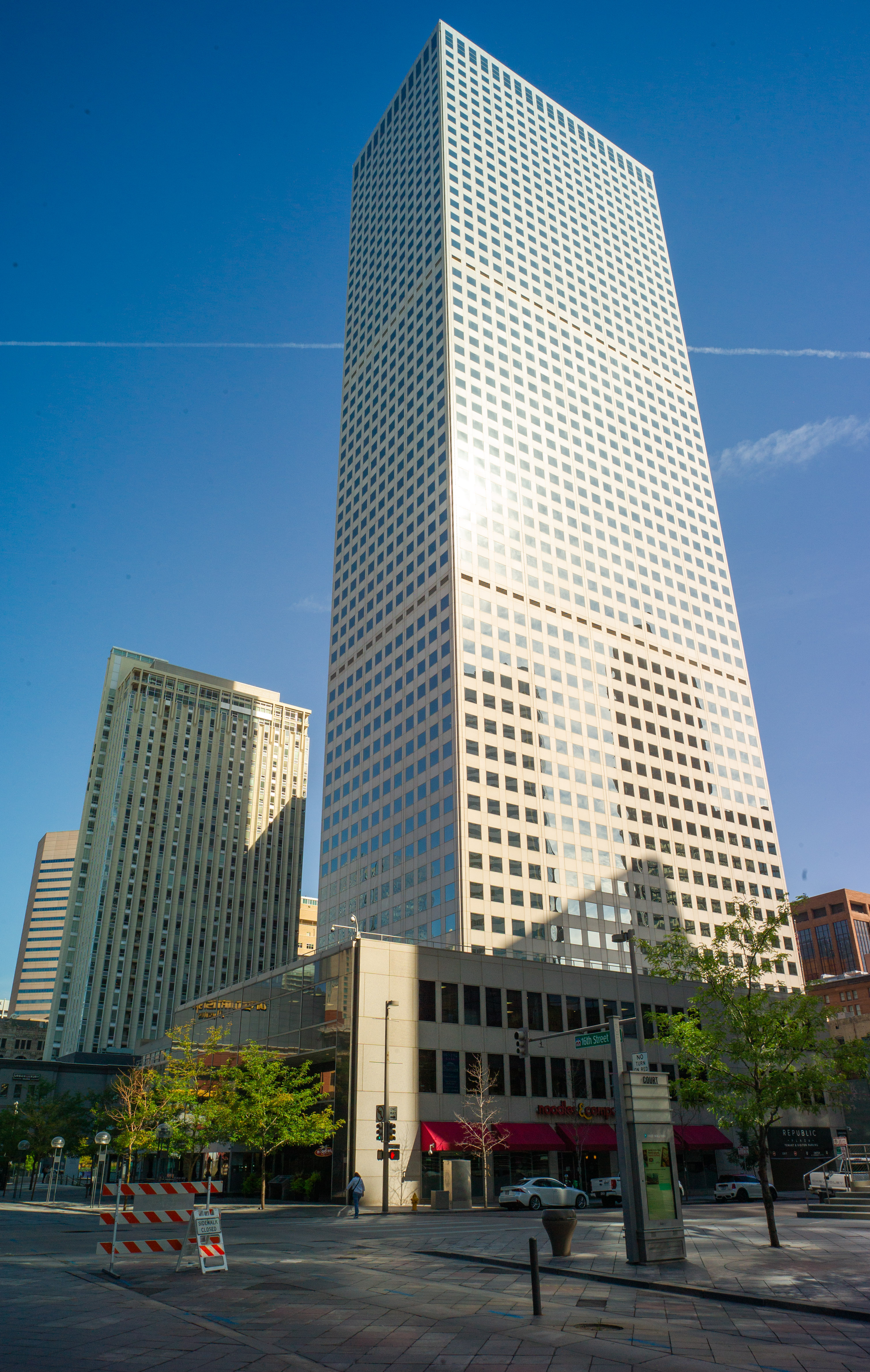

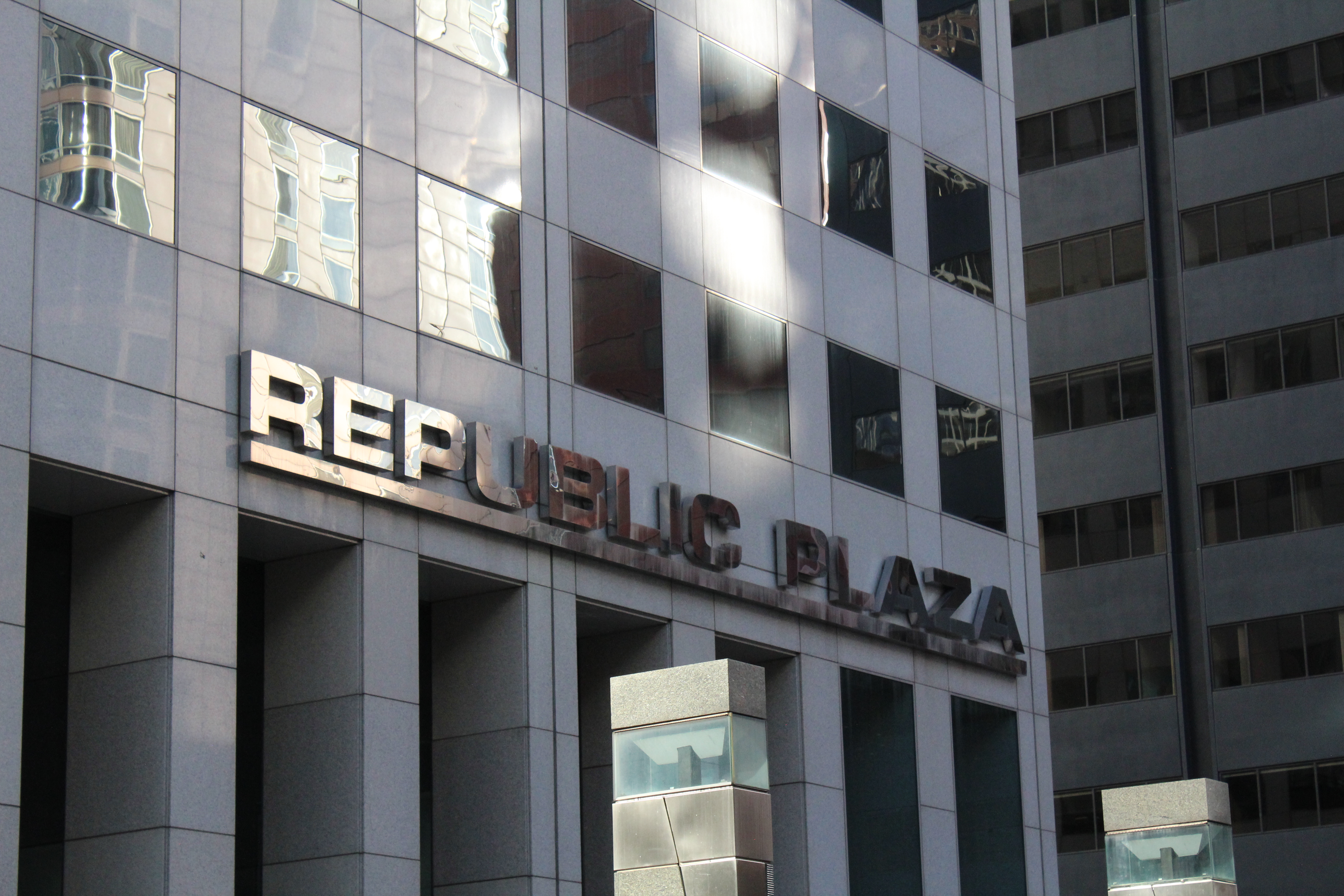

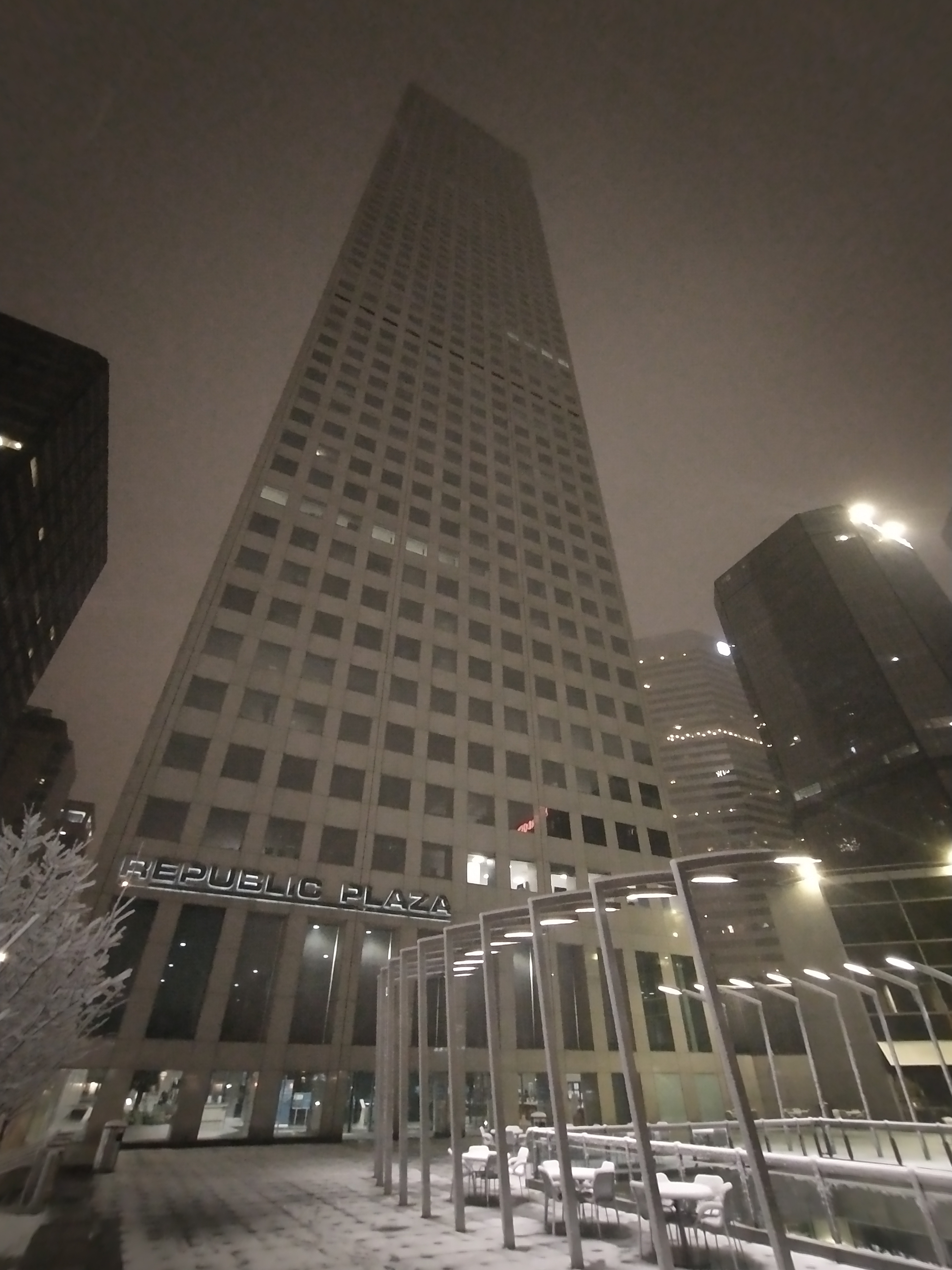

== See also ==
- List of tallest buildings in Denver
- List of tallest buildings by U.S. state

Preceded by 1801 California Street	Tallest Building in Denver; 1984—Present; 218 m	Succeeded by None
