= Qwest Corporation =

Bell Operating Company owned by CenturyLink

- Trade name: CenturyLink QC
- Formerly: Mountain States Telephone and Telegraph Company (1911–1990); US West Communications, Inc. (1991–2000)
- Type: Subsidiary
- Industry: Telecommunications
- Predecessor: Colorado Telephone; Rocky Mountain Bell
- Founded: July 17, 1911; 115 years ago
- Headquarters: 100 Centurylink Dr, Monroe, LA 71203, USA
- Area served: Arizona, Colorado, Idaho, Iowa, Minnesota, Montana, Nebraska, New Mexico, North Dakota, Oregon, South Dakota, Utah, Washington, Wyoming
- Products: Local Telephone Service, FTTH, DSL, and VOIP
- Parent: AT&T Corporation (1911–1983); US West (1984–2000); Qwest (2000–2011); CenturyLink (2011–present)
- Subsidiaries: El Paso County Telephone
- Website: http://www.qwest.com/

Qwest Corporation, doing business as CenturyLink QC, is a Regional Bell Operating Company owned by CenturyLink. It was originally named Mountain States Telephone and Telegraph Company, later becoming known as Mountain Bell, then US West Communications, Inc. from 1991 to 2000. It includes the former operations of Malheur Bell, Northwestern Bell and Pacific Northwest Bell as well.

== History ==
=== Mountain Bell ===
==== Denver Telephone Dispatch Company - 1879 ====
Recent Harvard graduates Frederick O. Vaille, and Henry R. Walcott, went to Denver and met a saloonkeeper, Sam Morgan, and together secured 161 customers, enough to warrant a return to Boston to secure a new telephone franchise from the American Bell Telephone Company.

When the franchise was secured, wires were strung, boys were hired as operators, a switchboard was installed and the Denver Telephone Dispatch Company opened for business on February 24, 1879. The Denver exchange was the seventeenth in the nation, opening just nine days after the Minneapolis exchange. Denver's Rocky Mountain News reported that "The Telephone Company are adding new subscribers to the system every day."

==== Building the Colorado Telephone Company - 1881 ====
Soon after the Denver Dispatch Company began operations, the Western Union-owned Colorado Edison Telephone Company began competitive operations. Western Union also began a phone company in Leadville.

The Edison Company, with its powerful transmitter, was able to offer service to the nearby towns of Golden, Georgetown, Central City, Colorado Springs, and Pueblo.

The competitive battle raged as the Dispatch Company acquired better transmitters and added Golden, Black Hawk, Georgetown and Central City to their calling area. When the American Bell Company won their patent infringement suit with Western Union, the Bell companies absorbed the Western Union companies. In Denver, competition for local service would remain absent from the market until 1997.

In 1880, Vaille sold two of his four franchise contracts back to American Bell, who sold them to Horace Tabor in Leadville. In January 1881, Vaille joined a group of Denver business leaders to form the Colorado Telephone Company. Denver Dispatch faded into history when Vaille sold his remaining two Bell contracts to the Colorado Telephone Company. Henry Wolcott was the president of Colorado Telephone, while Vaille stayed on as general manager for three years.

Meanwhile, the Colorado Telephone Company began to grow, as "boomer linemen" strung wire to ranches and farm towns in the flat lands, and to mines and mining towns in the mountains, and along Colorado's front range. Colorado Telephone purchased the Leadville company in 1888.

==== Rocky Mountain Bell - 1883 ====
The Denver Dispatch Company was less than two years old when the Rocky Mountain Telephone Company began in Salt Lake City, Utah, with fewer than 100 subscribers. With the financial backing of American Bell, The Rocky Mountain Bell Telephone Company replaced Rocky Mountain Telephone in 1883. Rocky Mountain Bell immediately began an aggressive campaign to buy nearly every small telephone company in the region, and their operating territory soon covered nearly all of Utah, Montana, Idaho, and Wyoming.

A combination of overspending, careless management, and the logistical difficulties of covering an extremely large, sparsely populated territory would eventually put Rocky Mountain Bell in financial trouble.

==== Mountain States Telephone & Telegraph - 1911 ====
These business practices stopped in July 17, 1911 when Colorado Telephone and Tri-State Telephone merged to form The Mountain States Telephone and Telegraph Company which purchased the Rocky Mountain Bell Telephone Company on July 20, 1911. Vaille was well aware of Rocky Mountain Bell's problems and he insisted that Colorado Telephone Company managers take over the majority of management positions in the former Rocky Mountain Bell Company territory. Vaille served as a Mountain States director until his death in 1920.

A number of Mountain States Telephone & Telegraph buildings survive and are listed on the U.S. National Register of Historic Places.

Mountain Bell logo

MST&T commonly did business as Mountain States Telephone until 1969, when the new Bell System logo came into use and the company began doing business as Mountain Bell. The company provided telephone services in Colorado, Utah, Arizona, New Mexico, Montana, Southern Idaho, Wyoming, and the El Paso, Texas, vicinity. Additionally, MST&T acquired a controlling interest in the Malheur Home Telephone Company in Oregon, better known as Malheur Bell. MST&T operated Malheur Bell as a wholly owned independent subsidiary, an arrangement that continued until 2009.

Mountain Bell's operations in El Paso, Texas, were sold to Southwestern Bell in 1982.

Prior to 1984, AT&T held an 88.6% stake in Mountain Bell.

Usage of the Mountain Bell name has recently been resumed by Unical Enterprises, who began producing telephones under the Mountain Bell name in 2006. Additionally, the MountainBell.com domain is still active and redirects to the CenturyLink webpage.

From 1929 to 1984 the Mountain Bell headquarters was located at 931 14th Street in Denver, Colorado. As part of a company-wide real estate savings effort, areas of the building's interior were remodeled in 2009 and 2010, along with the adjoining 930 building, to accommodate employees vacating leased space in the Qwest headquarters building at 1801 California St. In 2023, Lumen Technologies vacated the former Level 3 Communications headquarters campus in Broomfield, Colorado housing senior leadership and C-level executives offices and relocated them to the Mountain Bell headquarters building after minor interior remodeling.

=== Post-breakup ===
In 1984, the Bell System was broken into seven Regional Bell Operating Companies. US West, Inc. became a holding company for Mountain Bell, Northwestern Bell, and Pacific Northwest Bell.

==== US West Communications ====
US West Communications logo, 1988–2000

In 1988, US West became the first Baby Bell to have its different Bell Operating Companies carry on business under a single name. US West Communications became a "d/b/a" name for Mountain Bell as well as Northwestern Bell and Pacific Northwest Bell; however, the three companies remained legally separate. The three companies also began using the US West Communications logo, which continued to include the Bell logo.

==== Bell Operating Companies merge ====
On January 1, 1991, US West merged its three operating companies. As part of the deal, Northwestern Bell and Pacific Bell were folded into Mountain Bell Mountain States Telephone and Telegraph, the surviving company, changed its name to US West Communications, Inc. on January 2, 1991.

US West Communications was the first local telephone company to offer Caller ID service in 1991, nearly four years before any other local telco could do so. They were the first US telco to upgrade their PSTN to electronic switching before 1990 and they were the first to offer residential and business ISDN and later, DSL services to their customers by 1997.

US West, since 1984, had been selling telephone equipment under the Northwestern Bell name. In 1992, US West granted Unical Enterprises, who had been producing phones under the "La Phone" brand, the right to become the exclusive licensee to produce telephones under the Northwestern Bell name, which are still produced under the BELL Phones by Northwestern Bell Phones brand.

==== Sell-off of rural areas ====
In 1993, US West began selling off unprofitable rural telephone lines throughout its 14-state region. It retained its telephone directory operations in the areas it sold.

In 1993, US West sold off 10 exchanges in Arizona to three buyers. In 1993, Pacific Telecom agreed to purchase 45 exchanges in Colorado serving 50,000 customers. The sale closed in 1994 and the lines were added to Eagle Telecommunications. In 1995, it sold several exchanges in Fremont County, Idaho to Fremont Telcom (which was acquired by FairPoint in the 2000s). The same year, Pacific Telecom acquired more access lines in Oregon and Washington. In 1996 and 1997, several US West Communications exchanges in South Dakota were sold to Golden West Telecommunications. In 1996, Golden West acquired exchanges in Winner, Murdo, Burke, Bonesteel, Marion and Reliance; in 1997, it acquired lines in Clearfield, Gregory, Lesterville, and Witten. The sale included 8,500 access lines. The lines acquired were then added to Golden West's subsidiary Vivian Telephone Company.

In 1999, US West announced plans to sell 530,000 access lines in largely rural areas to the independent company Citizens Communications for $1.65 billion. The sale would not have included US West Dex directories in those territories. The transaction remained incomplete before 2000.

==== Acquisition by Qwest ====
In 2000, Qwest Communications International acquired US West in a hostile takeover. At the time, Global Crossing was trying to acquire US West and Frontier Communications, and US West initially resisted Qwest's takeover. Qwest was a much smaller company in terms of employees and market capitalization but because Qwest's stock was trading at very high prices during the dot-com bubble, it was able to purchase the larger firm, and the Bell Operating Company was renamed Qwest Corporation.

In 2001, Qwest, which acquired US West in 2000, terminated the sale of rural telephone lines agreed upon in 1999 because Citizens refused to complete the transaction.

On December 14, 2009, Qwest Corporation absorbed the operations of its long-time subsidiary Malheur Bell.

==== Acquisition by CenturyLink ====
On April 1, 2011, CenturyLink completed its acquisition of Qwest. At that point, Qwest Corporation became a subsidiary of CenturyLink and began doing business as CenturyLink QC effective August 8, 2011. The merger represents a reunion of exchanges acquired by Pacific Telecom in the 1990s that had been separated from US West Communications.

Qwest Corporation is one of two of the original Bell Operating Companies to be owned by a company not founded in 1983 as a Baby Bell. The other is Frontier West Virginia.

== See also ==
- Northwestern Bell
- Pacific Northwest Bell
