= US West =

American telephone service company (1983–2000)

U S West, Inc.
- Type: Public
- Traded as: NYSE: USW
- Industry: Telecommunications
- Predecessor: AT&T Corporation; Northwestern Bell, Mountain Bell & Pacific Northwest Bell
- Founded: 1983; 43 years ago
- Defunct: June 30, 2000; 26 years ago
- Fate: Merged
- Successor: Qwest
- Headquarters: Denver, Colorado, United States
- Area served: 14 western states
- Parent: AT&T (1983)
- Divisions: Consumer; Business and Government Services; Network; Small Business; Wholesale
- Subsidiaries: U S West Communications; U S West Dex; U S West Information Technologies; U S West Wireless; Time Warner Communications; Time Warner Entertainment (26% stake)

U S West, Inc. was one of seven Regional Bell Operating Companies (RBOCs, also referred to as "Baby Bells"), created in 1983 under the Modification of Final Judgement (United States v. Western Electric Co., Inc. 552 Fed. Supp. 131), a case related to the antitrust breakup of AT&T. U S West provided local telephone and intraLATA long-distance services, data transmission services, cable television services, wireless communications services and related telecommunications products to defined areas in Arizona, Colorado, Idaho, Iowa, Minnesota, Montana, Nebraska, New Mexico, North Dakota, Oregon, South Dakota, Utah, Washington, and Wyoming. U S West was a public company traded on the New York Stock Exchange under the ticker symbol "USW" with headquarters at 1801 California Street in Denver, Colorado.

Until 1990, U S West was a holding company with three Bell Operating Companies: Mountain States Telephone & Telegraph (or Mountain Bell, headquartered in Denver, Colorado); Northwestern Bell, then headquartered in Omaha, Nebraska; and Pacific Northwest Bell, then headquartered in Seattle, Washington. In 1988, the three companies began doing business under the U S West Communications name. On January 1, 1991, Northwestern Bell and Pacific Northwest Bell were legally merged into Mountain Bell which was renamed U S West Communications, Inc. U S West was the first RBOC to consolidate its Bell Operating Companies (the other was BellSouth). Northwestern Bell and Pacific Northwest Bell were not officially defunct, however, until years after the merging.

In 1998, U S West split into two separate companies. Its telephone properties maintained the U S West name, while the remaining assets such as cable, wireless and international businesses became MediaOne. The split was structured so that MediaOne Inc. was the legal successor to U S West Inc., and U S West was the spin-off entity.

U S West merged with Qwest on June 30, 2000, and over time the U S West brand was replaced by the Qwest brand. Qwest merged with CenturyLink on April 1, 2011, and the Qwest brand was replaced by the CenturyLink brand. In 2020, CenturyLink changed its name to Lumen Technologies. In 2026, AT&T completed the purchase of Lumen Technologies' mass-market broadband connectivity business, leaving Lumen Technologies to concentrate on serving only medium to large enterprises.

== Accomplishments ==
US West became a pioneer in the introduction and rapid system-wide implementation of telephone technologies designed by Bellcore (now iconectiv) in the 1980s and 1990s. Their lead in this push became one that many other Regional Bell Operating Companies had to scramble to keep up with.

US West's success in this endeavor was for multiple reasons which included their then-innovative use of "test-markets" for staggered roll-outs of new calling features in middle-sized cities such as Boise, Idaho; Minneapolis, Minnesota; and Phoenix, Arizona before releasing them on a wider scale (it was the first communications provider to use this strategy called beta-testing, a term used for many years in the software development industry). Their geographic presence featured telephone switching equipment that had been constructed fairly recent to the time frame, thereby requiring fewer upgrades. Their service area was also experiencing population growth at a tremendous rate, tripling its subscriber-base in a short time and increasing revenues.

US West also had ownership in the cable industry with its 1994 purchase of Atlanta-based Wometco and GTC cable operations and the subsequent purchase of Continental Cablevision, creating MediaOne Group Inc. MediaOne, along with several ancillary businesses, was spun off as a separate company in 1998 from the traditional phone operations to form MediaOne Group. US West also participated in a joint venture agreement with Time Warner Cable to form Time Warner Communications (later known as TW Telecom) in 1993- it also purchased a 26% stake in Time Warner Entertainment's entertainment operations including Warner Bros. and HBO, which was passed to MediaOne, AT&T, and finally Comcast. Comcast sold the stake back to Time Warner Inc. in 2003.

US West Communications was the first local telephone company to offer Caller ID service in 1991, nearly four years before any other local telco could do so. They were the first U.S. telco to upgrade their PSTN to electronic switching before 1990 and they were the first to offer residential and business ISDN and later, DSL services to their customers by 1997.

As a result of its rapid "bring-to-market" abilities and continued success in technological advancements, the company adopted the slogan "Life's better here." developed by ad agency NW Ayer.

US West was one of the first companies in the United States to officially recognize and support its gay and lesbian employees. The Eagles, an employee resource group for gay and lesbian US West employees, was recognized in 1989. It had chapters in seven US states by 1990.

== Criticisms ==
US West was accused by critics of failing to meet service needs within a reasonable time frame and of practicing predatory billing and collection methods. While the company often claimed that subscriber demands were often greater than its ability to fulfill orders, many critics pointed to high profit margins, spending on bring-to-market technology and lackluster investment in customer support.

US West went through a period of union-management relations that bordered on positive during the early 1990s. After a failed re-engineering strategy, relations fell apart due to increasing hostility between company leaders and employees. An often-used nickname for the company was "US Worst." When the company rolled out its new slogan – "Life's better here" – employees began wearing buttons and shirts that stated that "Life's Bitter Here".

The company was fined multiple times by the State of Oregon for these practices during the 1990s. US West was also, at several times, involved in smaller litigation with other states within its service area for similar complaints from customers.

Qwest, MCI, and smaller competitive local exchange carriers (CLECs) who had recently been allowed to offer local service within US West's service area (as a result of the Telecommunications Act of 1996) complained to the Federal Communications Commission (FCC) that US West was uncooperative in releasing its owned lines to these new companies. These types of complaints landed US West in court yet again, offering the complex question of whether or not the government could legally offer the sale of owned property to other companies in the event of deregulation.

== Merger with Qwest ==
In 1996, reports appearing in The Denver Post and the Rocky Mountain News revealed that CLECs had lodged complaints with the FCC against US West, including multiple complaints from Qwest Communications International, Inc. The complaints alleged US West neglected or seriously delayed release of "bundled loops" as required by the Telecommunications Act of 1996, making it difficult for competitors to provide local telephone service to their customers. Other competitors began following suit, and charged US West with monopoly-like or anti-trust type behavior.

During the winter of 1999–2000, US West announced that it had received an unsolicited purchase offer from Qwest Communications International, Inc. for $44 billion. At the time, US West had been attempting to merge with Global Crossing, because the offer from Qwest was for a higher value, the US West Board accepted it.

On June 30, 2000, US West, Inc. and Qwest Communications International, Inc. combined via merger. Qwest Communications International, Inc. was merged into US West and renamed Qwest with all of US West's direct subsidiaries becoming direct subsidiaries of Qwest.

After the merger, the Bell Operating Company subsidiary was renamed from US West Communications, Inc. to Qwest Corporation and other subsidiaries were similarly renamed to reflect the Qwest name.

After Qwest was acquired by CenturyLink in 2011, the Qwest brand was replaced by the CenturyLink brand. Subsidiaries, with the exception of Qwest Management Company (founded as US West Investment Management Company), which became CenturyLink Investment Management Company, retained the Qwest name and adopted d/b/a names.
