= Qwest =

Defunct American corporation

Qwest Communications International Inc.
- Logo used from 1996 to 2011

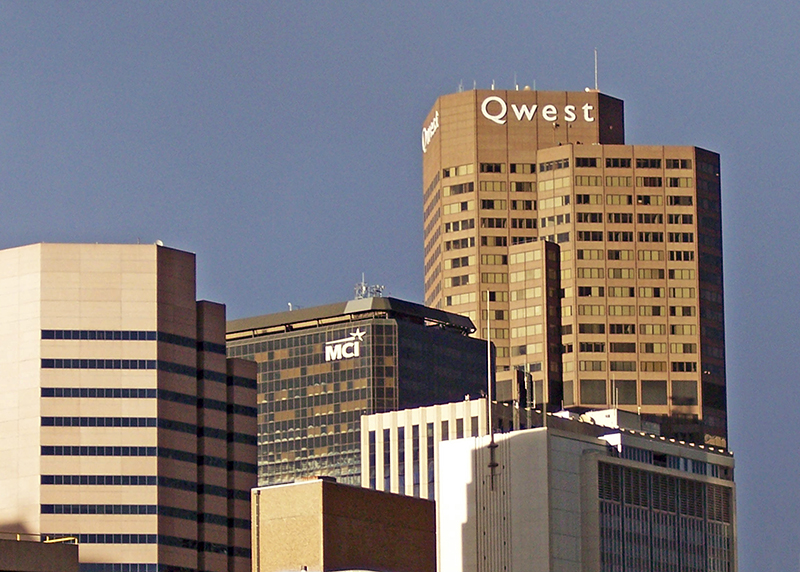
- Qwest's headquarters in Denver, Colorado
- Type: Subsidiary
- Traded as: NYSE: Q
- Industry: Telecommunications
- Predecessor: US West
- Founded: 1996; 30 years ago
- Founder: Phillip Anschutz
- Defunct: August 1, 2011; 15 years ago
- Fate: Merged with CenturyLink
- Headquarters: 1801 California Street, Denver, Colorado, U.S.
- Area served: International
- Services: Telephone; Internet; Television
- Revenue: ▼$13.778 billion (2007)
- Operating income: ▲$1.730 billion (2007)
- Net income: ▲$2.917 billion (2007)
- Total assets: ▲$22.532 billion (2007)
- Total equity: ▲$563 million (2007)
- Number of employees: 30,000 (2010)
- Parent: CenturyLink (2011)
- Subsidiaries: Qwest Corporation
- Website: www.qwest.com

Qwest Communications International, Inc. was a United States telecommunications carrier. Qwest provided local service in 14 western and midwestern U.S. states: Arizona, Colorado, Idaho, Indiana, Iowa, Minnesota, Montana, Nebraska, New Mexico, North Dakota, Oregon, South Dakota, Texas, Utah, Washington, and Wyoming.

On April 22, 2010, CenturyLink announced it would acquire Qwest in a stock transaction. The merger closed on April 1, 2011. Qwest began doing business as CenturyLink in August 2011. Between 1999 and 2002, Qwest became involved in a major accounting scandal. The U.S. Securities and Exchange Commission alleged that the company fraudulently recognized more than $3.8 billion in revenue, excluded $231 million in expenses and made false statements that substantially inflated its share price. The SEC alleged that the inflated stock enabled Qwest to complete its acquisition of US West. Qwest subsequently paid a $250 million SEC penalty, while former chief executive Joseph Nacchio was convicted of 19 counts of insider trading.

Qwest provided voice, Internet backbone data services, and digital television in some areas. It operated in three segments: Wireline Services, Wireless Services, and Other Services. The Wireline Services segment provided local voice, long-distance voice, and data and Internet (DSL) services to consumers, businesses, and wholesale customers, as well as access services to wholesale customers. The Wireless Services segment was achieved by a partnership with Verizon Wireless. Qwest also partnered with DirecTV to provide digital television service to its customers. In Phoenix, Denver, Salt Lake City, Boise, and Omaha, Qwest offered Qwest Choice TV (later also known as Qwest Digital Television), an IPTV service over DSL. This service was retired in October 2008 (after being no longer available to new customers in May 2008), leaving DirecTV as the only TV service Qwest provided. Qwest Choice TV customers were moved to DirecTV. The Other Services segment primarily involved the sublease of real estate assets, such as space in office buildings, warehouses, and other properties.

Qwest Communications also provided long-distance services and broadband data, as well as voice and video communications globally. The company sold its products and services to small businesses, governmental entities, and public and private educational institutions through various channels, including direct-sales marketing, telemarketing, arrangements with third-party agents, company's Web site, and partnership relations. As of September 13, 2005, Qwest had 98 retail stores in 14 states. Qwest Communications was headquartered in Denver, Colorado at 1801 California Street, in the second tallest building in Denver at 53 stories. The majority of Qwest occupational or non-management employees were represented by two labor unions; the Communications Workers of America and in Montana, the International Brotherhood of Electrical Workers. Qwest also had software development centers in Bangalore and Noida (New Delhi), India called Qwest Software Services.

== History ==
=== Founding ===
Founded in 1996 by Philip Anschutz, Qwest began in an unconventional way. Anschutz, who owned the Southern Pacific Transportation Company at the time, established the subsidiary Southern Pacific Telecommunications Company and began installing the first all-digital, fiber-optic infrastructure along his railroad lines and connecting them into central junctions in strategic locations to serve businesses with high-speed data and T1 services. In 1997, the Southern Pacific Transportation Company merged with Union Pacific, but the telecom assets were kept separate from the railroad merger with Union Pacific. The telecom company was renamed Qwest and became a publicly traded company in June 1997.

Qwest Communications grew aggressively, acquiring internet service provider SuperNet in 1997, followed by the acquisition of LCI, a low cost long-distance carrier (located in Dublin, Ohio and McLean, Virginia) in 1998, and followed again by the acquisition of Icon CMT, a web hosting provider and European-based EUnet International Ltd., also in 1998. This launched Qwest as not only a provider of high speed data to the niche market of corporate customers, but also a quick-growing residential and business long-distance customer base that it quickly merged into its data service.

=== US West acquisition ===
USWEST Corporate Logo, 1984–2000

Qwest merged with "Baby Bell" US West on June 30, 2000 through an apparent hostile takeover for $48 billion. Philip Anschutz owned 17.5% of the resulting company. Unlike prior merger transactions between the Baby Bells, US West ceased to exist when it was immediately absorbed into Qwest with all subsidiaries of US West becoming directly owned by Qwest.

As a condition of the merger, Qwest was required to sell off its long-distance operations in the 14-state boundary in which it provided local telephone services. They were eventually sold to Touch America. In 2003, Qwest acquired Touch America from 360networks after Touch America filed for bankruptcy. The acquisition ended ongoing disputes between the two companies in which Touch America alleged Qwest continued to illegally sell long-distance services within the former US West region.

=== Directory operations sale ===
In 2002, Qwest agreed to sell its directory operations, QwestDex, to private equity firms The Carlyle Group and Welsh, Carson, Anderson & Stowe for $7 billion. The sale allowed Qwest to generate cash to fend off a bankruptcy filing to which it may have had to resort due to significant amounts of debt it had incurred since the collapse of the dot-com bubble. The resulting company was named Dex Media, when the sale was completed in 2004.

=== Alliances ===
Qwest Communications has partnered with other major communications companies during its history.

In Europe, Qwest partnered with the Dutch national telecom operator KPN to create the pan-European data communications and hosting company KPNQwest. KPNQwest was formed in November 1998 and went on to launch an initial public offering on the Nasdaq and Amsterdam stock Exchanges in November 1999. KPNQwest collapsed in bankruptcy in 2002.

In the US, Qwest partnered with AT&T and Verizon to form Movearoo.com. Created on July 9, 2008, the website is a program designed to help customers in the process of moving find home service providers available in their area.

== Problems ==
=== Customer complaints and consumer issues ===
One of the historically significant mass complaints regarding Qwest involved allegations that the then-long-distance-only company switched local telephone service customers over to Qwest's long-distance service without their permission, an illegal practice known as slamming. In July 2000, Qwest paid a $1.5 million fine to the Federal Communications Commission to resolve slamming complaints. In April 2001, they paid a $350,000 fine to the Pennsylvania Bureau of Consumer Protection after the state cited them for deceptive advertising and slamming practices. The company's settlements included a requirement that all of its sales employees sign a pledge stating that slamming was barred and a condition for dismissal from Qwest employment.

== Legal and regulatory history ==
=== Accounting fraud ===
==== Revenue-recognition scheme ====
Between 1999 and 2002, Qwest engaged in a series of accounting practices intended to make its declining telecommunications-services business appear to be achieving double-digit growth. According to the U.S. Securities and Exchange Commission (SEC), senior management relied heavily on non-recurring sales of fiber-optic capacity and equipment while describing much of the resulting revenue to investors as recurring communications-services revenue.

The SEC alleged that Qwest fraudulently recognized approximately $3.8 billion in revenue and excluded $231 million in expenses. Other accounting errors included a $56 million overstatement of operator-services revenue, $200 million in improperly capitalized costs and an $850 million understatement of expenses connected with the US West merger and restructuring charges.

Qwest also entered transactions involving fiber capacity and equipment in which non-recurring revenue was used to meet quarterly projections. The SEC alleged that the company made false or misleading statements concerning its network, strategic relationships, executive compensation and the source and quality of its reported growth.

==== Effect on the US West acquisition ====
Qwest entered an agreement to acquire US West in July 1999. Because the transaction was financed with Qwest shares, a sustained decline in Qwest's stock price could have allowed US West to terminate the agreement. The SEC alleged that Qwest management placed intense pressure on employees to meet earnings projections and prevent the share price from falling further.

When the merger closed in June 2000, Qwest stock was trading above $50 a share. The SEC subsequently described the Qwest shares used in the transaction as a currency that had been significantly inflated by the company's false and misleading statements. A later SEC complaint stated that approximately $40 billion of Qwest securities were issued in connection with the merger and that the fraudulent scheme kept Qwest's stock price high enough to allow the transaction to be completed.

After the accounting problems emerged, Qwest's market capitalization fell from approximately $91 billion to $1.9 billion. Its share price, which had exceeded $60 in 2000, declined to approximately $1 by 2002. The company ultimately restated approximately $2.2 billion in revenue.

=== Government enforcement and criminal proceedings ===
In October 2004, Qwest agreed to pay a $250 million civil penalty to resolve the SEC's enforcement action. The settlement also required the company to maintain a permanent chief compliance officer responsible for compliance with federal securities laws.

In March 2005, the SEC filed related civil actions against former chief executive Joseph Nacchio and eight other former Qwest officers and employees. The SEC alleged that the disclosure fraud had been directed at the highest levels of the company.

Nacchio was indicted in December 2005 on 42 counts of insider trading arising from approximately $101 million in stock sales. In April 2007, a jury convicted him on 19 counts involving $52 million in sales and acquitted him on the remaining 23 counts. Following appeals and resentencing, Nacchio received a 70-month prison sentence, a $19 million fine and an order requiring him to forfeit approximately $44 million.

=== Investor settlements ===
Shareholders and pension funds filed numerous securities-fraud actions alleging that Qwest and its executives had inflated the company's reported results and share price. In 2009, a federal judge granted final approval to combined settlements totaling $695 million. That amount included approximately $445 million funded by Qwest, insurance proceeds and former executives, together with the $250 million SEC recovery fund.

In 2012, the United States Department of Justice distributed approximately $44 million forfeited by Nacchio to 112,210 investors who had purchased Qwest securities during the fraud period.

=== Later litigation involving Qwest Corporation ===
The operating company named Qwest Corporation, which survived as a subsidiary of Lumen Technologies, was later named in litigation distinct from the historical Qwest Communications International accounting scandal.

In 2021, Phone Recovery Services filed an action on behalf of the State of New Mexico alleging that Qwest Corporation and CenturyTel of the Southwest had violated the New Mexico Fraud Against Taxpayers Act by failing to bill, collect and remit certain 911 surcharges beginning in 2004. A jury decided all remaining claims in Lumen's favor in August 2024. According to Lumen's 2024 annual report, the plaintiff appealed and Lumen filed a cross-appeal concerning earlier rulings on dismissal and summary judgment.

== Refusal of NSA surveillance requests ==
In May 2006, USA Today reported that millions of telephone calling records had been handed over to the United States National Security Agency by AT&T Corp., Verizon, and BellSouth since September 11, 2001. This data has been used to create a database of all international and domestic calls. Qwest was allegedly the lone holdout, despite threats from the NSA that their refusal to cooperate may jeopardize future government contracts, a decision which has earned them praise from those who oppose the NSA program.

In the case of ACLU v. NSA, U.S. District Judge Anna Diggs Taylor on August 17, 2006 ruled that the government's domestic eavesdropping program is unconstitutional and ordered it ended immediately. The Bush Administration filed an appeal in the case, and Judge Taylor's decision was overturned by the appeals court on the basis of a lack of standing.

Former Qwest CEO Joseph Nacchio alleged in appeal documents that the NSA requested that Qwest participate in its wiretapping program more than six months before September 11, 2001. Nacchio recalled the meeting as occurring on February 27, 2001. Nacchio further claimed that the NSA cancelled a lucrative contract with Qwest as a result of Qwest's refusal to participate in the wiretapping program. On April 14, 2009, Nacchio surrendered to a federal prison camp in Schuylkill, Pennsylvania, to begin serving a six-year sentence for an insider trading conviction. The United States Supreme Court denied bail pending appeal the same day.

A social media experiment and website covering the Qwest holdout, "Thank you Qwest dot Org" built by Netherlands-based webmaster Richard Kastelein and American expatriate journalist Chris Floyd, was covered by the CNN Situation Room, USA Today, New York Times, International Herald Tribune, Denver Post, News.com, and the Salt Lake Tribune.

== Merger with CenturyLink ==
On April 22, 2010, CenturyLink announced it would acquire Qwest in a transaction of 0.1664 shares of CenturyLink common stock for each share of Qwest common stock. CenturyLink shareholders would hold a 50.5% share of ownership in the combined company, while Qwest shareholders would own the remaining 49.5%. The valuation of CenturyLink's purchase as of April 21, 2010, was $22.4 billion, including the assumption of $11.8 billion of outstanding debt held by Qwest as of December 31, 2009. Qwest started to do business as CenturyLink from August 8, 2011.

== Corporate structure ==
Qwest Communications International, Inc. was the holding company. It was the parent company of many more entities, but those listed below were the main operating units:

- Qwest Corporation was an incumbent local exchange carrier (ILEC), and since it was part of the AT&T Bell Operating System as Mountain Bell, it is also a Bell Operating Company. Qwest Corporation serves an in-region local market which consists of the 14 states in which the pre-merger US West provided local telephone service. Qwest Corporation also provides administrative and operation services such as financial, human resources, IT, and legal to the Qwest family of companies—the Qwest affiliates. It also owns El Paso County Telephone.
- Qwest L D Corp. was a subsidiary providing long-distance calling services within the Qwest Corporation operating boundaries.
- Qwest Communications Company, LLC was an affiliate of Qwest that currently provides long-distance telephone and long-haul data services. It was the classic pre-US West-merger entity founded in 1996. Qwest Communications Corporation changed its name and corporate status on January 2, 2009, to a limited liability company. Qwest Communications made an agreement with CSX in which it could use its rail lines as a right-of-way for a fiber-optic system. Qwest Communications International, the holding company, took the slogan Ride the Light as a result of this.

=== Defunct entities ===
- Malheur Home Telephone Company: Commonly known as Malheur Bell, it was merged into its corporate parent Qwest Corporation on December 14, 2009.
- Qwest Interprise America: Merged into Qwest Service Corporation in 2007 then moved to Qwest Communications Company, LLC.
- Qwest Services Corporation: While still a legal entity, it previously supplied the administrative and operation services Qwest Corporation currently provides.
- Qwest Cyber.Solutions: Operated as an application service provider (ASP) in the late 1990s and early 2000s (decade) hosting, managing and integrating complex software offerings such as SAP, Oracle and JD Edwards.

== See also ==
- Qwest Wireless
