= Joseph B. Foraker =

American politician and military officer (1846–1917)

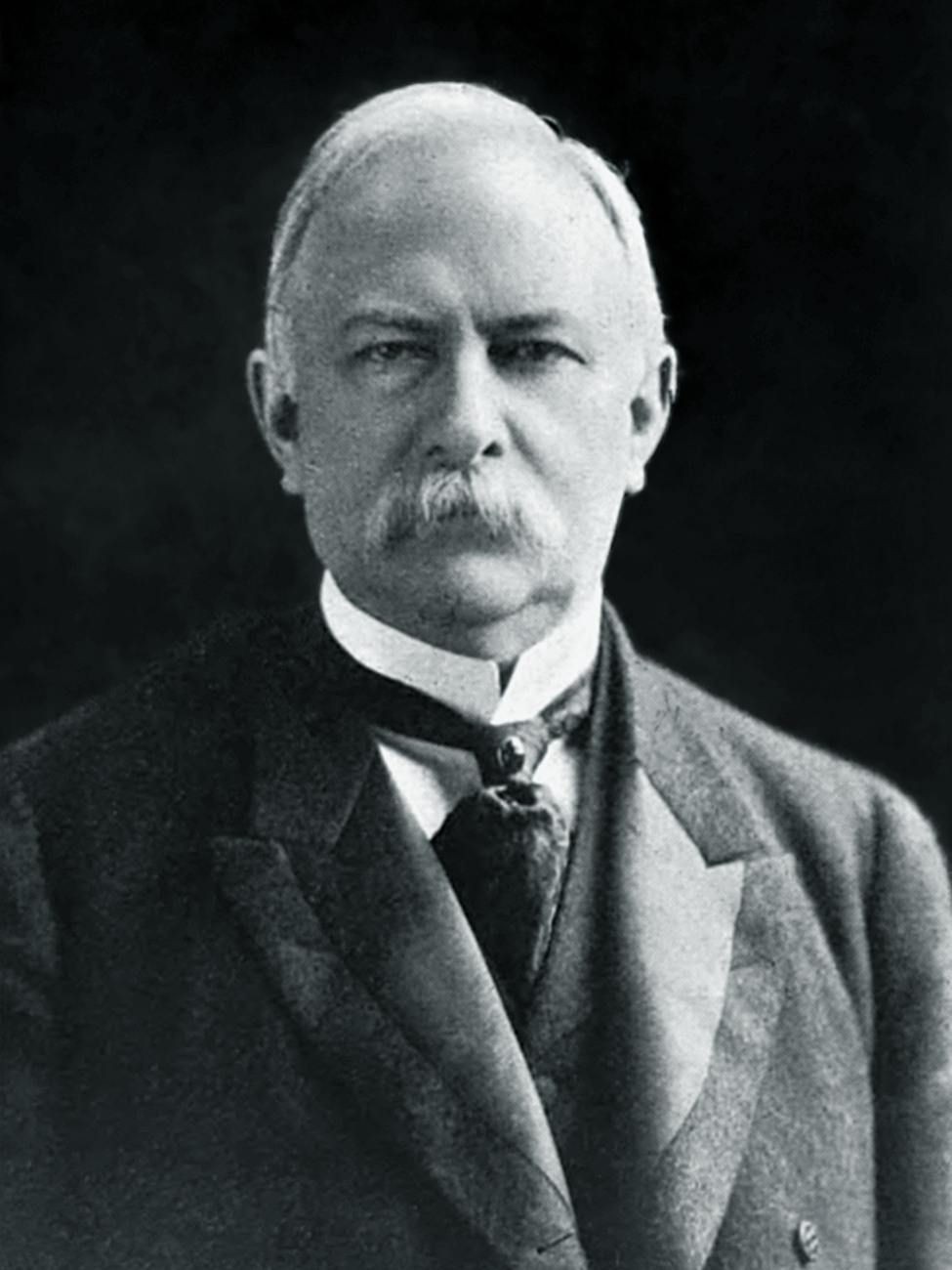
- Foraker c. 1903

United States Senator from Ohio
- In office March 4, 1897 – March 3, 1909
- Preceded by: Calvin S. Brice
- Succeeded by: Theodore E. Burton

37th Governor of Ohio
- In office January 11, 1886 – January 13, 1890
- Lieutenant: Robert P. Kennedy (1886–1887); Silas A. Conrad (1887–1888); William C. Lyon (1888–1890)
- Preceded by: George Hoadly
- Succeeded by: James E. Campbell

Personal details
- Born: Joseph Benson Foraker; July 5, 1846 Highland County, Ohio, U.S.
- Died: May 10, 1917 (aged 70) Cincinnati, Ohio, U.S.
- Resting place: Spring Grove Cemetery
- Party: Republican
- Spouse: Julia A. P. Bundy (m. 1870)
- Children: 5
- Education: Ohio Wesleyan University; Cornell University (BA)
- Profession: Politician; lawyer
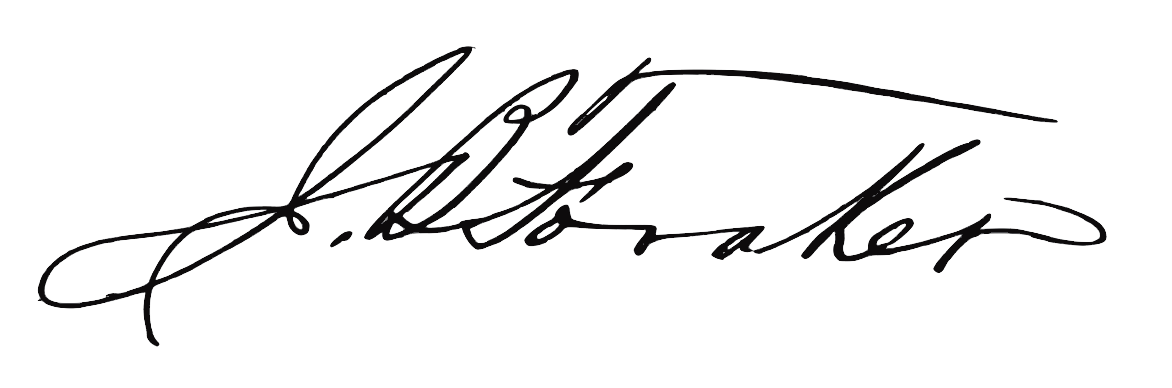
- Signature
- Nickname: Fire Alarm Joe

Military service
- Allegiance: United States
- Branch/service: U.S. Army (Union Army)
- Years of service: July 14, 1862 – June 13, 1865
- Rank: Captain
- Unit: 89th Ohio Infantry

Joseph Benson Foraker (July 5, 1846 – May 10, 1917) was an American politician of the Republican Party who served as the 37th governor of Ohio from 1886 to 1890 and as a United States senator from Ohio from 1897 until 1909.

Foraker was born in rural Ohio; he enlisted at age 16 in the Union Army during the American Civil War. He fought for almost three years, attaining the rank of captain. After the war, he was a member of Cornell University's first graduating class, and became a lawyer. He was elected a judge in 1879 and became known as a political speaker. He was defeated in his first run for the governorship in 1883, but was elected two years later. As Ohio governor, he built an alliance with the Republican Party "boss" Mark Hanna, but fell out with him in 1888. Foraker was defeated for reelection in 1889, but was elected U.S. senator by the Ohio General Assembly in 1896, after an unsuccessful bid for that office in 1892.

In the Senate, he supported the Spanish–American War and the annexation of the Philippines and Puerto Rico; the Foraker Act gave Puerto Rico its first civil government under American rule. He came to differ with President Theodore Roosevelt over railroad regulation and political patronage. Their largest disagreement was over the Brownsville Affair, in which black soldiers were accused of terrorizing a Texas town, and Roosevelt dismissed the entire battalion. Foraker zealously opposed Roosevelt's actions as unfair, and fought for the soldiers' reinstatement. The two men's disagreement broke out into an angry confrontation at the 1907 Gridiron Dinner, after which Roosevelt worked to defeat Foraker's re-election bid. Foraker died in 1917; in 1972, the Army reversed the dismissals and cleared the soldiers. Mount Foraker, the second highest peak in the Alaska Range, and the third highest peak in the United States, was named for him in 1899.

== Early life and career ==
=== Boyhood and Civil War ===
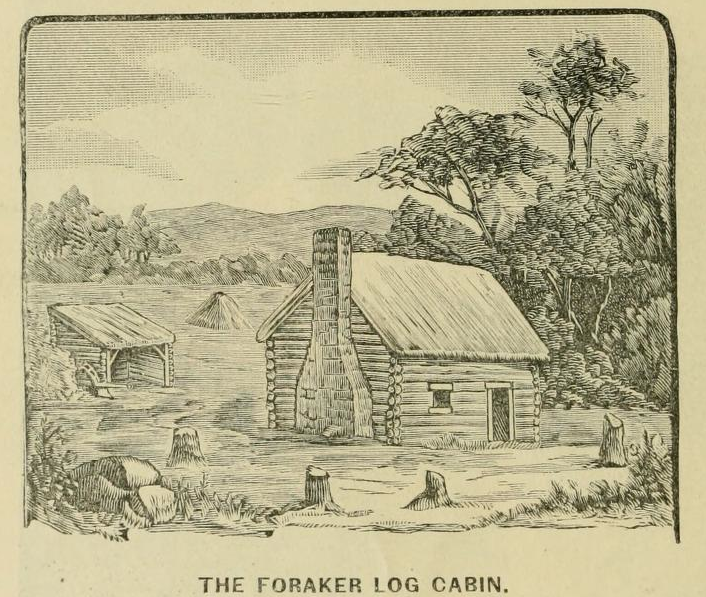
Depiction of Foraker's "birthplace" from an 1883 campaign biography

Joseph Benson Foraker was born on July 5, 1846, on a farm about one mile (1.6 km) north of Rainsboro, Ohio, in Highland County. He was the son of Henry and Margaret (Reece) Foraker, and one of 11 children, of whom nine reached adulthood. The house in which Joseph Foraker was born was a comfortable two-story residence; his later campaign publications often depicted it as a log cabin. When Joseph was age 2, David Reece died, and the Foraker family purchased the mill and adjacent farm. There, Joseph grew up as a typical farm boy. He received little formal education, attending the local school for three or four months each winter. Nevertheless, he acquired a taste for military history, and a gift for speaking. At age 10, he became an adherent of the newly formed Republican Party. Four years later, he supported the Republican candidate, former Illinois representative Abraham Lincoln, in the 1860 presidential race, marching in processions of the Wide Awakes and other pro-Lincoln groups, and attending as many rallies as he could. Impressed enough by one speaker to follow him to a neighboring town, he learned not to make the same speech twice in two days—at least, not in venues close to each other.

In October 1861, Foraker left his parents' home to go to the county seat of Hillsboro where he was to live with his uncle, James Reece, auditor of Highland County, and work as a clerk in his office. He was sent to replace his older brother, Burch, by then enlisted in the Union Army as the American Civil War was raging. Foraker noted in his memoirs that while his time as auditor's clerk greatly improved his penmanship, it also brought him into contact with many county officials, teaching him how government worked. The young clerk was impressed by his brother's letters home, and was anxious to join the army despite his young age. Soon after his 16th birthday, Joseph Foraker learned that a family friend was organizing a volunteer company, and sought to enlist. His uncle gave reluctant consent, and on July 14, 1862, Foraker was mustered in Company "A", 89th Ohio Volunteer Infantry; in late August, after training, he became second sergeant. With Confederate forces moving through Kentucky and threatening Cincinnati, the 89th was hurried into defenses set up across the Ohio River in Newport, Kentucky. The Confederates did not reach the Ohio, having been forced back well to the south, and the 89th moved to Fort Shaler, near Newport. While Foraker was at Fort Shaler, President Lincoln issued the Emancipation Proclamation; Foraker recounted in his memoirs that he and his comrades felt that the proclamation meant that they were fighting for the end of slavery, not just to preserve the Union.

Later in September 1862, the 89th was sent to Western Virginia (today West Virginia) to reinforce Union forces there, and joined in their advance for a month. The regiment settled into winter quarters, but was called out for transport to Tennessee, where it helped relieve Fort Donelson in February 1863. Before this action, Foraker had seen little fighting, and the bloody scenes there were a shock to him; he wrote his parents, "To know how dreadful war is you must see it yourself." The 89th remained at Donelson only a few days before being sent to join the Army of the Cumberland under the command of Major General William Rosecrans near Carthage; there, Foraker was promoted to second lieutenant. In June, Foraker led an advance guard that clashed with the Confederate rear in what developed into the Battle of Hoover's Gap, and the Union forces slowly advanced across Tennessee, reaching Chattanooga in September. From Chattanooga, Foraker and two other officers were sent home to collect new soldiers who were expected to be drafted, but the plan to draft recruits was abandoned due to political opposition. In November he returned to Chattanooga, where the 89th was now part of the Army of the Tennessee under Brigadier General William Tecumseh Sherman, in time to fight in the Battle of Missionary Ridge.

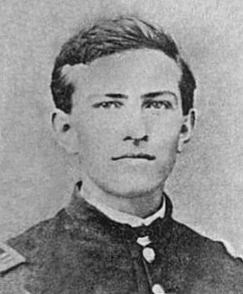
Foraker as a captain in the Union Army

In May 1864, Sherman began his Atlanta campaign. Foraker fought in several fierce battles in that campaign, including Resaca, New Hope Church, and Kennesaw Mountain. Atlanta, or at least what was left of it after devastating fires, fell on September 2. Foraker was detailed to the Signal Corps school that had been set up by the army at Atlanta, and spent a month there. He was then assigned to Major General Henry W. Slocum's division, and remained with that division as it participated in Sherman's March to the Sea, leaving a swath of destruction behind. In late December 1864, the army reached Savannah, and Foraker, despite a storm, was able to communicate with US Navy ships offshore to alert them to the presence of Sherman's army. After a month, the army marched north into South Carolina, determined to bring even more devastation to the state that had first seceded. Foraker was in charge of maintaining signals between the wings of the army, and was stationed on a gunboat as it moved up the Savannah River. He saw more active duty as a courier between Sherman's main army and Slocum's forces in March 1865 as they met Confederate forces in North Carolina in the Battle of Bentonville. On the day of the battle, March 19, 1865, Foraker was promoted to brevet captain, and was soon thereafter made aide-de-camp to General Slocum. In April, as Sherman's army moved slowly northward, word came of the surrender of Confederate general Robert E. Lee and his forces at Appomattox, Virginia, effectively ending the war. In early May, Sherman's Army of Georgia journeyed north towards Washington, passing in review on May 23 before President Andrew Johnson, sworn in after Lincoln's assassination the previous month. Foraker soon returned to Ohio, and was mustered out.

=== Education and early career ===
Foraker had been anxious to become a lawyer while a clerk for his uncle; with peace restored he enrolled for a year at Salem Academy and then in 1866 Ohio Wesleyan University in Delaware, Ohio. He found the students who had not served in the army to be immature. He took the usual course, mostly of classics, with a few classes in the sciences, and registered as a clerk for a local attorney. Foraker courted Julia Bundy, daughter of Congressman Hezekiah S. Bundy and a student at nearby Ohio Wesleyan Female College; the two married in 1870. In 1868, he learned that newly founded Cornell University in Ithaca, New York, was offering entrance by examination to students willing to transfer. Along with fellow Ohio Wesleyan students Morris Lyon Buchwalter and John Andrew Rea, Foraker enrolled at Cornell; the three founded the first New York State chapter of Phi Kappa Psi fraternity, and in 1869 graduated as part of Cornell's inaugural class of eight students. Foraker, in later years, served as a trustee of Cornell, elected by his fellow alumni.

After graduating from Cornell, Foraker moved to Cincinnati, where he resumed his study of law with a local firm; he was admitted to the bar in October 1869. Foraker's first job in the legal profession was as a notary public; he wrote in his memoirs how time-consuming depositions were in the days before typewriters. Foraker wrote that he earned $600 in his first year as a lawyer, but by the fourth year was earning $2,700; "after that it was easy".

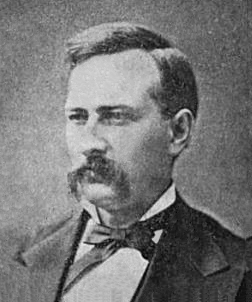
Foraker as judge of the Superior Court of Cincinnati (1879 to 1882)

The Forakers lived in a boarding house on Elm Street in Cincinnati for two years after their wedding in 1870. They then moved to a house in the suburb of Norwood and in 1879 built a home in upscale Mount Auburn. Joseph Foraker had initially intended to concentrate on his law practice, but in the early 1870s became a well-regarded speaker for the Republicans. In 1872, Foraker campaigned for President Ulysses S. Grant's successful re-election bid. In 1875, he was for the first time a delegate to the Republican state convention, supporting fellow Cincinnatian Alphonso Taft for governor. However, Taft was defeated for the nomination by the incumbent, Rutherford B. Hayes, who that fall broke Ohio precedent by winning a third two-year term. The following year, Foraker attended the 1876 Republican National Convention as a spectator, and listened spellbound as Robert Ingersoll dramatically nominated Maine Senator James G. Blaine for president, calling him a "plumed knight". While Ingersoll's speech gained Blaine a lasting nickname, it did not procure him the nomination, which fell to Governor Hayes. Foraker supported Hayes, who was elected that fall in a close and controversial election.

In 1876, Foraker ran for judge of the Court of Common Pleas. Election fraud by Democratic political boss Eph Howard defeated Foraker and the rest of the Republican ticket. In 1878, he ran for state's attorney for Hamilton County (where Cincinnati is located) but was defeated in another Democratic sweep. In 1879, Foraker won his first elective office, as judge of the Superior Court of Cincinnati. He served three years of a five-year term, resigning in 1882 due to an illness, though he recovered after several months' rest.

In 1881 Foraker became a charter member of the Ohio Commandery of the Military Order of the Loyal Legion of the United States (MOLLUS) - a military society of veteran officers of the Union armed forces and their descendants. He was assigned national insignia number 2179 and Ohio Commandery number 21.

=== Seeking the governorship (1883–1885) ===
In 1883, Governor Charles Foster, a Republican who had held the office since 1880, looked for a Republican contender to succeed him. Foster had sought increased regulation of the liquor trade, offending many German-Americans, who were deemed likely to vote Democratic in reaction, and who were especially concentrated in Cincinnati. Few expected the Republicans to retain the governorship, and prominent candidates such as Senator John Sherman and Congressman Benjamin Butterworth declined to run. Foster saw Foraker as a candidate likely to do well: he was a Civil War veteran with a good record as a lawyer and a promising public speaker—and his Cincinnati residence might win back some votes. Others agreed; the local United States attorney wrote to Senator Sherman that the Republicans should nominate "Foraker or some other unobjectionable man". Foster accordingly wrote to Foraker, offering him the chance at "honorable distinction and useful service." Foraker came to Columbus just before the 1883 state convention, and sounded out state Republican leaders such as Sherman and Congressman William McKinley. When Foraker found them willing to support him, he allowed his name to be placed in nomination, and once it was clear that Sherman would not run, the convention nominated Foraker by acclamation. The Democratic Cincinnati Enquirer summed up the Republican strategy: "They determined to sacrifice as little as possible, so they sacrificed Foraker."

The Democrats nominated George Hoadly, another Cincinnatian, with whom Foraker was friendly. The major issue in the campaign was alcohol—the legislature had passed a law authorizing localities to license saloons, and had authorized two referendums to allow additional regulation. Hoadly, though ill for part of the campaign with malaria, deftly maneuvered the politically inexperienced Foraker into stating that he would not vote for the referendums. This offended "dry" Republicans, splitting the party. Foraker campaigned throughout the state, reaching nearly every county and generally speaking at least twice a day. Nevertheless, he was defeated by over 12,000 votes, losing most counties, including Hamilton; according to Foraker biographer Everett Walters, "although defeated in this campaign, Foraker gained by it; he won political repute through the state; no longer was he an 'unknown.'" One reason cited for Foraker's defeat was a failure to appeal to blacks, who constituted about two percent of Ohio's population and who then mostly voted Republican.

Foraker returned to the practice of law, initially vowing to avoid politics; however, he received a number of letters offering him support in a gubernatorial race in 1885. The 1884 Republican state convention elected Foraker a delegate-at-large to the national convention along with Congressman McKinley and Cleveland industrialist Mark Hanna. Sherman's political managers asked Foraker to play an active role in Sherman's presidential campaign, and to place his name in nomination at the convention, which he did, though Walters describes his speech as "weak and unimpressive" by comparison with Foraker's later efforts. Other candidates for the presidential nomination included President Chester A. Arthur (who had succeeded the assassinated James A. Garfield) and John A. Logan, but the convention was dominated by the Blaine forces. Sherman received 30 votes, mostly from Ohio, on the first ballot, but his total thereafter declined, and Blaine secured the nomination on the fourth ballot. There was talk of Foraker for vice president; he received one vote, from New York delegate and Cornell president Andrew D. White. The nominating speech made Foraker a national figure. At the convention, Foraker worked with Hanna and with Charles G. Kurtz of Columbus: both supported Foraker in the years ahead, though in the case of Hanna, only for a time. In the fall campaign, both Foraker and Hanna supported Blaine, accompanying the New Englander when he toured Ohio in October. However, Blaine was defeated by the Democratic candidate, New York governor Grover Cleveland.

Foraker received early support for a second run for governor in 1885, but said little publicly until the state convention in Springfield in June. He did, however, respond to allegations that he had discriminated against blacks in his law practice and that he had withdrawn from Ohio Wesleyan because a black student had been admitted. Foraker refuted these charges. He arrived at the convention to the strains of "Marching Through Georgia", in reference to his Civil War service, and won an easy first-ballot victory: according to Walters, "the Springfield convention of 1885 marked the arrival of Foraker, the politician." The major issues in the fall campaign were again the liquor question, at which Foraker proved more adept than two years previously, and treatment of the black voter, prompted by an incident in Cincinnati in 1884 when a Democratic-minded policeman, Mike Mullen, locked up 150 blacks the night before the general election to prevent them from voting. Foraker was again opposed by Hoadly, who had pardoned Mullen, and who had accepted a $150,000 fee from the city-owned Cincinnati Southern Railway, though the governor professed not to know how he had earned it. Foraker forged an alliance with black editor Harry Clay Smith, who would be a supporter throughout his political career. On October 13, 1885, Foraker defeated Hoadly by 17,451 votes. Although he won much of the state, he did not carry Hamilton County due to election fraud.

== Governor of Ohio (1886–1890) ==
=== Policies as governor ===
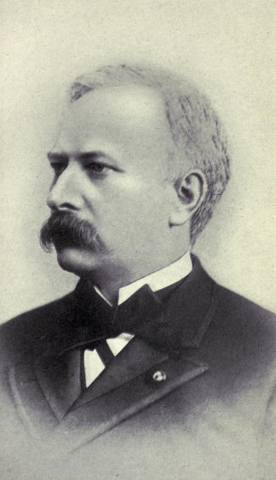
Foraker as governor of Ohio (c. 1886–1890)

Joseph Foraker was sworn in as governor on January 12, 1886, during an intense blizzard that prevented many of the political marching clubs hoping to honor him from reaching Columbus. In his inaugural address, he urged election reform, creation of a liquor licensing bureau, the abolition of laws that discriminated against blacks, and the establishment of a state board of health. With a Republican majority in both houses, the legislature enacted many of his proposals, including the Poorman Law, requiring voter registration in Cleveland and Cincinnati (and later in all large cities), as well as the Pugsley Law, which established nonpartisan boards to appoint election officials. The Ohio State Journal commented, "Not all that is needed in the way of amendments to the election laws of Ohio, but it will do for a starter." The Dow Law imposed an annual tax on businesses in the alcohol trade; most of the proceeds would go for poor relief and to the police fund. With Foraker's support, the remaining laws that allowed racial discrimination in Ohio were repealed.

Foraker became popular during his governorship for "waving the bloody shirt", that is, castigating the South for the Civil War. President Cleveland in 1887 requested northern governors to return captured Confederate battle flags. When Foraker was asked by a supporter if he would allow the banners to go South, he responded by telegraph, "No rebel flags will be returned while I am governor." Cleveland backed down, and Foraker was hailed as a hero by many, receiving thousands of congratulatory messages. Foraker criticized the President for vetoing a bill increasing war pensions and for going fishing on Decoration Day. When the governor visited Philadelphia later that year for the centennial of the Constitution, he rode at the head of a regiment of Ohio militia past the reviewing stand on which Cleveland stood. When Foraker saluted, Cleveland removed his hat, but did not bow slightly as he had for other state governors. Later that day, Foraker led a troop of Grand Army of the Republic veterans past Cleveland's reviewing stand in another parade, bearing an array of captured battle flags.

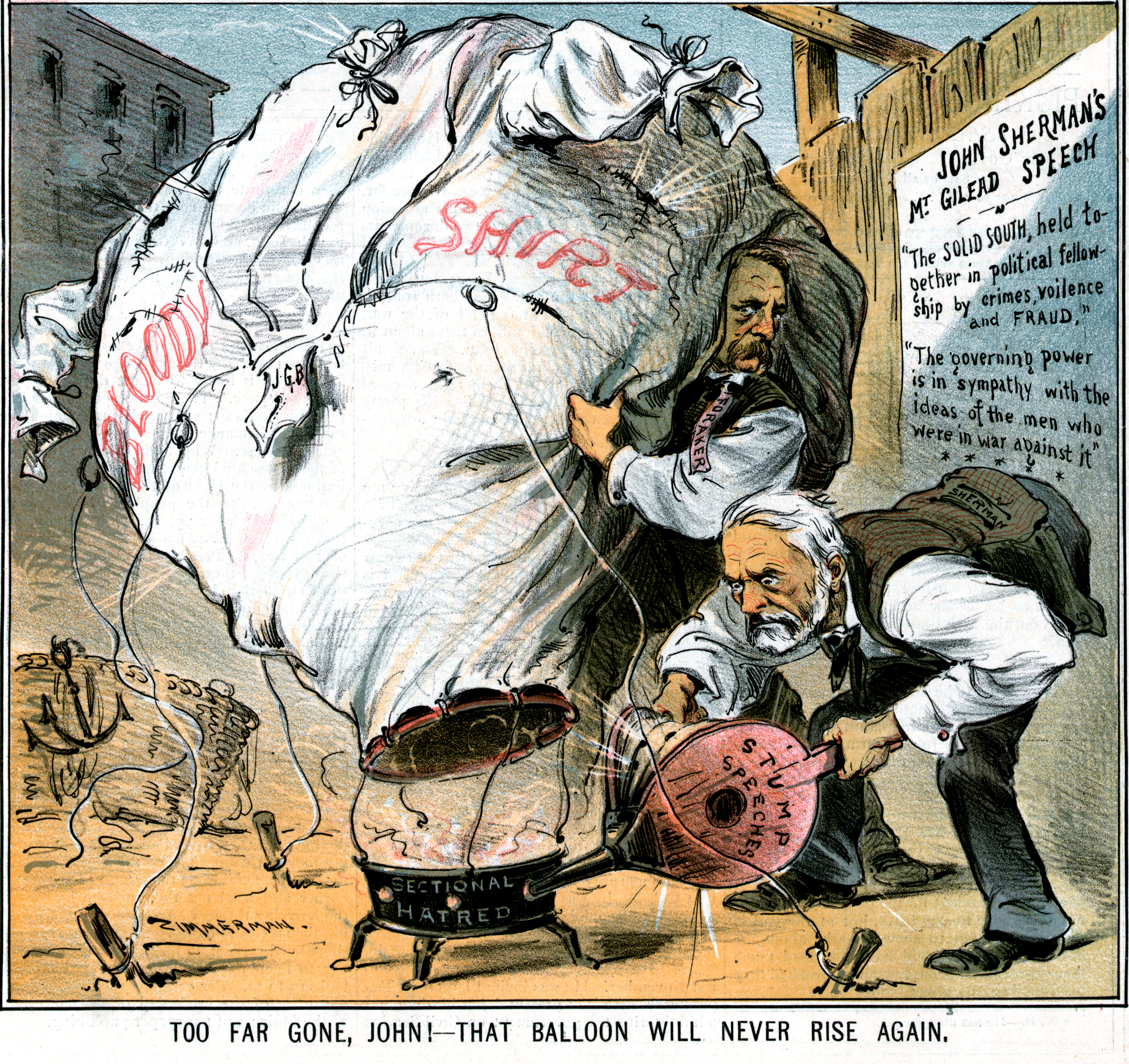
An 1885 political cartoon accuses U.S. senator John Sherman (right) and Foraker of "waving the bloody shirt" of the Civil War for political gain

Until mid-1888, Foraker had the enthusiastic support of Hanna, who, while still boosting John Sherman for president, was a generous contributor to the governor's 1885 and 1887 campaigns. Hanna hoped to be able to dispense patronage in northern Ohio. According to Hanna biographer William T. Horner, however, "unfortunately for Hanna, Foraker largely refused to grant Hanna the authority that by tradition he probably had earned." One example, later cited by Foraker as a reason his close relationship with Hanna ended, was the question of the position of state oil inspector, whose substantial fees were paid, not by the taxpayer, but by the oil companies, and who was permitted to appoint large numbers of deputies. In 1885, soon after Foraker's inauguration, Hanna advocated the appointment of William M. Bayne, while Congressman McKinley pressed the name of Edwin Hartshorn. Hanna agreed to withdraw Bayne, not to accommodate McKinley, but to save Foraker from a difficulty. Hanna wrote to Foraker, "I had a call from Major (Note: In the post-Civil War era, men who had served in the war as officers were often referred to by their onetime rank. Thus Major McKinley, Captain Foraker, General Benjamin Harrison, etc.) McKinley and his oil inspector candidate. ... I tell him he 'wants the earth' ..." However, Foraker instead reappointed the incumbent, Louis Smithnight. One of the men appointed deputy oil inspector was Harry Smith, the black editor who had supported Foraker in the 1885 election. McKinley again approached Foraker after his re-election in 1887 seeking Hartshorn's appointment; however, Foraker appointed George B. Cox, Republican boss of Cincinnati, as chief though Smithnight was retained as a deputy. In later years, Foraker suggested the dispute over the oil inspectorship was a reason for Hanna breaking from him and allying with McKinley, stating after Hanna's death in 1904, "I have often thought since that my appointment of Cox made McKinley president."

=== 1888 convention; defeat for third term ===
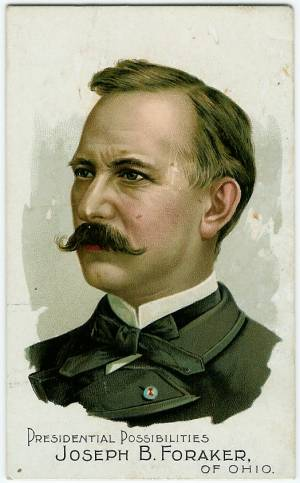
Foraker's card in the Duke Tobacco Company's 1888 "Presidential Possibilities" series

Walters traces fissures between Foraker's supporters and those of Sherman from as early as 1887. Foraker's meteoric rise in Ohio politics was a threat to Sherman, especially as Foraker was likely to seek another office after completing his time as governor. In 1887, McKinley, Hanna, Sherman, and others met at the congressman's home in Canton and decided to push for Sherman's endorsement for president by the 1887 Republican state convention in Toledo, and to threaten Foraker should he refuse to get in line. Despite some anti-Sherman feeling in Ohio, the resolution to endorse Sherman was adopted unanimously by the same convention that renominated Foraker, and later that year, the governor was re-elected.

Sherman was a leading candidate for the 1888 Republican presidential nomination, commanding the support of Ohio, much of Pennsylvania, and the South. Uncertainty over whether Blaine would be a candidate hung over the 1888 Republican National Convention in June in Chicago. Although Blaine had stated he was not running, his devotees hoped he might change his mind. Sherman did not fully trust Foraker, and gave over the management of his campaign to Hanna; the presidential candidate also declined to have Foraker place his name in nomination in favor of Daniel H. Hastings of Pennsylvania. At the convention, Foraker seconded Hastings' nomination of Sherman, but the senator, on the first ballot, received few votes outside the states known to back him. Sherman's southern support was discounted, as those states would not vote for the Republican nominee, and Sherman had paid the travel expenses of those delegates, who were for the most part black.

By the fourth ballot, on Saturday, June 23, Sherman had about the same number of votes he had started with, but faced a surge from former Indiana senator Benjamin Harrison. The convention adjourned until Monday, June 25. With almost two days for intrigue, rumors swept through the convention that Blaine would be a candidate after all. Late on Saturday night, Foraker released a statement that he would support Blaine. Walters proffered several reasons for the switch: Foraker felt Sherman had no chance, resented not being thanked by Sherman for the seconding speech, and was annoyed at the trickle of votes McKinley had received, feeling that the congressman was being prepared as a backup candidate for the Sherman forces. There was also talk that Foraker might gain a place on the ticket, either for president or vice president, though he stated he would not accept a nomination without Sherman's consent. The switch wounded Sherman's candidacy by showing that his own state's governor did not support him, and even though Foraker switched back to Sherman when Blaine wired reiterating that he was not a candidate, the damage was done; Harrison gained the nomination on the eighth ballot.

According to Horner, Foraker's temporary abandonment of Sherman was "the move that seems to have shattered his relationship with Hanna permanently". However, Foraker gave other reasons for the break, stating after Hanna's death that one reason for it was that Hanna bought up the extra tickets of black Southern convention delegates, a practice that the governor considered corrupt. J.B. Morrow, the newspaper publisher who took Foraker's statement as source material for Herbert Croly's 1912 biography of Hanna, disagreed: "it was understood at the time that his [Foraker's] heart was not in Sherman's candidacy ... his outraged feelings over Hanna's bargaining with Southern delegates can't be believed by me." According to Horner, "the split between Foraker and Hanna had a profound impact on the subsequent behavior of both men, their careers in politics, and the Republican Party in Ohio, which was fractured by the dispute."

Harrison was elected in November 1888 over President Cleveland. By 1889, Foraker was openly opposed by a faction of Ohio Republicans, led by Hanna, Sherman and McKinley. Foraker felt relieved at the break, writing to a friend, "From Toledo to Chicago, my neck was under a yoke, but now I am free." Despite the factional opposition, he sought a third term in 1889, hoping that if Republicans kept their majority in the legislature, he could be elected to the Senate as Sherman's junior colleague in the legislative election to be held in January 1890. (Note: Until 1913, US senators were elected by state legislatures, not the people. See Bybee, pp. 538–540) He was renominated at the 1889 state convention in Columbus on the second ballot, as the opposition to him was divided.

A law for the Sunday closing of saloons had been passed under Foraker; when Cincinnati mayor John B. Mosby proposed to enforce the law against local opposition, Foraker wired to Mosby the support of the state government. This stance alienated many anti-Prohibition Republicans. Another damaging incident was Foraker's claim, based on documents he procured that turned out to be forged, that Democratic gubernatorial candidate James E. Campbell had supported the adoption of a ballot box made by a company in which Campbell supposedly had a financial interest. The documents also bore the signatures of Sherman, McKinley, and other Foraker enemies; they were later shown to have been taken from franked mail. Campbell was not in fact involved with the company, and the affair cost Foraker votes. A congressional committee conducted an investigation in 1891 and cleared all of those whose signatures had been reproduced. However, it blamed Foraker for using the documents without verifying their authenticity. By then, Foraker was no longer governor, having been defeated by Campbell by 10,873 votes out of some 750,000 cast. McKinley biographer H. Wayne Morgan noted, "Clearly Foraker acted hastily and unwisely because of his desperate fight against Campbell and his bitterness towards the Shermanites." According to another of McKinley's biographers, Kevin Phillips: "when Foraker lost his bid for a third statehouse term, McKinley became Ohio's next-in-line presidential favorite son".

== Wilderness years (1890–1896) ==
=== Return to the law; first run for senator ===
Foraker returned to Cincinnati and the practice of law. Although initially he rejoined his old law partnership, he established his own offices in 1893, the year his son Joseph Jr. became an assistant in his office on graduating from Cornell. Joseph Benson Foraker Jr. was the first child of a Cornell alumnus to graduate from the university. The senior Foraker, though he accepted a broad array of cases, was a "political lawyer", lobbying the legislature to grant franchises to his clients, and arranging for bills unfavorable to his clients (who included the Edison Electric Company, Cincinnati Bell Telephone Company, and the Cincinnati Street Railway Company) to be quashed.

The former governor was enraged when in March 1890, Hanna gave a speech in New York stating, "Foraker is dead as a factor in our politics and Ohio is again as reliable a Republican state as it ever was." Foraker determined to secure election to the Senate; although the Democratic-controlled legislature had elected Calvin S. Brice to the Senate in 1890, Sherman's seat would be up for election in January 1892. McKinley was defeated for re-election to Congress in November 1890; his stature in Ohio politics was not diminished by the loss, as he was seen as a victim of gerrymandering. When the former congressman ran for governor the following year, he asked Foraker to place his name in nomination, which he did. Although some saw this as a rapprochement between the Sherman and Foraker factions, the former governor's supporters, such as Kurtz and millionaire Springfield manufacturer Asa Bushnell, were already campaigning for Foraker for Senate.

McKinley was elected governor in November 1891, and the Republicans took a two-thirds majority in the legislature. During the campaign, supporters of both Foraker and Sherman had sought pledges from candidates, and in the aftermath of the legislative elections, both men expressed confidence. Sherman was handicapped by his age (68), unpopularity, and a cold personality; according to Horner, "Foraker was simply more of a man of the people than Sherman could ever hope to be." Sherman's aide, Jacob C. Donaldson, later wrote, "the situation was bad, almost desperate". Hanna had made significant campaign contributions to legislative candidates, and was outraged when legislators believed to favor Sherman instead announced that they would vote for Foraker; according to his biographer, Herbert Croly, "The situation looked desperate; but it was saved, so Mr. Sherman himself stated to his friends, by Mr. Hanna's energy, enthusiasm and ability to bend other men to his will. Three of the Cleveland representatives, who had gone into hiding, were unearthed and forced into line." Foraker was defeated narrowly in the Republican caucus, first on a vote to hold a secret ballot (which would have benefited him), and then on the endorsement vote, which supported Sherman, who was subsequently elected by the legislature. According to Horner, "It is difficult to know which mattered more to Hanna—making sure his old friend Sherman kept his job or making sure that Foraker did not get it."

Sherman was not magnanimous in victory, telling friends that he would not rest until he "tomahawked the last of Foraker's crowd". Nevertheless, at the Republican state convention, Foraker and his supporters were able to gain their goal of half the delegates-at-large to the 1892 Republican National Convention in Minneapolis, free to vote as they pleased. President Harrison was seeking renomination; other men spoken of as possible candidates were Blaine (who had again disclaimed any interest in running) and McKinley. Prior to the Minneapolis convention, Hanna wrote to Foraker for the first time in four years, seeking to put aside differences in support of McKinley. Foraker agreed; he disliked Harrison and did not feel he could be re-elected. McKinley finished third for the nomination, a fraction of a vote behind Blaine. Harrison was defeated by Cleveland in the November election, and McKinley was spoken of as the most likely Republican presidential contender for 1896.

=== Election to the Senate; involvement in presidential race ===
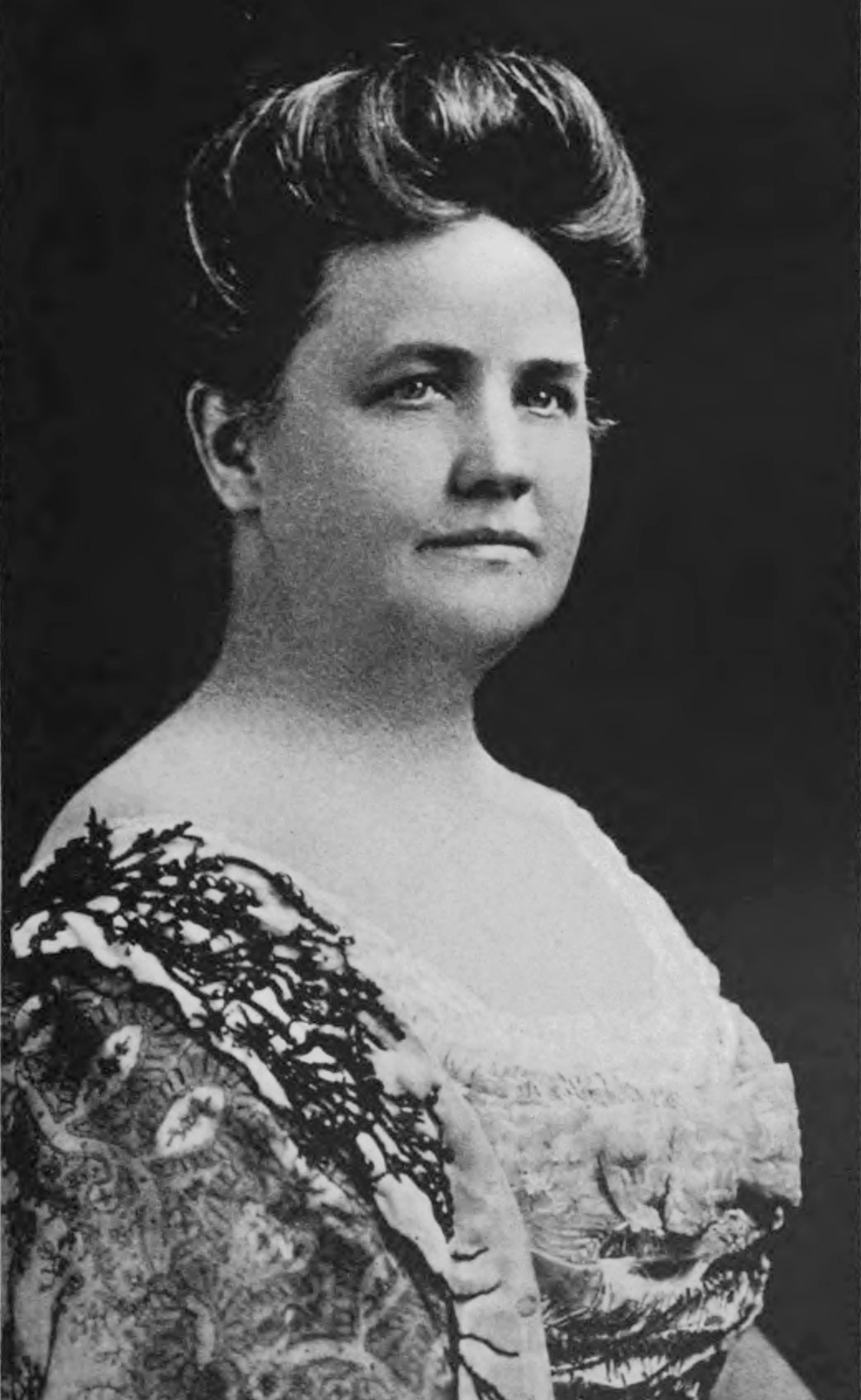
Foraker married Julia Ann Paine Bundy in 1870

Foraker had little involvement in politics in 1893 and 1894, concentrating on the law. He still sought a Senate seat, however, and carefully planned his strategy for the 1895 state convention in Zanesville. Foraker forces gained full control, nominating Bushnell for governor to succeed McKinley, and Foraker allies for other state offices. The convention also endorsed Foraker for Senate, the first time a specific individual had been backed for Senate by an Ohio Republican convention. According to Walters, "The Zanesville convention represented the highest pinnicle of Foraker's power in Ohio politics. He had selected the platform, chosen the next governor and the complete ticket, and had secured for himself virtual election to the United States Senate." Foraker took a leading role as a speaker in the campaign, and the November election resulted in victory for Bushnell and a Republican majority in the legislature. That majority, on January 15, 1896, elected Joseph Foraker to the Senate.

Even before the senatorial election, the rival factions in the Ohio Republican Party were battling less than usual, but it was not until the day of the senatorial election that McKinley and Foraker reached a definite understanding for peace during the 1896 campaign. Foraker agreed to support McKinley's presidential bid, and to travel to New York to approach that state's Republican political boss, Senator Thomas C. Platt, hoping to gain Platt's support for McKinley. In March, Foraker addressed the state convention in support of McKinley in a widely publicized speech. However, he was reluctant to be a delegate to the national convention, fearing that he would be blamed if anything went wrong with McKinley's candidacy. It was only after considerable prodding from the presidential candidate that Foraker agreed to be a delegate, and to place McKinley's name in nomination. McKinley desired that Foraker nominate him to show that he had the united support of the state Republican Party. (Note: Foraker and other McKinley agents were unsuccessful; Platt battled McKinley until the convention. See Stanley Jones, p. 149) Senator-elect Foraker eventually agreed, and gave the nominating speech, part of which was heard by McKinley via telephone line to Canton.

The Democrats nominated former Nebraska congressman William Jennings Bryan, who had electrified the Democratic National Convention with his Cross of Gold speech. When Bryan accepted his nomination with a lengthy address in New York, the senator-elect commented, "Mr. Bryan made himself by one speech, and now he has unmade himself by one speech". Although Foraker went to Europe for four weeks (his sole trip abroad), he gave almost 200 speeches for the Republicans once he returned. McKinley was elected president with a comfortable majority in the Electoral College.

== Senator (1897–1909) ==
On March 4, 1897, the same day William McKinley became president, Joseph Foraker was sworn in as senator from Ohio. The new legislator was escorted to the bar of the Senate by Sherman; his swearing-in helped cement a modest Republican majority. Foraker continued his private legal work, which was not unusual at the time as many senators maintained business interests. Wealthy through his law practice, Foraker did not stand out in that regard either, as the "rich man's club" of the Senate of that era contained about 25 millionaires.

=== Rivalry with Hanna ===
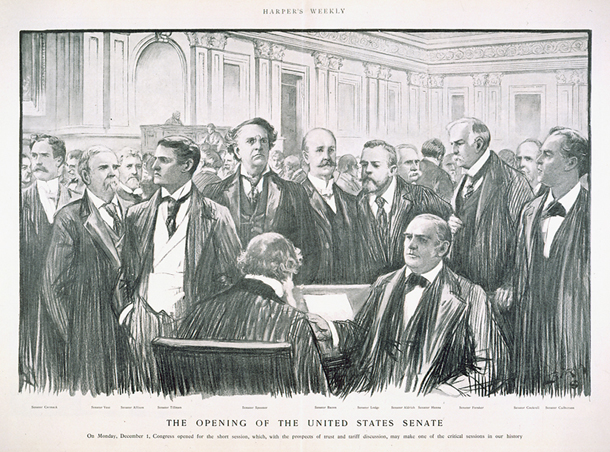
Drawing of the opening of the Senate session in December 1902. Foraker's rival Mark Hanna is the shorter man to the right of the clerk; Foraker stands behind Hanna and slightly to his right.

During the 1896 campaign, Hanna served as chairman of the Republican National Committee, in charge of McKinley's campaign, and obtained millions for his presidential candidate by soliciting donations from wealthy businessmen. After the November election, Foraker met with Hanna and was surprised to learn that President-elect McKinley and Hanna planned that Sherman would be appointed Secretary of State and that the industrialist would take Sherman's place in the Senate. Foraker objected to both components of this plan, feeling that Hanna was not qualified as a legislator, and that Sherman, whose faculties were starting to fail, should not become Secretary of State. Foraker met with McKinley, but failed to convince him.

Bushnell (who would get to appoint a temporary replacement) and Foraker (a close political ally of the governor) did not want to appoint Hanna; their faction had several candidates, including Bushnell himself, for the next election for Sherman's seat in 1898. Bushnell and Foraker resisted for a month once the pending appointment of Sherman became known in January 1897, during which time the governor offered the seat to Congressman Theodore E. Burton, who declined. It was not until February 21 that Bushnell finally announced Hanna's appointment, effective upon Sherman's resignation. This controversy to some extent overshadowed Foraker's swearing-in as senator on March 4—Hanna adherents claimed that Bushnell had delayed the effective date of the industrialist's appointment until Foraker took his seat so that Hanna would be the junior senator. In his memoirs, Foraker denied this, noting that Sherman was unwilling to resign until the afternoon of March 4, after the new president and Congress were sworn in and the new Cabinet, including Sherman, was confirmed by the Senate. Hanna was given his commission as senator by Bushnell on the morning of March 5.

Foraker had known that with McKinley in the Executive Mansion (as the White House was still formally known) and Sherman expected to be senior senator, he could expect only limited patronage appointments for his supporters. With McKinley's close friend Hanna instead in the Senate, Foraker was allowed to recommend appointees to the President, but McKinley allowed Hanna to exercise a veto over Foraker's candidates.

Foraker was not visibly involved in the unsuccessful efforts to deny Hanna re-election in 1898, but several of his allies, including Bushnell and Kurtz, were part of the opposition. Foraker nominated McKinley again at the 1900 convention; his florid praise of the president pleased the delegates. As McKinley's original vice president, Garret Hobart, had died in 1899, he required a new running mate for the 1900 campaign, and the convention chose the popular Spanish–American War hero, New York governor Theodore Roosevelt. Foraker had maintained friendly relations with Roosevelt since the two men met at the 1884 convention, but Hanna bitterly opposed the choice. Foraker spoke widely during McKinley's successful re-election campaign.

After President McKinley was assassinated in September 1901, Foraker attended the funeral services and addressed a large memorial meeting at the Cincinnati Music Hall. When politics resumed after the mourning, Foraker spoke in defense of President Roosevelt's inviting Booker T. Washington, a black man, to the White House. This helped ensure support from the black community in Foraker's successful re-election bid in January 1902, which was not opposed by the Hanna faction.

Both Hanna and Foraker had been spoken of as possible Republican presidential candidates in 1904; with President Roosevelt now likely to be the nominee, both men's presidential ambitions were pushed back four years. Hanna in particular was reluctant to publicly put aside his presidential candidacy, believing that keeping it alive would help assure his re-election by the legislature in 1904. In 1903, Foraker saw an opportunity to embarrass Hanna and boost his own chances for 1908 by getting the Republican state convention to pass a resolution endorsing Roosevelt for re-election. If Hanna supported the resolution, he made it clear he would not be a candidate; if he opposed it, he risked Roosevelt's wrath. Hanna sent Roosevelt a telegram that he would oppose the resolution; Roosevelt replied that he expected his administration's supporters to vote for such a resolution, and Hanna gave in.

In February 1904, Hanna died of typhoid fever, and his Senate seat and factional leadership were won by Charles Dick, a four-term congressman who had received favorable publicity due to his Spanish–American War service. Dick was able to work out an accommodation with Foraker's faction and was thereafter considered the leader of Ohio's Republican "stand-patters", who saw no immediate need for social change.

=== War and territorial gain ===
In the year between his swearing-in and the 1898 Spanish–American War, Foraker was an enthusiastic supporter of Cuban independence from Spain. A special session of Congress, called at the request of President McKinley, met beginning in March 1897 to consider new tariff legislation; hawkish senators, including Foraker (who was made a member of the Senate Foreign Relations Committee), took the opportunity to press resolutions in support of the Cuban insurgents. Foraker was impatient with McKinley's policy towards Spain, decrying the President's State of the Union communication to Congress in December 1897 and his so-called "war message", which some deemed insufficiently bellicose, in April 1898. The senator stated to a reporter of the latter, "I have no patience with the message and you may say so. I have heard nothing but condemnation of the message on all hands."

Foraker had introduced a resolution calling for Spain to withdraw from Cuba, and for the recognition of the rebels as the legitimate government of an independent Cuba. The resolution that passed Congress in April called for all those things except recognition (deleted at the request of the administration) and authorized the President to use force to achieve those aims. McKinley's signature on the joint resolution caused Spain to break off diplomatic relations and war was quickly declared. Foraker followed the war closely—his elder son was fighting in it—and was an early proponent of the US keeping Spanish colonies it had captured, such as the Philippines and Puerto Rico.

McKinley had attempted to annex Hawaii, but the annexation treaty failed to be ratified by the Senate. Congressional leaders decided to try again, this time using a joint resolution that would bypass the need for a two-thirds vote in the Senate. The American victory at the Battle of Manila Bay in early May revived interest in the Hawaiian matter. Foraker was a major proponent of the resolution in the Foreign Relations Committee and was the only committee member to speak in the debate. Opposition was mostly from Democrats, who objected to the revolution by which American interests had taken control of the islands in 1893, a seizure defended by Foraker. In early July, proponents were able to get the resolution through both houses of Congress, and President McKinley signed it on July 8.

The new American possession of Puerto Rico found itself in financial woes soon after its acquisition—its principal export, coffee, was now barred by high tariffs from both Spanish and American markets. Foraker took the lead in drafting and pressing legislation establishing a civil government for the island. Although Foraker had proposed to eliminate tariffs on imports from Puerto Rico, to secure passage of the legislation he had to accept a rate of 15% for two years as the island developed a taxation system, after which there would be no tariff, and the money would be used to develop the island. The Foraker Act was signed by President McKinley on April 12, 1900. It required an American-appointed governor and a legislature in which a majority of the upper house would be American-appointed, and did not grant Puerto Ricans American citizenship. Foraker had wanted to give the islanders US citizenship, but neither the administration nor much of the Congress agreed with him. In 1901, the Foraker Act was upheld by the Supreme Court, which ruled in Downes v. Bidwell that the Constitution did not apply to Puerto Rico and that Congress could legislate for it (or, in the phrase then current, the Constitution did not follow the flag).

=== Opposition to Roosevelt ===
Foraker maintained generally friendly relations with Roosevelt in the president's first term: lacking an electoral mandate, Roosevelt had pledged after the assassination to carry out McKinley's policies. Elected in his own right in November 1904, President Roosevelt felt freer to support progressive policies. When Roosevelt told Foraker his plans after the election, Foraker initially took no alarm, but according to Walters, "the resulting antagonism led to the political elimination of Foraker in 1908."

Their relationship began to break down over the question of railroad regulation. The President in 1905 sought legislation to give the Interstate Commerce Commission (ICC) the power to set freight rates; Foraker considered the proposed law unconstitutional, and introduced a bill by which the railroad would set the rates, and if the ICC found they were excessive, it could ask the attorney general to bring suit. Foraker spoke repeatedly against the administration-favored bill as it moved through the Senate, and was one of only three senators (and the only Republican) to oppose the resulting Hepburn Act on final Senate passage. As the Ohio legislature had passed a resolution urging Foraker and Dick to vote for the bill, he faced anger at home; one newspaper wrote that Foraker had extinguished his chances of becoming president with his vote. The following year, Foraker also broke with the administration on the question of statehood for Arizona and New Mexico, feeling that the two territories should not be combined into one state unless a merger was approved in referendums. Foraker's position prevailed in Congress; despite his stance, Roosevelt signed the resulting bill. The two men also differed on issues of patronage, and on a series of treaties requiring Senate ratification that allowed for international agreements without the need for Senate approval. Roosevelt wrote to a friend that Foraker seemed determine to fight him on every point, good or bad.

==== Brownsville case ====
On the night of August 14, 1906, gunshots were heard in the border town of Brownsville, Texas; one resident was killed and a police officer wounded. Various military items, including discharged rifle shells, were presented by the local mayor as evidence that troops of the 25th Infantry Battalion, stationed outside of town and consisting of blacks, were responsible. When questioned, all denied involvement. Nevertheless, their white officers reported to the War Department that undetermined men belonging to the 25th Infantry were responsible, and that others of the battalion were aware of who had done it, but were remaining silent. Despite an almost total lack of evidence, on November 5, 1906 (just after the midterm congressional elections), Roosevelt ordered 167 soldiers dishonorably discharged and made ineligible for federal employment, including such decorated soldiers as First Sergeant Mingo Sanders, who had fought alongside Roosevelt in Cuba. The President adhered to his decision despite appeals from both whites and blacks.

Foraker was initially convinced of the guilt of the men, but reconsidered after evidence obtained in a private investigation by progressive organizations was presented to him (the black attorney presenting it was denied an audience with Roosevelt). According to Roosevelt biographer Edmund Morris, "Foraker had a passion for racial justice." Recalling Foraker's desire, as a soldier, to see slavery abolished and the black man given the same civil and political rights as the white man, Morris explains, "Senator Foraker merely felt the same about the Constitution in 1906 as Private Foraker had felt in 1862." In addition to his desire to see justice done, Foraker also saw political advantage in opposing Roosevelt over the Brownsville issue; he might boost his own presidential ambitions for 1908 by making both Roosevelt and his designated heir apparent, Secretary of War William Howard Taft, look bad.

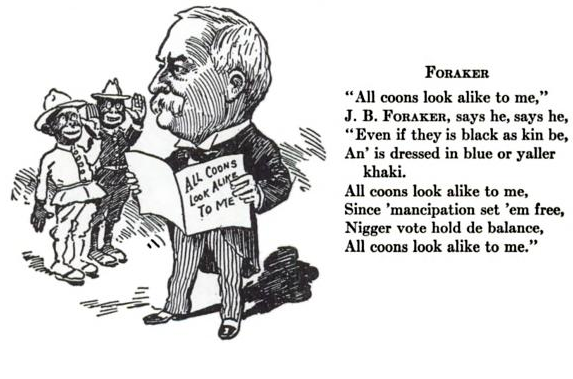
Cartoon and verse satirizing Foraker from the 1907 Gridiron Dinner

Foraker battled to have the Senate investigate the Brownsville case, and got the body to pass a resolution requiring Taft to turn over information. By late January 1907, after further investigation, Roosevelt had rescinded the part of the order barring the soldiers from federal employment, and had stated that he would reconsider the case of anyone who could present proof of his innocence. Foraker had claimed that the president lacked the authority to discharge the men; to get a resolution passed for an investigatory committee, he had to withdraw that assertion.

Matters came to a head at the Gridiron Dinner (Note: A dinner with entertainment and speeches sponsored by a media organization for press and politicians; normally the speeches are not to be reported. The Foraker-Roosevelt confrontation was too juicy not to print, however. See Walters, p. 140) on January 27; the program showed cartoons of the leading attendees and accompanying verses. Foraker's read "All coons look alike to me", suggesting his Brownsville stance was to attract the black vote. According to Walters, "the jests had been pointed and the cartoons biting"; Roosevelt was seen to be angry. Nevertheless, when the President rose to speak, all that was expected was a few minutes of humorous comments. Instead, in his speech, Roosevelt attacked Foraker and defended his own conduct in the Brownsville case. Although it was not customary to permit anyone to follow a president's speech, Foraker was allowed to reply. The Washington Post reported that Foraker "gave the President the plainest talk he has probably ever listened to." Foraker stated that Sergeant Sanders had been dishonorably discharged even though "he was as innocent of any offense against the law of any kind whatever as the President himself"—and, he charged, Roosevelt was fully aware the soldiers had been wronged. He denied that he was after votes with his position, "I was seeking to provide for those men an opportunity to be heard in their own defense, to give them a chance to confront their accusers and cross-examine their witnesses, and establish the real facts in the case." Roosevelt spoke in angry rebuttal, but according to his biographer Morris, "Never before, at the Gridiron or anywhere else, had a President been challenged before an audience."

=== Defeat for re-election ===
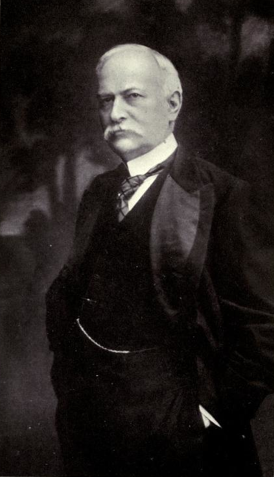
Foraker in 1908

In the aftermath of the Gridiron Dinner, Foraker was increasingly ostracized, both politically and socially. Unwelcome at the White House, he was excluded from patronage. Nevertheless, the Committee on Military Affairs, on which Foraker sat, went ahead and held hearings into the Brownsville matter between February and June 1907. Author John Weaver, in his 1997 book on the Brownsville case, takes note of "Foraker's masterful presentation of fact and law", including his cross-examination of witnesses who sought to convince the committee of the soldiers' guilt. In March 1908, the committee issued its report, by a vote of 9–4 endorsing the President's action. While the official minority report found the evidence inconclusive, Foraker and Connecticut senator Morgan Bulkeley signed a separate report stating that "the weight of the testimony shows that none of the soldiers of the Twenty-fifth U.S. Infantry participated in the shooting affray".

Although he knew he had little chance of winning, Foraker challenged Taft for the Republican nomination for president. He hoped to secure a deal whereby he would endorse Taft in exchange for support in the senatorial election to be held in January 1909. (Note: Ohio had moved legislative elections from odd-numbered to even-numbered years in 1905, meaning that Foraker's re-election would be determined by legislators elected in November 1908, at the legislative session in January 1909, two months before the end of his term. See Ohio Amendments) Roosevelt was determined to drive Foraker from politics, and Taft refused to deal. Taft won at each stage of the delegate-selection process, gaining all but two delegates from Ohio. At the 1908 Republican National Convention, Taft received 702 votes and was nominated; Foraker received 16, of which 11 came from blacks.

After failing to capture the Republican presidential nomination, Foraker concentrated on campaigning for re-election to the Senate. His vote on the Hepburn Act and his opposition to Roosevelt had provoked opposition to him within the Ohio Republican Party; in addition, both he and Dick were seen by some as the face of the old guard of the party, out of place in the Progressive Era. Many of those who opposed him proposed Congressman Theodore E. Burton for the Senate seat; Foraker stated that the first thing to do was secure a Republican legislature, with the question of who should be senator left until victory was obtained.

Amid speculation as to Taft's position on Foraker, the two men met, to all appearances cordially, on September 2 at the Grand Army of the Republic encampment at Toledo, and later that day, the two men appeared on the same platform. Taft spoke in appreciation of Foraker, who, as governor, had appointed him as a judge, giving him his start in public life. Foraker, for his part, stated that Taft would be his party leader during the campaign, and called on the presidential candidate at his headquarters in Cincinnati a week later. The Taft campaign asked Foraker to preside, and to introduce Taft, at a rally to be held at the Cincinnati Music Hall on September 22. In a letter to a newspaper publisher, Taft pointed out that Foraker "can be useful with the colored vote and the Grand Army vote".

The seeming rapprochement was shattered when publisher William Randolph Hearst, giving a speech in Columbus, read from letters to Foraker by Standard Oil Company vice president John D. Archbold. During Foraker's first term in the Senate, he had done legal work for Standard Oil. In the letters, Archbold referred to legislation he considered objectionable, and also mentioned the substantial fees to Foraker; according to historian Matthew Josephson, Foraker, "while occupying strategic positions in Senate committees received considerations from the Standard Oil Company running as high as $44,000 in a single period of six months - this coming at the very time when he was busily engaged in preparing the anti-Trust planks of the Republican platform." Hearst suggested the fees were a bribe for the killing of the legislation. Foraker quickly denied any impropriety, stating that the relationship was not secret and the excerpts had been read out of context. Foraker noted that when he was retained by the corporation in December 1898, it had not yet come under federal scrutiny, and when Archbold had sought to retain him in 1906, he had declined. Standard Oil was wildly unpopular, and the controversy put Taft in a difficult position. Foraker sent a letter to Taft, hand-delivered by Senator Dick, expressing his willingness to avoid the Music Hall meeting. Taft said only that he hoped Foraker would meet with the organizers of the event and follow their recommendation, which Foraker took to mean that Taft was giving credence to Hearst's charges and did not want him there. Foraker cancelled all remaining campaign speeches. Ohio helped elect Taft and elected a Democratic governor, but returned a Republican legislature, which would elect a senator in January 1909.

Through December, Foraker worked to try to retain his Senate seat, which required action by the Ohio legislature in the era before direct election of senators. His rivals were Burton and the President-elect's brother, former congressman Charles Phelps Taft, though near the end of the contest, former lieutenant governor Warren G. Harding asked for his name to be considered. Both Foraker and Burton opposed Charles Taft's call for a caucus of the Republican legislators to determine the party's candidate. On December 29, President Roosevelt weighed in on the question. Roosevelt "lost no time in putting the Republican members of the Ohio legislature on notice that to re-elect Mr. Foraker to the Senate would be regarded as nothing less than treason to the party". Roosevelt accused Foraker of seeking to make a bargain with the Democrats to secure his re-election in exchange for a Democratic replacement for Dick in 1911. Faced with this presidential intervention and Charles Taft's withdrawal from the race, Foraker conceded on December 31. The Republican caucus two days later selected Burton, whom the legislators duly selected on January 12.

Foraker continued to work on Brownsville in his remaining time in office, guiding a resolution through Congress to establish a board of inquiry with the power to reinstate the soldiers. The bill, which the administration did not oppose, was less than Foraker wanted. He had hoped for a requirement that unless specific evidence was shown against a man, he would be allowed to re-enlist. The legislation passed both houses and was signed by Roosevelt on March 2, 1909. (Note: Of the 167 soldiers dismissed by Roosevelt, 14 were made eligible for reinstatement in 1910 by the board. In 1972, Secretary of the Army Robert Frederick Froehlke ordered all 167 cleared. At the time, two of the 167 were still alive, of whom one had been reinstated in 1910. Legislation to compensate the one who had not been reinstated, Dorsie Willis, passed Congress and was signed by President Richard Nixon in December 1973. See Weaver, pp. xvi–xviii, 209–210) On March 6, 1909, shortly after he left the Senate, Foraker was the guest of honor at a mass meeting at Washington's Metropolitan African Methodist Episcopal Church. Though both whites and blacks assembled to recognize the former senator, all the speakers were blacks, save Foraker. Presented with a silver loving cup, he addressed the crowd,

I have said that I do not believe that a man in that battalion had anything to do with the shooting up of "Brownsville", but whether any one of them had, it was our duty to ourselves as a great, strong, and powerful nation to give every man a hearing, to deal fairly and squarely with every man; to see to it that justice was done to him; that he should be heard.

== Final years ==
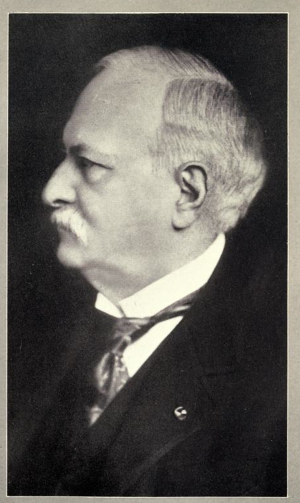
Foraker in his final years (c. 1909–1916)

As with his defeat for governor twenty years earlier, Foraker returned after losing re-election to Cincinnati and the full-time practice of law. He found a number of well-paying corporations willing to retain him as counsel. Foraker represented the American Multigraph Company before the Supreme Court, seeking to overturn a Taft-backed law imposing an excise tax on corporations. Several cases were consolidated into Flint v. Stone Tracy Company (1911), in which the Supreme Court upheld the law.

Although he expressed bitterness upon leaving office, wishing he had never left the farm in Highland County, he soon resumed his involvement in politics, speaking for the unsuccessful Republican candidate for governor, Harding, in 1910. The gubernatorial candidate had previously supported Foraker, though he had backed Taft in 1908. In 1912, Foraker made speeches in support of Taft's re-election bid, although he felt he had been badly treated by Taft in 1908. Foraker refused, however, to attack the third-party candidate, former president Roosevelt, whose candidacy split the party and led to the election of Democrat Woodrow Wilson.

In 1913, ratification of the Seventeenth Amendment to the United States Constitution changed the method of choosing senators from legislative vote to election by the people. Buoyed by positive reviews of his participation in the 1912 campaign, and wishing to avenge his defeat for re-election, Foraker entered the 1914 Republican primary against Senator Burton and former congressman Ralph D. Cole. When Burton withdrew, Foraker became the favorite. However, Foraker had made enemies, and others believed that his "old guard" Republicanism was out of date, Harding was reluctant, but was eventually persuaded to enter the primary. Although Harding did not attack Foraker, his supporters, including Cleveland publisher Dan R. Hanna (son of the late senator), had no such scruples. Harding won the primary with 88,540 votes to 76,817 for Foraker and 52,237 for Cole, and subsequently won the general election. Harding sent Foraker a letter regretting the primary result, but Foraker was more bitter towards the electorate, feeling they returned ingratitude for his previous public service.

With his political career at an end, Foraker began work on his memoirs, Notes of a Busy Life, published in 1916. Roosevelt, after reading Foraker's autobiography, wrote that he regretted his attacks. Roosevelt concluded his letter with an invitation to visit him at his home in New York. Foraker treasured this letter, which he felt re-established his friendship with Roosevelt, although the two men did not meet in the short time remaining to Foraker.

Foraker supported President Wilson as he moved the nation closer to intervention in World War I. In April 1917, Foraker was one of a group of Cincinnatians who organized to support Wilson when the President asked Congress to declare war on Germany. Foraker's ill-health (he had suffered several heart attacks during the preceding winter) limited his participation. On May 7, he experienced another heart attack in downtown Cincinnati. Taken home, he lapsed in and out of consciousness for three days before dying on May 10, 1917. Hundreds of prominent Cincinnatians attended his interment at Spring Grove Cemetery on May 13.

== Namesakes ==
Mount Foraker, a 17,400-foot (5,304 m) mountain in Denali National Park 15 mi (24 km) southwest of Denali Pass, in the central Alaska Range, was named for Foraker, then a sitting U.S. senator, in 1899 by Lt. J. S. Herron. It is the second highest mountain in the Alaska Range, and the third highest in the United States.

== Assessment ==
Historian Allan Nevins, in his foreword to Walters' biography of Foraker, suggested that Foraker did not attain the presidency, as he had hoped, because of the ambitions of other Ohio politicians. While Foraker might have secured the nomination in 1888 as a compromise candidate, had not his pledges to Sherman prevented it, having

stood aside for an older man[,] year after year he was compelled to stand aside for younger leaders. First McKinley, with Hanna at his side, was given precedence; then Taft, whom Foraker had given a start in public life, scaled the peak. Foraker, for all his administrative capacity, his wide popular appeal, and his unflinching courage, had the tragic lot of seeing a succession of associates go above him.

Even Foraker's final defeat, in 1914, proved to be part of the political rise of another president from Ohio, Harding. Nevins noted the aggressive nature of Foraker's political style, and commented, "How much of his failure to reach high office was attributable to ill fortune and how much to some of his traits, readers ... may judge for themselves."

According to Nevins, "in the era which began after McKinley's assassination he did not show the progressive qualities which the electorate increasingly demanded; indeed, he seemed positively reactionary." Walters agreed, noting that Foraker's 1914 defeat was caused in part by fears that his "uncompromising Republicanism of an earlier era would injure the party. The stirring principles of the New Freedom called for new leaders." Historian Benjamin Kendrick noted that "Mr. Foraker was among the first of prominent politicians to be retired because of their too close connection with 'Big Business'."

Historian Louis L. Gould, who wrote a study of the McKinley administration, stated that Foraker "may well have been too close to some large corporations, but he also retained some vestiges of the commitment of the Civil War generation in the North to the idea of human equality ... This prompted him to champion the cause of the Negro soldiers." According to historian Percy Murray:

[his] political career ended partially because of his support for and espousal of black rights ... Perhaps Smith best summed up his alliance with Foraker when he stated that it was time for Afro-Americans to ... show full support for Foraker and men like him who supported the efforts of Afro-Americans.

Walter Rucker and James Upton, in their Encyclopedia of American Race Riots, write:

Senator Foraker is acknowledged as the key person in Congress to keep the issue of the Brownsville soldiers alive. He made speeches about it and wrote about it. His statement in defense of the soldiers was summed up appropriately when he said that the soldiers "ask[ed] no favors because they are Negroes, but only justice because they are men".

== Bibliography ==
=== Books ===
- Croly, Herbert (1912). Marcus Alonzo Hanna: His Life and Work. New York: The Macmillan Company. OCLC 715683.
- Foraker, Joseph Benson (1917) [1916]. Notes of a Busy Life. Vol. 1 (3rd ed.). Cincinnati: Stewart & Kidd Company.
- Foraker, Joseph Benson (1916). Notes of a Busy Life. Vol. 2. Cincinnati: Stewart & Kidd Company.
- Gould, Lewis L. (1980). The Presidency of William McKinley. American Presidency. Lawrence, Kan.: University Press of Kansas. ISBN 978-0-7006-0206-3.
- Goss, Charles Frederic (1912). Cincinnati, the Queen City, 1788–1912. Vol. 2. Cincinnati: S J Clarke Publishing Company.
- Horner, William T. (2010). Ohio's Kingmaker: Mark Hanna, Man and Myth. Athens, Ohio: Ohio University Press. ISBN 978-0-8214-1894-9.
- Jones, Stanley L. (1964). The Presidential Election of 1896. Madison, Wis.: University of Wisconsin Press. OCLC 445683.
- Knepper, George W. (2003). Ohio and Its People. Kent, Ohio: Kent State University Press. ISBN 978-0-87338-791-0.
- Leech, Margaret (1959). In the Days of McKinley. New York: Harper and Brothers. OCLC 456809.
- Lembeck, Harry. Taking on Theodore Roosevelt: How One Senator Defied the President on Brownsville and Shook American Politics (Prometheus Books, 2015). 544pp. online review
- Morgan, H. Wayne (2003). William McKinley and His America (revised ed.). Kent, Ohio: The Kent State University Press. ISBN 978-0-87338-765-1.
- Morris, Edmund (2001). Theodore Rex. New York: Random House. ISBN 978-0-394-55509-6.
- Phillips, Kevin (2003). William McKinley. New York: Times Books. ISBN 978-0-8050-6953-2.
- Reed, George Irving; Randall, Emilius Oviatt; Greve, Charles Theodore, eds. (1897). Bench and Bar of Ohio: a Compendium of History and Biography. Vol. 1. Chicago: Century Publishing and Engraving Company. pp. 467–470.
- Rucker, Walter; Upton, James (2007). Encyclopedia of American Race Riots. Vol. 1. Westport, Conn.: Greenwood Press. ISBN 978-0-313-33301-9.
- Walters, Everett (1948). Joseph Benson Foraker: An Uncompromising Republican. Columbus, Ohio: The Ohio History Press.
- Weaver, John D. (1997). The Senator and the Sharecropper's Son: Exoneration of the Brownsville Soldiers. College Station, Tex.: Texas A&M University Press. ISBN 978-0-89096-748-5.
- Williams, R. Hal (2010). Realigning America: McKinley, Bryan and the Remarkable Election of 1896. Lawrence, Kan.: University Press of Kansas. ISBN 978-0-7006-1721-0.

=== Other sources ===
- Bybee, Jay S. (Winter 1997). "Ulysses at the Mast: Democracy, Federalism, and the Sirens' Song of the Seventeenth Amendment". Northwestern University Law Review. 91 (2). Evanston, Ill.: Northwestern University: 500–572.
- Kendrick, Benjamin B. (December 1916). "McKinley and Foraker". Political Science Quarterly. 31 (4). The Academy of Political Science: 590–604. doi:10.2307/2141630. JSTOR 2141630.
- Murray, Percy E. (Spring 1983). "Harry C. Smith–Joseph B. Foraker alliance: Coalition politics in Ohio". The Journal of Negro History. 68 (2). Association for the Study of African American Life and History, Inc.: 171–184. doi:10.2307/2717720. JSTOR 2717720. S2CID 150129863.
- "Table of proposed Ohio constitutional amendments and votes". Cleveland State University Cleveland–Marshall College of Law. Archived from the original on June 16, 2013.
- "Mr. Foraker thanks legislators". The New York Times. January 16, 1896.
- Flint v. Stone Tracy Co., 220 U.S. 107, 127 (Supreme Court of the United States March 13, 1911).
- "Warren G. Harding". The Presidents. The White House. Archived from the original on July 26, 2012.

Political offices
Preceded by George Hoadly	Governor of Ohio; 1886–1890	Succeeded by James E. Campbell
U.S. Senate
Preceded by Calvin S. Brice	U.S. senator (Class 3) from Ohio; 1897–1909; Served alongside: John Sherman, Marcus A. Hanna, Charles W. F. Dick	Succeeded by Theodore E. Burton
Party political offices
Preceded by Charles Foster	Republican Party nominee for Governor of Ohio; 1883, 1885, 1887, 1889	Succeeded by William McKinley
