= Altafiber =

American telecommunications company

Cincinnati Bell, Inc.

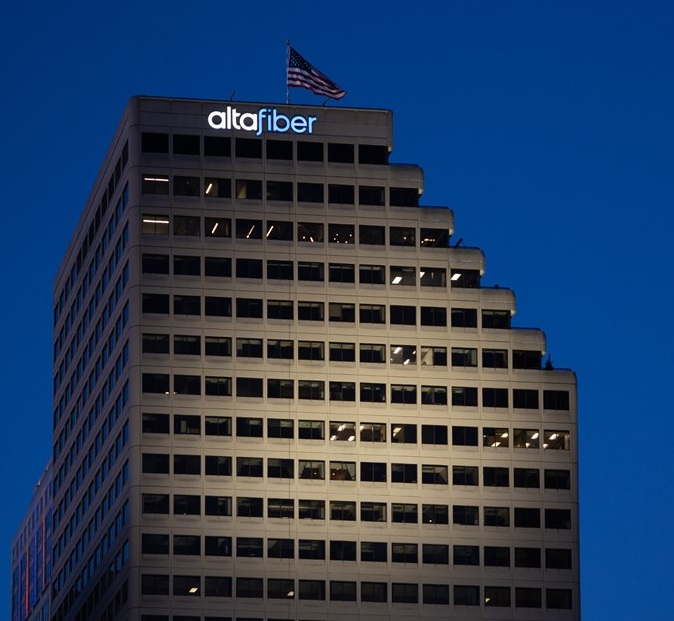
- Altafiber's headquarters
- Trade name: Altafiber
- Type: Subsidiary
- Traded as: (as Cincinnati Bell) NYSE: CBB
- Industry: Telecommunications
- Founded: 1873; 153 years ago
- Headquarters: Cincinnati, Ohio, United States
- Area served: Indiana, Kentucky, Ohio, Hawaii
- Key people: Leigh R. Fox (President & CEO); Greg Wheeler (COO); Joshua T. Duckworth (CFO); Ronald Beerman (CNO); Kevin Murray (CIO)
- Products: Local telephone service, IPTV internet
- Revenue: ▲US$1.599 billion (2020)
- Operating income: ▼US$66.0 million (2020)
- Net income: ▲ -US$55.6 million (2020)
- Total assets: ▲US$2.668 billion (2020)
- Total equity: ▲US$191.1 million (2020)
- Number of employees: 5,350 (2023)
- Parent: Macquarie Infrastructure and Real Assets
- Subsidiaries: Cincinnati Bell Telephone; Cincinnati Bell Any Distance; Agile Networks; Hawaiian Telcom
- Website: www.altafiber.com

Cincinnati Bell, Inc., doing business as Altafiber, is a regional telecommunications service provider based in Cincinnati, Ohio, United States. It provides landline telephone, fiber-optic Internet, and IPTV services through its subsidiaries Altafiber Home Phone and Hawaiian Telcom, which are the incumbent local exchange carriers for the Greater Cincinnati metropolitan area (aka "The Tri-State") and Hawaii. Other subsidiaries provide enterprise information technology services and long distance calling.

Cincinnati Bell was founded in 1873 as a telegraph company and for much of its history was a Bell System franchisee. In the 1990s, Cincinnati Bell expanded into Internet access and mobile phone services. The company divested its mobile phone service in 2014 to focus on enterprise and fiber-optic services. It was acquired in September 2021 by Australia's Macquarie Infrastructure and Real Assets, and began doing business as Altafiber in March 2022.

== History ==
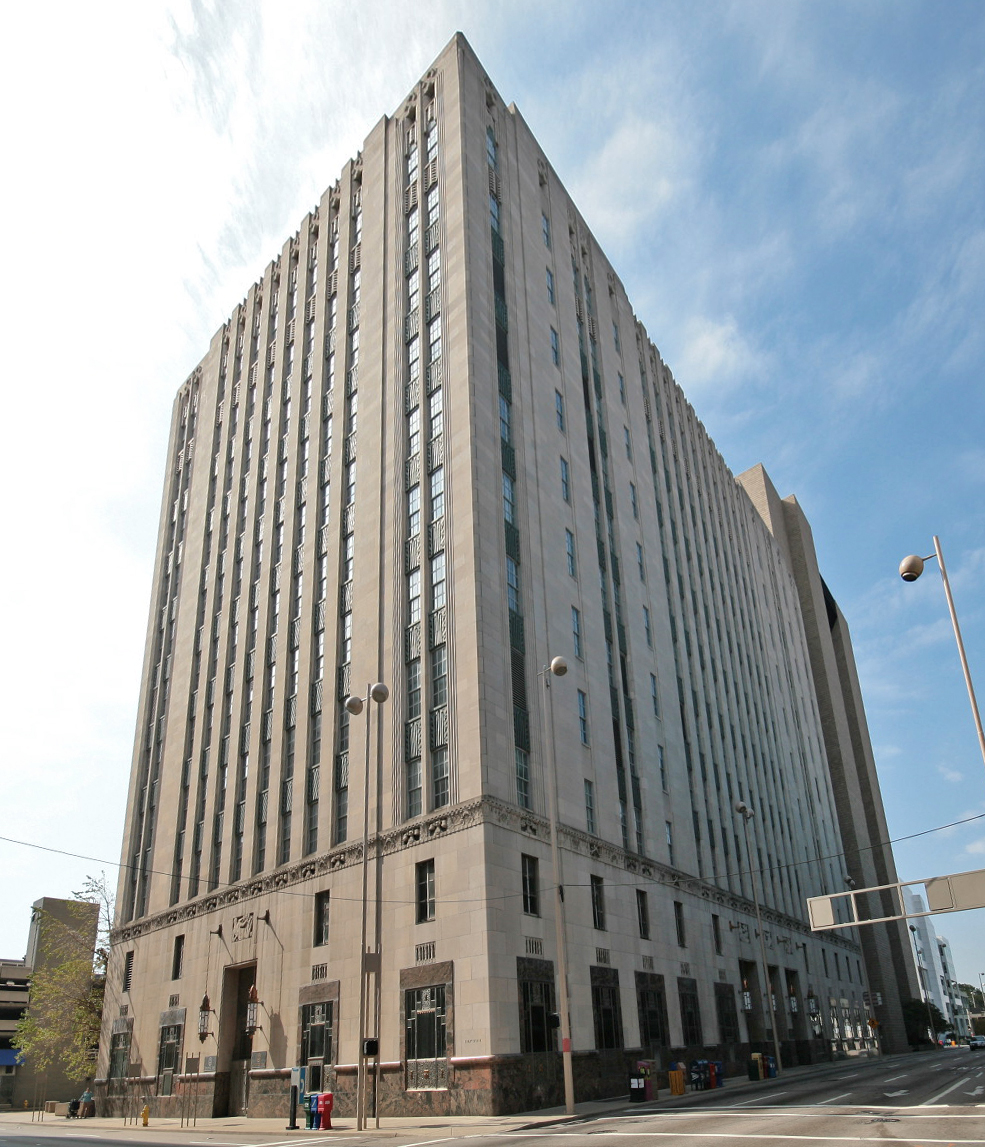
The Cincinnati and Suburban Telephone Company Building is a registered historic building.

Cincinnati Bell was founded as the City and Suburban Telegraph Association on July 5, 1873. Founder Charles Kilgour had run the Cincinnati Street Railway with his brother John but became homebound after an accident and began running his business from home via telegraph. The City and Suburban Telegraph Association ran telegraph lines between homes and businesses beginning in 1873, three years before the invention of the telephone. In 1878, it gained exclusive rights to the Bell franchise within a 25-mile (40 km) radius of Cincinnati, becoming the first telephone exchange in Ohio and the tenth in the United States. It has substantially the same three-state incumbent local exchange carrier territory today. On August 21, 1877, it signed its first telephone customer, the Cincinnati Gas-Light and Coke Company (later known as Cincinnati Gas and Electric).

The company was renamed Cincinnati and Suburban Bell Telephone Company in 1903.

From 1930 to 1952, the company converted its exchanges from staffed switchboards to dial service. Seven-digit dialing was introduced in 1962. In 1968, electromechanical switching equipment was replaced by one of the first electronic switching systems. The company formally simplified its name to Cincinnati Bell in 1971.

In May 1999, the Public Utilities Commission of Ohio awarded Cincinnati Bell Long Distance the right to offer local wireline telephone service in 55 counties outside its incumbent territory and the company began to resell business local phone service in these counties, in competition with incumbent carrier Ameritech.

During the 1990s, Cincinnati Bell acquired a nationwide transmission network formerly known as IXC Communications and changed its corporate name to "Broadwing Communications", although the local telephone operations continued to operate under the traditional Cincinnati Bell name. The acquisition fell short of expectations due to intense competition and lackluster demand and left Broadwing with over $2 billion in debt. In 2004, the holding company divested the long-distance operation as Broadwing Corporation and changed its name back to Cincinnati Bell. Broadwing Corporation was later acquired by Level 3 Communications.

In 2002, Cincinnati Bell sold Cincinnati Bell Directory, consisting of its directory operations, to Spectrum Equity. The resulting company is named CBD Media. The sale marked the first time a former Bell System-affiliated company had sold off its directory operations. In 2003, when BellSouth exited the payphone market, some former BellSouth payphones in Kentucky were sold to Cincinnati Bell.

In 2017, Cincinnati Bell acquired Toronto-based OnX Enterprise Solutions for $201 million. On July 2, 2018, Cincinnati Bell acquired Hawaiian Telcom Holdco, Inc., parent of local telephone company Hawaiian Telcom, for $650 million. The Hawaiian Telcom acquisition grew Cincinnati Bell's fiber network to over 14,000 route miles (23,000 km).

In September 2021, Cincinnati Bell was acquired by Macquarie Infrastructure and Real Assets.

On March 2, 2022, shortly after its acquisition by Macquarie, the company announced it would begin doing business as "Altafiber". The company's legal name, Cincinnati Bell Inc., was not immediately affected.

=== Relationship to the Bell System ===
Cincinnati Bell's residential landline service continued to use the 1969 Saul Bass-designed classic Bell logo until 2016.

Cincinnati Bell and Southern New England Telephone (SNET) were the only two companies in the old Bell System in which AT&T Corporation only owned minority stakes. Therefore, neither was considered a Regional Bell Operating Company (RBOC) for regulatory purposes, restrictions placed on the Baby Bells did not apply to these two companies, and AT&T was not obligated to dispose of their ownership stakes in the companies. AT&T owned 32.6% of Cincinnati Bell until 1984, at which point the shares AT&T owned were placed into a trust and then sold.

Cincinnati Bell was, from 2006 to 2022, the only former Bell System company that continued to publicly do business under the "Bell" name. In July 2006, Cincinnati Bell removed the final iteration of the Bell logo—designed in 1969 by Saul Bass—from most of its corporate branding, leaving only a stylized wordmark. However, the company continued to use the Bell logo in promotional materials for residential landline and long-distance service until it adopted a new logo in 2016.

== Service area ==
Cincinnati Bell's conventional telecommunications services are concentrated in markets where its subsidiaries have historically enjoyed incumbent local exchange carrier (ILEC) status. Since the 1870s, Cincinnati Bell Telephone has been the ILEC within a radius of approximately 25 miles (40 km) from downtown Cincinnati. As of 2019, the three-state territory consists of:

- Hamilton County, most of Clermont and Butler counties, and a small part of Warren County in Ohio
- Boone, Campbell, Gallatin, Grant, Kenton, and Pendleton counties in Kentucky
- West Harrison, Indiana

Beyond its ILEC territory, Cincinnati Bell Telephone additionally serves Mason, Lebanon, and the Dayton metropolitan area through its subsidiary Cincinnati Bell Extended Territories. Hawaiian Telcom, which Cincinnati Bell acquired in 2018, is the ILEC for the entire state of Hawaii.

OnX provides enterprise IT solutions in the United States, Canada, and United Kingdom.

== Services ==
Cincinnati Bell has historically focused on traditional landline service, but in recent decades it has expanded into adjacent communications and entertainment services. As of 2017, legacy voice service makes up only a quarter of the company's revenue.

=== Landline service ===
Cincinnati Bell provides landline PSTN local and long-distance calling. Subscriptions to these traditional services have declined steadily over the past decade due to competition from cable and wireless providers. By 2017, legacy voice service accounted for only a quarter of the company's revenue. Between 2014 and 2015, overall voice lines fell approximately 4% year-over-year, a trend the company projected would continue at a similar rate.

=== Internet access ===
Cincinnati Bell offers Internet access to customers in its service area. Its primary competitor for broadband Internet access is Charter Spectrum Internet.

=== Fiber optics ===
In late 2009, Cincinnati Bell started offering a fiber-optic communications (Internet, telephone, and IPTV) service called Fioptics, similar to the U-verse service offered by AT&T and the FiOS service offered by Verizon Communications. Cincinnati Bell's Fioptics provides Internet at speeds from 5 Mbit/s up to 2 Gbit/s to over 500,000 homes in the Cincinnati metropolitan area. The availability is limited to areas wired for Fioptics, and other Fioptics services are not required. In areas now covered by Fioptics, Cincinnati Bell no longer offers ADSL-only speeds greater than 5 Mbit/s.

As of 2019, Cincinnati Bell's fiber optic network extends nearly 16,500 route miles (26,600 km).

=== Electricity ===
In 2011, Cincinnati Bell became the first telecommunications company to also provide retail energy service. Through a partnership with Viridian Energy, Cincinnati Bell Energy competes with several other alternative electricity retailers for the power generation portion of customers' electricity bills. The subsidiary advertises that its service is entirely sourced from National Wind.

== Former services ==
=== Wireless telephony ===
From 1998 until 2015, Cincinnati Bell Wireless (CBW) offered GSM wireless service in southeastern Indiana, southwestern Ohio, and northern Kentucky. It was sold at Best Buy, Circuit City (until 2009), Office Depot, and participating Kroger locations. It offered HSPA+ service in most of Hamilton County, Ohio, and parts of surrounding counties; EDGE service in Dayton and Oxford; and GSM service elsewhere. The local coverage area extended north to Celina and Urbana, east to Hillsboro, south to Corinth and Warsaw, and west to Batesville. Cincinnati Bell's prepaid mobile phone products were sold under the same i-wireless brand as an unrelated service by locally based Kroger.

Cincinnati Bell made its first foray into wireless telephony around 1986, when it acquired a 45% stake in Ameritech Cellular. On February 2, 1998, Cincinnati Bell acquired 80% of AT&T Wireless Services's new Cincinnati-Dayton PCS network for over $100 million. Cincinnati Bell's subsidiary Cincinnati Bell Wireless was responsible for marketing and sales, while AT&T Wireless handled technical operations for the joint venture. Wireless service began by June in Cincinnati and by September in Dayton, eventually covering a 21-county area. When AT&T Wireless was purchased by Cingular, now known as AT&T Mobility, control of its 20% stake also passed to Cingular. On February 17, 2006, Cincinnati Bell took full control of CBW by purchasing Cingular's stake for $83 million. As a part of the deal, Cincinnati Bell and Cingular secured lower roaming charges on each other's respective GSM networks.

On April 7, 2014, Cincinnati Bell announced plans to sell its wireless spectrum and other assets to Verizon Wireless, as part of a planned emphasis on enterprise and entertainment services such as Fioptics. Cincinnati Bell Wireless ended service on February 28, 2015, and the company's retail locations began selling Verizon products.

=== Directories ===
Like other Bell System–affiliated companies, Cincinnati Bell published a series of local telephone directories, beginning in 1879. In 2002, it spun off these operations as CBD Media.

== Retail presence ==
Cincinnati Bell originally operated a chain of Cincinnati Bell Phone Center locations until 1992, when it sold the retail chain to AT&T. It reentered the retail space in 1998 with three Store@Cincinnati Bell retail locations. As of 2018, the company operates nine Cincinnati Bell Stores.

== Downtown Cincinnati presence ==
Cincinnati Bell's headquarters are located in the Atrium Two building on 4th Street in Downtown Cincinnati.

The company's former headquarters and telephone exchange on 7th Street is known as the Cincinnati and Suburban Telephone Company Building. It was added to the National Register of Historic Places in 1995. Next door is a data center operated by CyrusOne, a former Cincinnati Bell subsidiary. It originally opened in 1975 as Cincinnati Bell's central Switching Center.

Cincinnati Bell owns the naming rights to the Cincinnati Bell Connector streetcar line that traverses the downtown area. In August 2016, Cincinnati Bell paid $3.4 million to rename the line for 10 years. From 2007 to 2014 Cincinnati Bell also sponsored the annual Cincinnati Bell/WEBN Riverfest, one of the largest fireworks displays in the Midwest.

== See also ==
- Ohio Bell
