= Engels Maps =

Engels Maps Inc.
- *****
- Type: Private
- Industry: publishing, travel, transportation
- Founded: Fort Thomas, KY (1994)
- Founder: Judson Engels, Nathan Engels
- Headquarters: Fort Thomas, Kentucky
- Products: maps, atlases,
- Website: engelsmaps.com

Engels Maps is a map company in the Ohio Valley with particular concentration on the Cincinnati-Dayton region. It also produces chamber of commerce maps.

== Publications ==
It has three semi-annual publications that form its foundation:

- Cincinnati Engels Guide
- Dayton Engels Guide
- Indianapolis Engels Guide

Their maps are also found in the Cincinnati Bell Yellow Pages and the Dayton WorkBook.

== Corporate history ==
Engels Maps was founded by Judson Engels in 1994.
