= Brownsville affair =

1906 incident of racial injustice in Texas, US

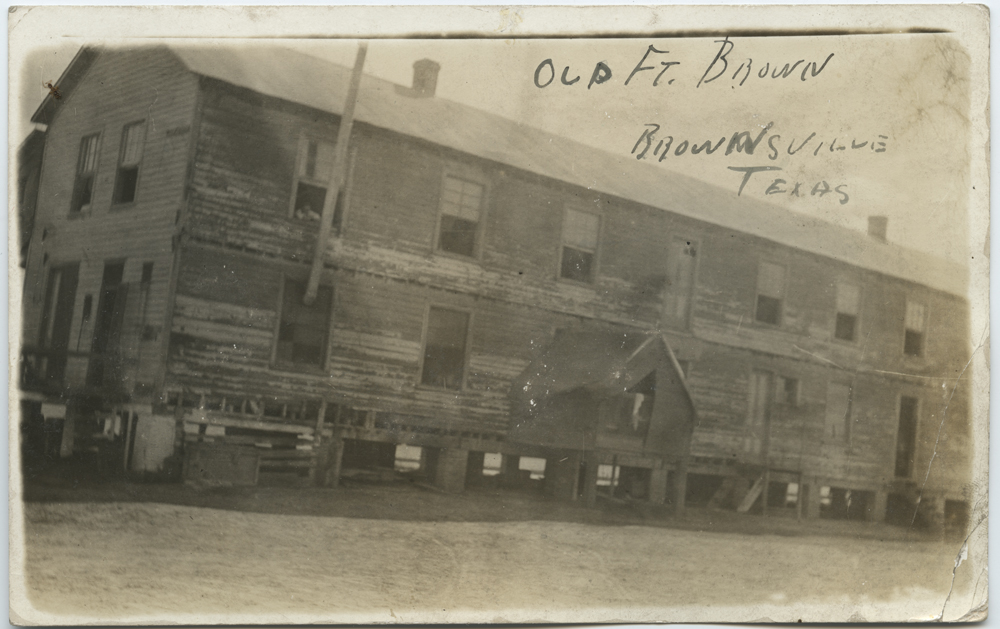
- Fort Brown, where the 25th Infantry were stationed at the time of the Brownsville affair
- Date: August 1906
- Location: Brownsville, Texas, United States
- Also known as: Brownsville raid, Affray at Brownsville
- Deaths: 1

The Brownsville affair, or the Brownsville raid, was an incident of racial discrimination that occurred in 1906 in the Southwestern United States due to resentment by white residents of Brownsville, Texas, of the Buffalo Soldiers, black soldiers in a segregated unit stationed at nearby Fort Brown. When a white bartender was killed and a white police officer wounded by gunshots one night, townspeople accused the members of the African-American 25th Infantry Regiment. Although their commanders said the soldiers had been in the barracks all night, evidence was allegedly planted against the men.

As a result of a United States Army Inspector General's investigation, President Theodore Roosevelt ordered the discharge without honor of 167 soldiers of the 25th Infantry Regiment, costing them pensions and preventing them from ever serving in federal civil service jobs. The case aroused national outrage in both black and white communities. After more investigation, several of the men were allowed to re-enlist.

Following publication of a history of the affair in the early 1970s, a renewed military investigation exonerated the discharged black troops. The government pardoned the men in 1972 and restored their records to show honorable discharges, but it did not provide retroactive compensation to them or their descendants. Only one man had survived to that time; Congress passed an act to provide him with a tax-free pension. The other soldiers who had been expelled all received posthumous honorable discharges.

== Background ==
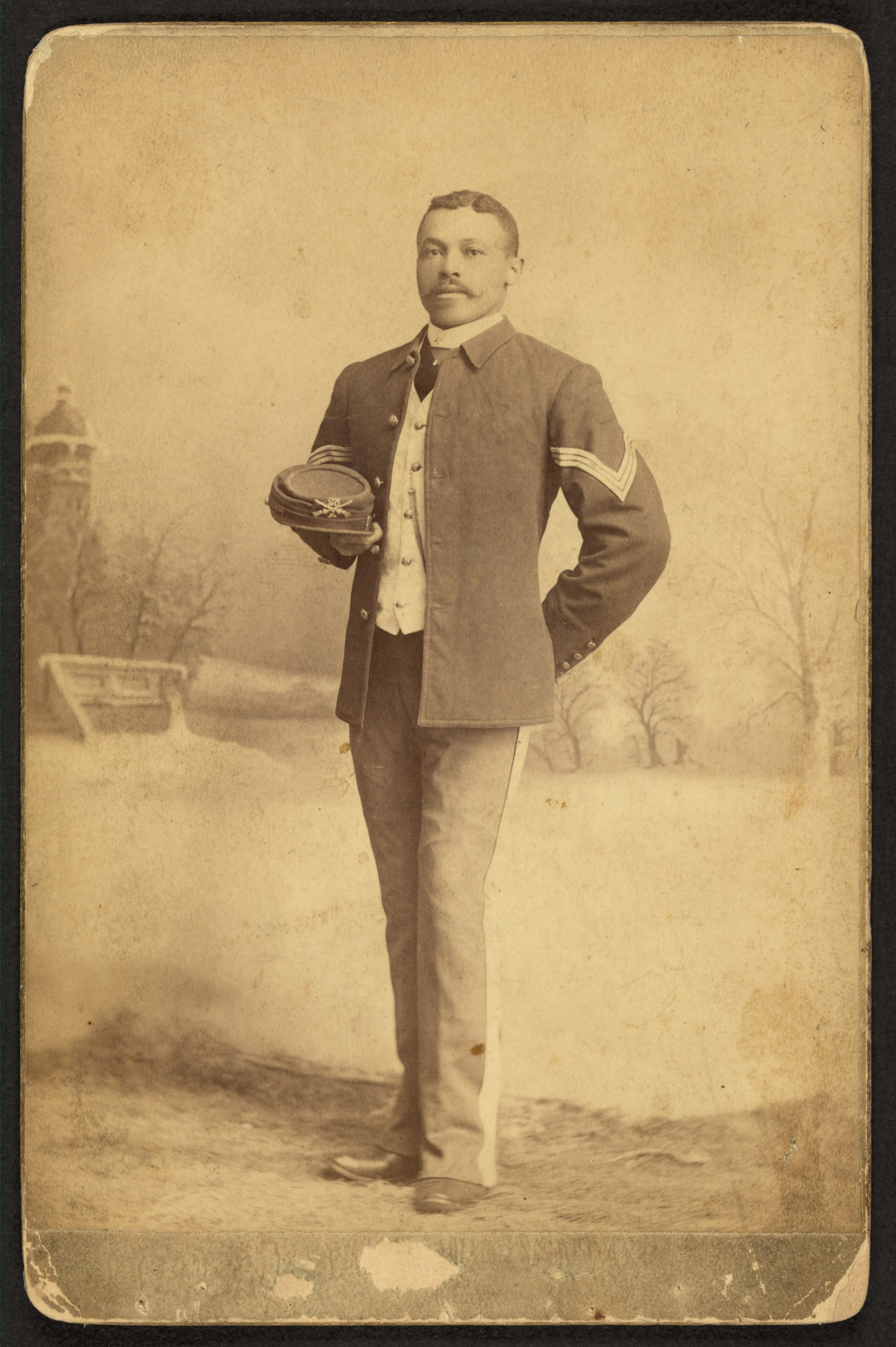
Soldier of the 25th Infantry (photo c. 1884–90)

Since arriving at Fort Brown on July 28, 1906, the black US soldiers had been required to follow the legal color line mandate from white citizens of Brownsville, which included the state's racial segregation law dictating separate accommodation for black people and white people, and Jim Crow customs such as showing respect for white people, as well as respect for local laws.

== August 12–13, 1906 ==
A reported rape of a white woman during the night of August 12 incensed so many townspeople that Major Charles W. Penrose (soldier), after consultation with Mayor Frederick Combe, declared an early curfew for soldiers the following night to avoid trouble.

On the night of August 13, 1906, bartender Frank Natus was killed and police lieutenant M. Yonacio (“Joe”) Dominguez was wounded by gunshots in the town. Immediately the residents of Brownsville cast the blame on the black soldiers of the 25th Infantry at Fort Brown. But the all-white commanders at Fort Brown confirmed that all of the soldiers were in their barracks at the time of the shootings. Local whites, including Brownsville's mayor, still claimed that some of the black soldiers participated in the shooting.

== Evidence ==
Local townspeople of Brownsville began providing evidence of the 25th Infantry's part in the shooting by producing spent bullet cartridges from Army rifles which they said belonged to the 25th's men. Townspeople spoke of hearing the sounds of pistols being fired. Major Penrose, the battalion commander was awakened by the distinct sound of pistols being fired. The soldier's pistols, however were secured in the armory on the post in their shipping cases and under lock and key and could not have been used by soldiers firing in the town. The pistol fire heard by both civilians and soldiers was the clearest indication that the source of the fire was from the civilians in town. He sent Captain Edgar Macklin, commanding officer of Company C, to look for evidence in town. Looking for spent cartridges, Macklin found rifle cartridges on ground on the town side of Garrison Road, about thirty feet away from the hip level wall separating the post from the town. Upon closer inspection, Macklin saw they were for the US Army's Springfield rifle, issued to the Twenty-Fifth Infantry back at their former post, Fort Niobrara. The seven empty shells were “all in a bunch,” as Macklin described them, in a circle not more than twelve to fifteen inches in diameter. This immediately looked suspicious. Had the bullets been fired from a rifle, the shells would be scattered in a haphazard manner. Such a tight pattern as he had found on the ground would have been impossible. This clearly looked like planted false evidence.

Despite the contradictory evidence that demonstrated the spent shells were planted in order to frame men of the 25th Infantry in the shootings and the reported civilian pistol shots, investigators accepted the statements of the local whites and the Brownsville mayor.

== Outcome ==
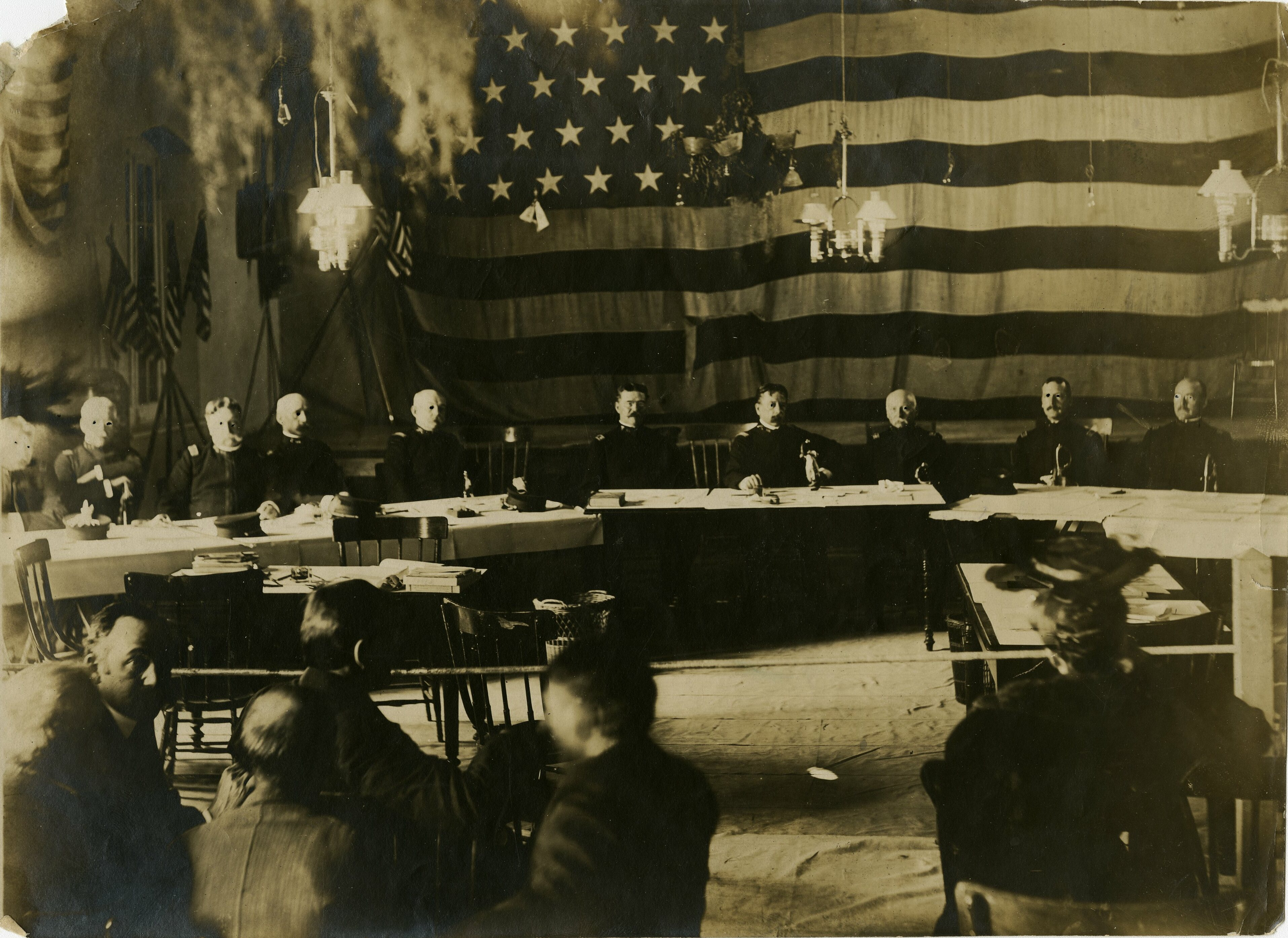
Court martial of Major Penrose, February 1907

When soldiers of the 25th Infantry were pressured to name who fired the shots, they insisted that they had no idea who had committed the crime. Captain Bill McDonald of the Texas Rangers investigated 12 enlisted men and tried to tie the case to them. The local county court did not return any indictments based on his investigation, but residents kept up complaints about the black soldiers of the 25th.

At the recommendation of the Army's Inspector General Ernest Garlington, President Theodore Roosevelt ordered 167 of the black troops to be discharged without honor because of their "conspiracy of silence". Although some accounts have claimed that six of the troops were Medal of Honor recipients, historian Frank N. Schubert showed that none were. Fourteen of the men were later reinstated into the army. The order of discharge without honor, distinct from a "dishonorable discharge" handed down by a general court-martial, deprived the soldiers from their right to retire on three-fourths pay.

The prominent African-American educator and activist, Booker T. Washington, president of Tuskegee Institute, got involved in the case. He asked President Roosevelt to reconsider his decision in the affair. Roosevelt dismissed Washington's plea and allowed his decision to stand.

Major Penrose was subject to a court martial for "neglect of duty, to the prejudice of good order and military discipline"; McDonald accusing him of trying to shield his soldiers from prosecution. During the trial, which lasted from February 4 to March 23, 1907, Penrose called McDonald a "contemptible coward". Penrose was acquitted of the charge.

== Congressional intervention ==
The black community was outraged at Roosevelt's actions and began to turn against him, although it had previously supported the Republican president (in addition to maintaining loyalty to the party of Abraham Lincoln, black people approved of Roosevelt having invited Booker T. Washington to dinner at the White House and speaking out publicly against lynching). The administration withheld news of the dishonorable discharge of the soldiers until after the 1906 Congressional elections, so that the pro-Republican black vote would not be affected. The case became a political football, with William Howard Taft, positioning for the next candidacy for presidency, trying to avoid trouble.

Leaders of major black organizations, such as the Constitution League, the National Association of Colored Women, and the Niagara Movement, tried to persuade the administration not to discharge the soldiers, but were unsuccessful. From 1907 to 1908, the US Senate Military Affairs Committee investigated the Brownsville Affair, and the majority in March 1908 reached the same conclusion as Roosevelt. Senator Joseph B. Foraker of Ohio had lobbied for the investigation and filed a minority report in support of the soldiers' innocence. Another minority report by four Republicans concluded that the evidence was too inconclusive to support the discharges. In September 1908, prominent educator and leader W. E. B. DuBois urged black people to register to vote and to remember their treatment by the Republican administration when it was time to vote for president. DuBois instead endorsed Woodrow Wilson and his New Freedom platform. DuBois ultimately retracted the endorsement after the Wilson Administration's segregation of the federal bureaucracy and Wilson's own private screening praise for The Birth of a Nation.

Feelings across the nation remained high against the government actions, but with Taft succeeding Roosevelt as president, and Foraker failing to win re-election, some of the political pressure declined.

On February 23, 1909, the Committee on Military Affairs recommended favorably on Bill S.5729 for correction of records and reenlistment of officers and men of Companies B, C, and D of the 25th Infantry

Senator Foraker continued to work on the Brownsville affair during his remaining time in office, guiding a resolution through Congress to establish a board of inquiry with the power to reinstate the soldiers. The bill, which the administration did not oppose, was less than Foraker wanted. He had hoped for a requirement that unless specific evidence was shown against a man, he would be allowed to re-enlist. The legislation passed both houses, and was signed by Roosevelt on March 2, 1909.

On March 6, 1909, shortly after he left the Senate, Foraker was the guest of honor at a mass meeting at Washington's Metropolitan African Methodist Episcopal Church. Though both whites and African Americans assembled to recognize the former senator, all the speakers but Foraker were African American. Presented with a silver loving cup, he addressed the crowd,

I have said that I do not believe that a man in that battalion had anything to do with the shooting up of "Brownsville," but whether any one of them had, it was our duty to ourselves as a great, strong, and powerful nation to give every man a hearing, to deal fairly and squarely with every man; to see to it that justice was done to him; that he should be heard.

On April 7, 1909, under the provisions of the Act of March 30, 1909, a Military Court of Inquiry was set up by Secretary of War Jacob M. Dickinson to report on the charges and recommend for reenlistment those men who had been discharged under Special Order # 266, November 9, 1906. Of the 167 discharged men, 76 were located as witnesses, and 6 did not wish to appear.

The 1910 Court of Military Inquiry undertook an examination of the soldiers' bids for re-enlistment, in view of the Senate committee's reports, but its members interviewed only about one-half of the soldiers discharged. It accepted 14 for re-enlistment, and eleven of these re-entered the Army.

The government did not re-examine the case until the early 1970s.

== Later investigation and presidential pardon in 1970s ==
In 1970, historian John D. Weaver published The Brownsville Raid, which investigated the affair in depth. Weaver argued that the accused members of the 25th Infantry were innocent and that they were discharged without benefit of due process of law as guaranteed by the United States Constitution. After reading his book, Congressman Augustus F. Hawkins of Los Angeles introduced a bill to have the Defense Department re-investigate the matter to provide justice to the accused soldiers.

In 1972, the Army found the accused members of the 25th Infantry to be innocent. At its recommendations, President Richard Nixon pardoned the men and awarded them honorable discharges, without backpay. These discharges were generally issued posthumously, as there were only two surviving soldiers from the affair: one had re-enlisted in 1910. In 1973, Hawkins and Senator Hubert Humphrey gained congressional passage of a tax-free pension for the last survivor, Dorsie Willis, who received $25,000. He was honored in ceremonies in Washington, DC, and Los Angeles.
