= CBD Media =

Directory and advertising division of Cincinnati Bell

CBD Media LLC
- Company type: Subsidiary of The Berry Company
- Industry: Telephone directory
- Products: Print Yellow Pages, Online Yellow Pages ads
- Parent: Spectrum Equity, etc. (2002-2007); The Berry Company|Local Insight Media/Berry (2007-present)

CBD Media LLC (formerly Cincinnati Bell Directory) is a division of Local Insight Media that publishes telephone directories under the Cincinnati Bell name.

== History ==
The company was created in 2002 following the sale of Cincinnati Bell Directory to a consortium led by Spectrum Equity.

CBD Media publishes the Cincinnati Bell Yellow Pages, which consists of 15 directories, published under the "Real Pages" name. CBD Media also operates CincinnatiBellYellowPages.com, the electronic yellow pages directory for Cincinnati Bell.

The company was acquired by Local Insight Media Holdings in 2007. Local Insight Media owned Local Insight Yellow Pages, the former directory division of Windstream.

In 2009, Local Insight acquired The Berry Company from AT&T, and changed its own name to The Berry Company LLC.

== See also ==
- Engels Maps
