= National Wind =

Wind energy projects by Trishe Group

National Wind LLC
- Type: Private
- Industry: Wind energy
- Founded: 2003
- Headquarters: Minneapolis, Minnesota, US
- Number of employees: 50
- Website: nationalwind.com

National Wind, LLC, A Trishe Group of Company, is a Minneapolis company founded in 2003 that is a developer of large-scale, community-based wind energy projects. The company, along with National Wind Assessments, has 50 employees based in Minneapolis, MN and Grand Forks, North Dakota. National Wind claims to be the nation's leading developer of community-based wind farms.

== Community-based model ==
National Wind operates under a community-based business model. Each wind project is structured as its own limited liability company (LLC) and is formed as a partnership between National Wind and local community members and landowners. Although National Wind is generally the developer and manager of its wind projects, it shares ownership of each project company with members of the communities where the wind farm is located. National Wind highlights the benefits of the community model, saying that community ownership benefits local economies along with the environment.

National Wind's business model differs from the structure of most other wind developers. Traditionally, when a company builds a wind farm, they become the sole owners of the development. The owners of the land where the farm is built tend to have minimal involvement with projects developer. In the traditional model, landowners do not own shares of the wind project, but instead are either paid a monthly lease or given royalties from the sale of electricity. On the other hand, National Wind's model aims to share both revenue and influence within local communities.

== Projects ==
National Wind develops and manages wind farms that produce, at minimum, 50 megawatts of renewable energy. Most of the company's developments are located in the Midwestern United States in Iowa, Minnesota, North Dakota, South Dakota, Colorado, and Ohio. Currently, National Wind has twelve families of utility-scale wind projects in development or operation.

- Emmet County Energy LLC (NorthStar Wind Farms) – Formed in 2005, so-called NorthStar wind project is a 250 megawatt development. The development is located in Emmet County and Dickinson County in Iowa. The acquisition of a right of way for a short transmission line to connect the project with the grid in Jackson, Minnesota, has been completed.
- M-Power LLC – Formed in 2006, M-Power is a 169.5 megawatt family of projects located in Griggs County and Steele County, North Dakota. M-Power is North Dakota's largest community-owned wind energy development to date.**National Wind completed its involvement in April 2009 and is no longer associated with M-Power.
- High Country Energy LLC – Formed in 2007, High Country Energy is a 300 megawatt project located in Dodge County and Olmsted County, Minnesota.
- Jeffers Wind Energy Center – Located in Cottonwood County, Minnesota, construction of the first 50 megawatt phase was completed in 2008 and turbines are generating electricity. National Wind no longer retains an ownership interest in the Jeffers project.
- Dakota Wind Energy LLC – Also formed in 2007, Dakota Wind Energy is National Wind's largest planned development. The project, located in South Dakota, it the state's first large-scale community wind project at 750 megawatts.
- Root River Energy LLC – Formed in 2008, Root River Energy is a 300 megawatt family of developments in Fillmore County, Minnesota.
- Lake Country Wind Energy – A 340-megawatt family of wind projects formed in 2008 in Meeker County and Kandiyohi County, Minnesota.
- NECO Wind – Colorado's largest community wind development, NECO Wind is developing 650 MW of wind energy in Northeast Colorado in Sedgwick County, Phillips County, and Logan County.
- Goodhue Wind – The 78-megawatt community wind project is being developed by National Wind in Goodhue County, Minnesota.
- Red Rock Wind Energy – Many of the community members involved in Emmet County Energy decided to capture more of the potential wind energy in Emmet County and Dickinson County and formed Red Rock Wind Energy in 2008 to develop another 300 MW of wind energy in the two Iowa counties.
- Little Rock Wind – A 150-megawatt family of community wind projects in Big Stone County, Minnesota.
- Northwest Ohio Wind Energy – Northwest Ohio Wind Energy formed in early 2009 after a local community group previously organized as Ohio Wind Energy, LLC, partnered with National Wind to develop 300 MW of community-based wind in Paulding County and Van Wert County in northwest Ohio.
- Norfolk Wind Energy – Farmers in Renville County, Minnesota, partnered with National Wind in early 2009 to develop 40 megawatts or more of community-based wind energy.

== Assessment division ==
National Wind Assessments, a subdivision of National Wind LLC, specializes in the planning, permitting, and overall design of wind farms. Based in North Dakota, the assessment team analyzes potential wind farm sites using met tower installation, wind data acquisition, and environmental impact studies.

== Media attention ==
Over the last few years, National Wind has garnered attention from a variety of local and national media outlets. On February 22, 2008, Minnesota’s largest newspaper, the Star Tribune, featured National Wind on the cover of the business section. National Wind has also been featured in Twin Cities Business, the Lincoln Star, and various other local publications.

CEO Leon Steinberg, representing one America's "leading wind-energy developers," was also cited in a July 2008 U.S. News & World Report article on the importance of the federal production tax credit for the growing industry.
