= Dorsie Willis =

American soldier wrongly discharged in the Brownsville affair (1886–1977)

- Willis in 1972
- Born: February 11, 1886; Meridian, Mississippi, U.S.
- Died: August 24, 1977 (aged 91); Minneapolis, Minnesota, U.S.
- Burial place: Fort Snelling National Cemetery; 44.87315537°N 93.214917°W
- Military career
- Branch: United States Army
- Service years: 1905–1906
- Rank: Private
- Unit: 25th Infantry Regiment
- Known for: Last survivor of the Brownsville affair

Dorsie William Willis (February 11, 1886 – August 25, 1977) was a United States Army soldier who was wrongly issued a dishonorable discharge in the Brownsville affair of 1906. Raised in Oklahoma, he served in the Army beginning in 1905 and was present when residents of Brownsville, Texas staged a series of shootings in their town that were falsely blamed on soldiers at nearby Fort Brown. Willis regained national attention in the 1970s when the 167 soldiers were pardoned, receiving an honorable discharge and a military pension. Willis was buried with full military honors at Fort Snelling National Cemetery.

== Early life ==
Dorsie William Willis was born in Meridian, Mississippi on February 11, 1886, the oldest child of sharecroppers Casey and Dochie Willis. The family left Mississippi for the Oklahoma Territory in 1889, settling in Guthrie. Willis left Oklahoma after dropping out of the sixth grade, and began working in Kansas City in 1902.

Willis returned to Oklahoma and joined the United States Army in 1905. He joined the 25th Infantry Regiment, a Buffalo Soldier regiment. He hoped to be assigned to the regiment's 2nd Battalion at Fort Reno, near his acquaintance Lucille Jordan. Instead, Willis was stationed at Fort Niobrara in Nebraska with the regiment's 1st Battalion. Willis and Jordan established a correspondence, and they planned to marry after his three-year service commitment ended.

== Army service and Brownsville affair ==
Fort Niobrara was abandoned in 1906, and most of the personnel of the 1st Battalion were transferred to Fort Brown in Brownsville, Texas that July. The soldiers of the 25th Infantry replaced a unit made up of white soldiers, which the residents of Brownsville resented. On the night of August 12, a Brownsville resident reported that she was assaulted by a soldier from the 25th Infantry, and an 8:00 PM curfew was imposed on the soldiers for the next evening.

On the night of August 13, Brownsville residents staged a raid on the town, which came to be known as the Brownsville affair. A bartender and the town's police chief were shot, and residents immediately accused the soldiers of the 25th Infantry of carrying out the shootings. The soldiers of the 25th Infantry were all present and accounted for at Fort Brown that evening, and no shots were fired from their guns. Multiple civilian and military investigations placed blame on the soldiers, despite the lack of evidence.

In November 1906, President Theodore Roosevelt signed an order to summarily dishonorably discharge all 167 soldiers that were present at Fort Brown that day, including Willis. Some of the 167 soldiers were accepted for re-enlistment into the Army in 1910 following advocacy from members of Congress, but Willis was not included.

== Later life in Minnesota ==
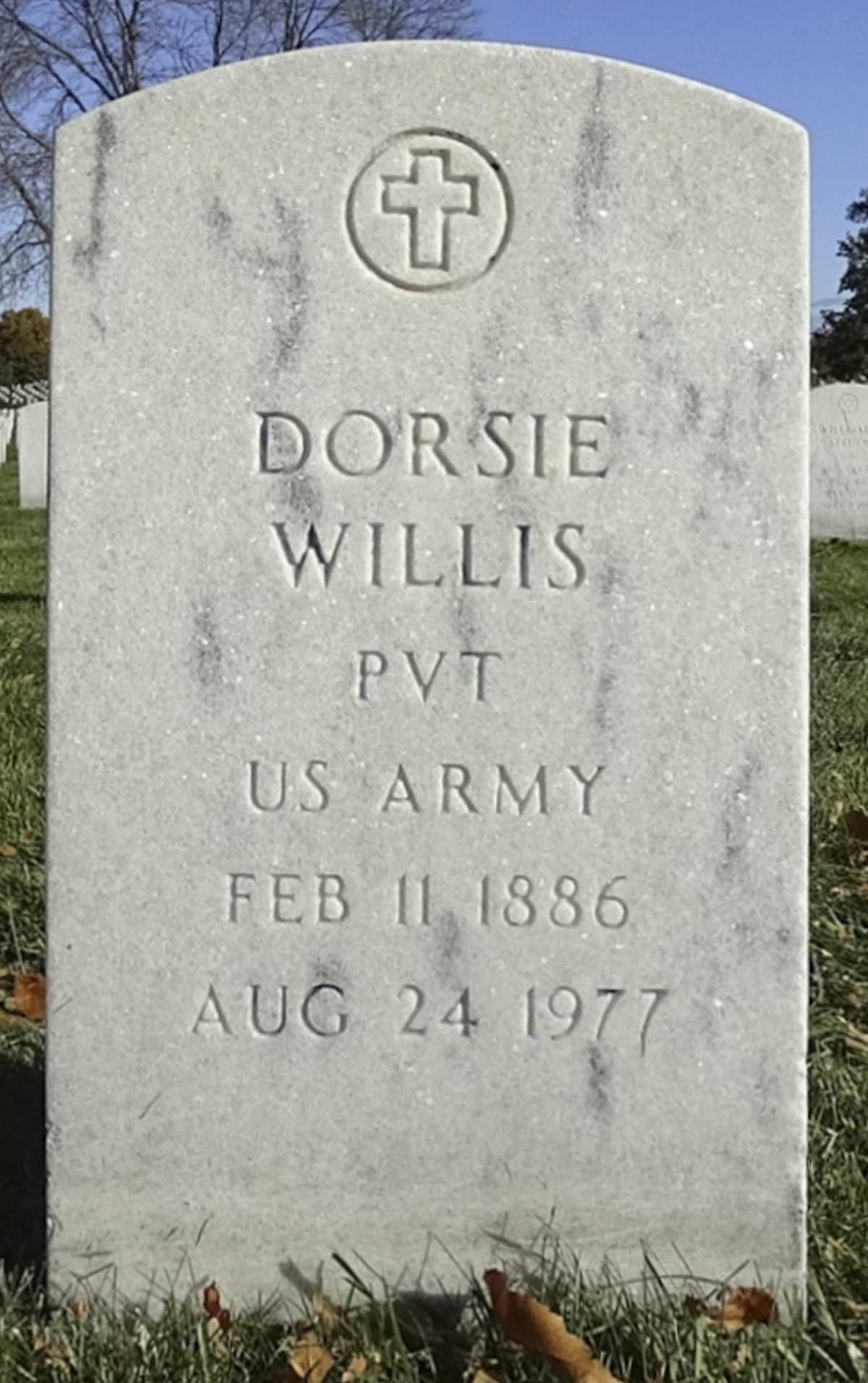
Willis' grave in Fort Snelling National Cemetery

Willis returned to Oklahoma after his discharge, where he and Jordan married. Their son Reginald Haines Willis was born in 1907, and the family moved to Kansas in 1910 before settling in Minneapolis in 1913. Willis' dishonorable discharge was an impediment to finding employment, and he took up work as a shoeshiner at a barbershop in Downtown Minneapolis.

Willis purchased a house on Minnehaha Avenue in the Longfellow community of Minneapolis in 1937, where he lived for the rest of his life. He was an active member of local social organizations and the Minneapolis NAACP chapter, and frequently traveled to visit family outside Minneapolis. Willis registered for the draft in 1942 at the age of 56, although he was not called up.

In the late 1950s, Willis began trying to overturn his dishonorable discharge, but was unsuccessful after the Department of Defense claimed that it could not verify his identity. The matter came back into public view after the 1970 publication of a book about the Brownsville affair by historian John D. Weaver, which prompted a Congressional investigation.

Willis received an honorable discharge in September 1972, backdated to 1906. At the time, he was one of two surviving veterans of the incident; the other, Edward Warfield, died in September 1973. Willis was awarded a lump sum pension of $25,000 in 1973 (equivalent to $181,000 in 2025) after the advocacy of Senator Hubert Humphrey and Representative Augustus Hawkins.

Willis died of kidney failure on August 24, 1977 in Minneapolis. He was buried in Fort Snelling National Cemetery with full military honors.
