= Nesta Bowen Horne =

Canadian painter (1896-1987)

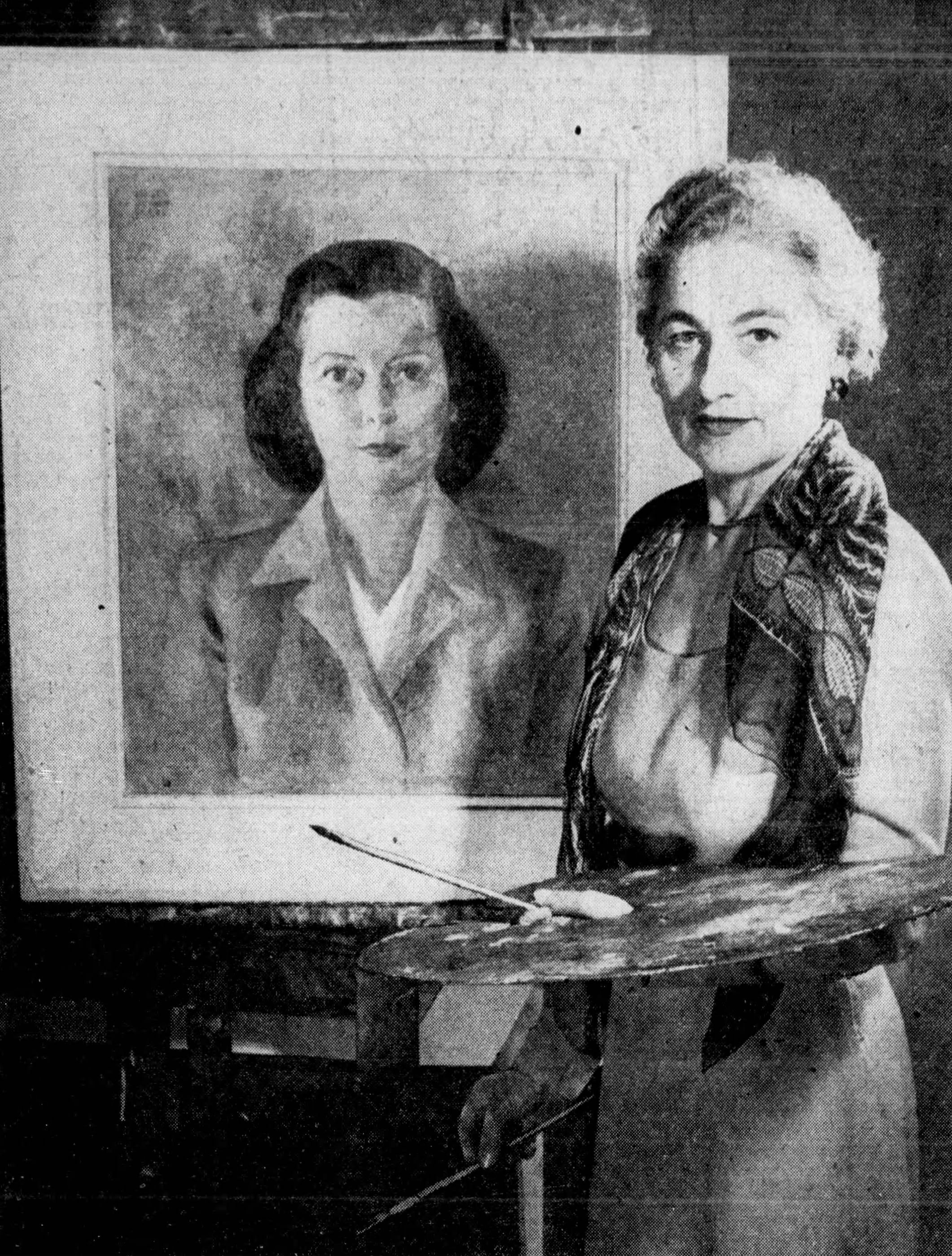
- Nesta Bowen Horne in 1948
- Born: Nesta Maud Mary Bowen; 9 February 1896; Bridgetown, Saint Michael, Barbados
- Died: 2 March 1987 (aged 91); Victoria, British Columbia, Canada
- Known for: Painting

Nesta Bowen Horne (1896–1987) was a Canadian painter. Born in Barbados, she trained in New York, Paris, and London. While she painted landscapes, floral subjects, and semi-abstracts, her specialty was portraiture. She had solo exhibitions at the Vancouver Art Gallery in 1944 and 1946, the latter show devoted exclusively to portraits.

== Biography ==
Nesta Maud Mary Bowen was born on 9 February 1896 in Bridgetown, Barbados, the daughter of a civil engineer and artist. She lived in New York for ten years where she attended the National Academy of Design. Horne further studied in Paris at the Académie Moderne under Charles Guérin. In London, she continued her education in portrait painting at the Goldsmith School with Harold Speed. In 1925, she married Thomas Horne in England. She immigrated to Canada in 1929, settling in Vancouver.

Starting in 1934, Horne sent works to the annual shows of the Vancouver Art Gallery. In 1940, she had a co-exhibition with Mabel Bain at the gallery, displaying portraits, landscapes, and floral subjects, which were particularly praised. Her scenes included a Japanese village along the Fraser River and Chinese market gardens. In 1941, Horne painted Mary Bollert, the first dean of women at the University of British Columbia. She began submitting pieces to the annual exhibitions with the British Columbia Society of Fine Arts. Horne portrayed Mary Laura Mah (Wong), who served with the Canadian Women's Army Corps. The pastel is now located in the Canadian War Museum.

In 1944, she had her first solo exhibition at the Vancouver Art Gallery, with oil paintings and watercolours of both still lifes and portraits. Horne also created semi-abstracts. In 1944 as well, she visited Victoria where she depicted men and women in uniform. An exhibition of many of these paintings occurred in 1945 at the Spencer's Art Gallery in Victoria. In 1946, Horne had another solo exhibition at the Vancouver Art Gallery, a rare show consisting only of portraits. Mildred Valley Thornton commended her paintings of children. In 1950, Horne was made a member of the National Arts Club in New York. By 1955, she lived most of the year at Pender Harbour. Horne continued painting into the 1960s. She died on 2 March 1987 in Victoria at the age of 91 years.

Besides British Columbia, Horne exibited in London, New York, Toronto, St. Catharines, and Washington, D.C. Her works are in the collections of the Morris and Helen Belkin Art Gallery, Burnaby Art Gallery, Canadian War Museum, and the Barbados Museum & Historical Society.
