= Evelyn Beatrice Longman =

American sculptor (1874–1954)

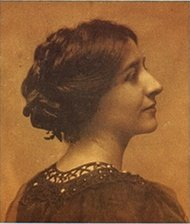
- Longman circa 1904
- Born: November 21, 1874; Winchester, Ohio
- Died: March 10, 1954 (aged 79); Osterville, Massachusetts
- Education: Olivet College; School of the Art Institute of Chicago
- Known for: Sculpture
- Spouse: Nathaniel Horton Batchelder (m. 1920)
- Elected: Member of the National Academy of Design (1919)

Evelyn Beatrice Longman (November 21, 1874 – March 10, 1954) was an American sculptor whose allegorical figure works were commissioned as monuments and memorials, adornment for public buildings, and attractions at art expositions in the early 20th-century. She became the first woman sculptor to be elected a full member of the National Academy of Design in 1919.

== Early life and education ==
The daughter of Edwin Henry and Clara Delitia (Adnam) Longman, she was born on a farm near Winchester, Ohio. At the age of 14, she earned a living working in a Chicago dry-goods store. At the 1893 World's Columbian Exposition, which she visited when she was almost 19 years old, Longman was inspired to become a sculptor. She attended Olivet College in Michigan for one year but returned to Chicago to study anatomy, drawing, and sculpture. Working under Lorado Taft at the School of the Art Institute of Chicago, she earned her diploma for the four-year course of study in only two years.

In 1901, Longman moved to New York, where she studied with Hermon Atkins MacNeil and Daniel Chester French. Her debut in large-scale public sculpture came at the 1904 Louisiana Purchase Exposition, where her male figure, Victory, was deemed so excellent in invention and technique that it was given a place of honor on the top of the fair's centerpiece building, Festival Hall. A smaller bronze version, a statuette dated 1903, was later located, and in 2007 was sold at auction for $7,800—a small price for a piece representing the hallmark of a celebrated sculptor.

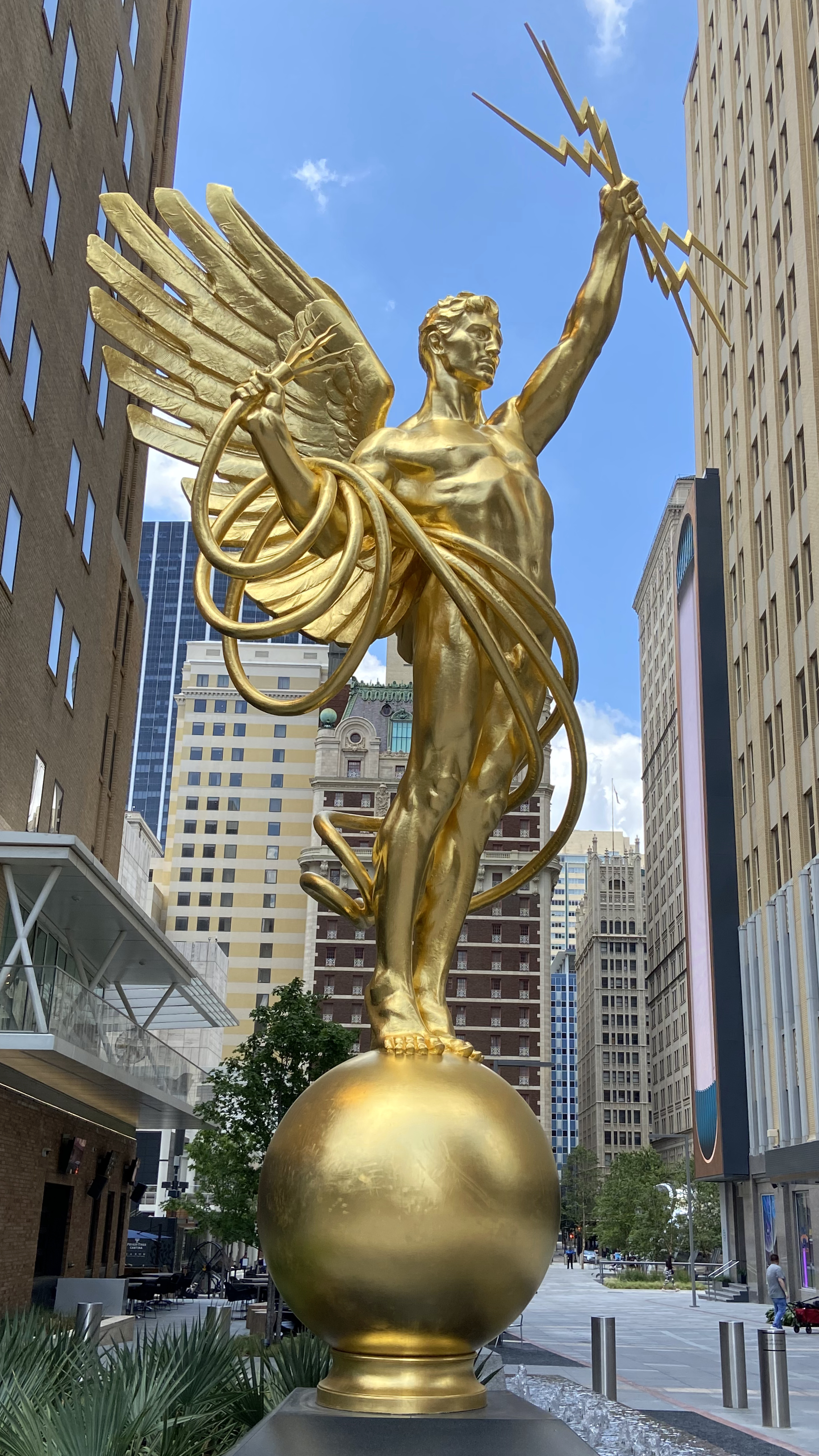
Spirit of Communication (1915), One AT&T Plaza, Dallas, Texas

== Career ==
Longman's 1915 Genius of Electricity, a gilded male nude later known as the Spirit of Communication, was commissioned by AT&T Corporation for the top of their corporate headquarters in downtown Manhattan. The figure was reproduced on Bell Telephone directories across the country from 1938 until the 1960s. Around 1920, Longman assisted Daniel Chester French and Henry Bacon by creating the sculptural decorations for the Lincoln Memorial in Washington, D.C. In 1923, she won the Watrous Gold Medal for best sculpture.

Longman is also often noted for sculpting the hands on the Lincoln Memorial, although this is not confirmed to be true. She assisted with many aspects of the Lincoln Memorial, but French himself modeled the hands.

In 1918, Longman was hired by Nathaniel Horton Batchelder, the headmaster of the Loomis Chaffee School, to sculpt a memorial to his late wife. Two years later, she married Batchelder, moving to Connecticut at the height of her career. During the next 30 years, Longman completed dozens of commissions, both architectural and independent works, throughout the United States. She was an active member of the Loomis Chaffee School, donating countless items that are currently held still at the school, as well as in the surrounding town.Her work was also part of the sculpture event in the art competition at the 1928 Summer Olympics.

After her husband's retirement, Longman moved her studio to Cape Cod, where she died in 1954.

After Longman's death, her husband is rumored to have scattered her ashes at Chesterwood, the home and studio of her former employer and mentor, Daniel Chester French.

== Major works ==
- Victory (1904), commissioned for the Louisiana Purchase Exposition in Saint Louis.
- Great Bronze Memorial (1909) chapel doors at the United States Naval Academy, Annapolis.
- Allegorical sculpture for the Foster Mausoleum and bronze bas-relief for Timothy Murphy memorial, Upper Middleburgh Cemetery, Middleburgh, New York
- Horsford doors (1910), the front entrance of Clapp Library at Wellesley College.
- Wreaths, eagles and inscriptions (1914) on the inner walls of the Lincoln Memorial, Washington, DC.
- Aenigma, bust of German actress Kate Parsenow.
- Genius of Electricity (1915), later known as Electricity and The Spirit of Communication or simply Spirit of Communication, was commissioned for the top of the AT&T skyscraper in New York City. It was later relocated to Bedminster, NJ, and then to the lobby of AT&T's Dallas, TX headquarters. Since April 2020, it has been at One AT&T Plaza.
- Fountain of Ceres (1915) in the Court of the Four Seasons at the Panama–Pacific International Exposition, San Francisco.
- L'Amour (1915) in the Palace of Fine Arts at the Panama–Pacific International Exposition San Francisco.
- Senator Allison Monument (1916) Des Moines, Iowa.
- Illinois Centennial Monument (1918), Chicago, IL.
- Spirit of Victory (1926), Spanish–American War Memorial in Bushnell Park, Hartford, Connecticut.
- Victory of Mercy (1947), Loomis Chaffee School, Windsor, CT.
- Edison (1952), 12.5 foot bronze portrait bust of Thomas Alva Edison in Washington D.C. at the Naval Research Laboratory.

== Other works ==
Two of Longman's bas relief sculptures serve as memorials in Lowell Cemetery in Lowell, Massachusetts. Her 1905 sculpture of a cloaked woman holding a finger to her lips adorns the grave of John Ansley Storey. Longman's Mill Girl sculpture, dedicated in 1906, memorializes Lowell mill worker Louisa Maria Wells.

In 1920, Longman carved the marble fountain in the lobby of the Heckscher Museum of Art. The young grandchildren of August Heckscher posed for the three small figures that serve as its focal point. An inscription around the rim reads, "Forever wilt thou love and they be fair."

A notable sculpture on the Windsor, Connecticut town green on Broad Street is the monument dedicated "To the Patriots of Windsor." Longman sculpted the large bronze eagle with partly spread wings bearing a wreath, atop a tall fieldstone pedestal, in 1928; it was dedicated in 1929. Her war shrine, Madonna and Child, is found in Windsor's Grace Episcopal Church, and was opened for community use in 1943. By the end of 1944, over 2,000 people had recorded their names on the shrine's register.

Another example of her work, The Craftsman, also known as Industry can be seen outside the main entrance of A. I. Prince Technical High School in Hartford, Connecticut (formerly known as Hartford Trade School). The statue, completed in 1931, was placed there in 1960 in honor of the industrial pioneers of Hartford. Sitting on a 16,000 pound granite foundation, the approximately 1,950 pound bronze sculpture remains an inspiration to students today.

Minneapolis Institute of Art collection includes Putto on a Seahorse, 1933 in bronze.

== Honors and awards ==
Evelyn Longman Batchelder was inducted into the Connecticut Women's Hall of Fame in 1994.

== Noted relative ==
Longman's niece was the noted Canadian portrait and landscaper painter Mildred Valley Thornton as related on her maternal line.

== Gallery ==
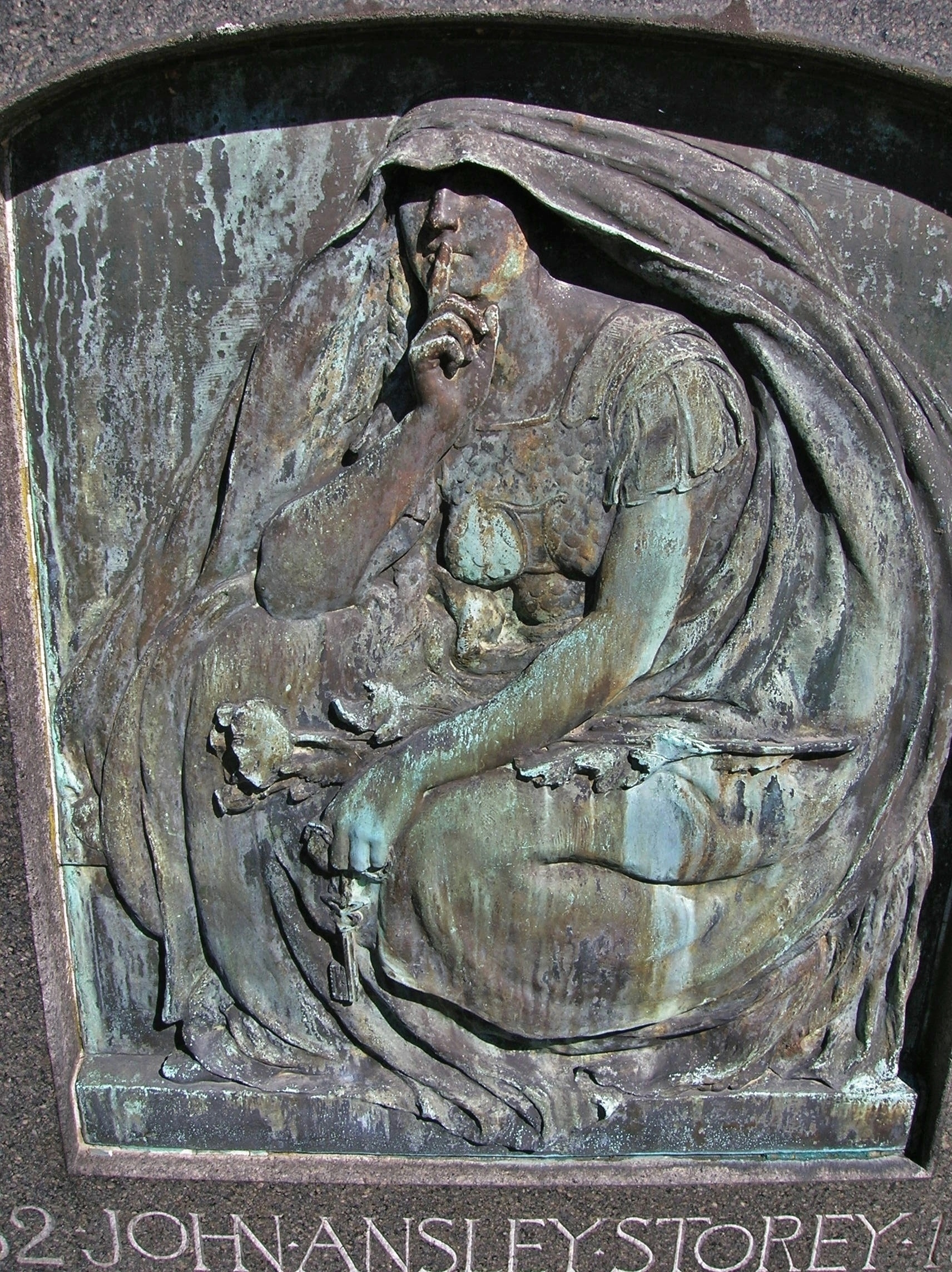
Storey Memorial (1905), Lowell Cemetery, Lowell, Massachusetts

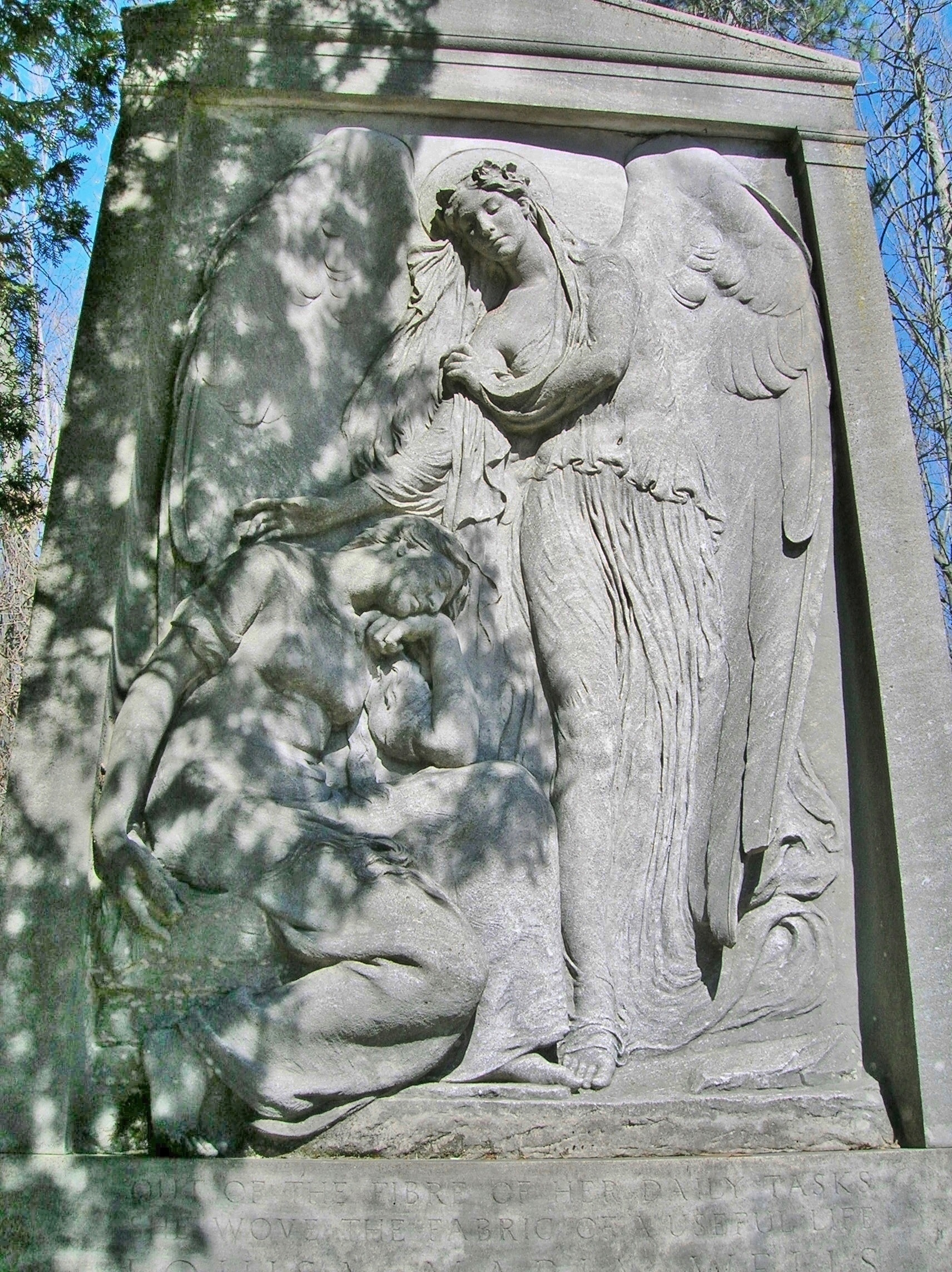
Mill Girl monument to Louisa Maria Wells (1906), Lowell Cemetery, Lowell, Mass.

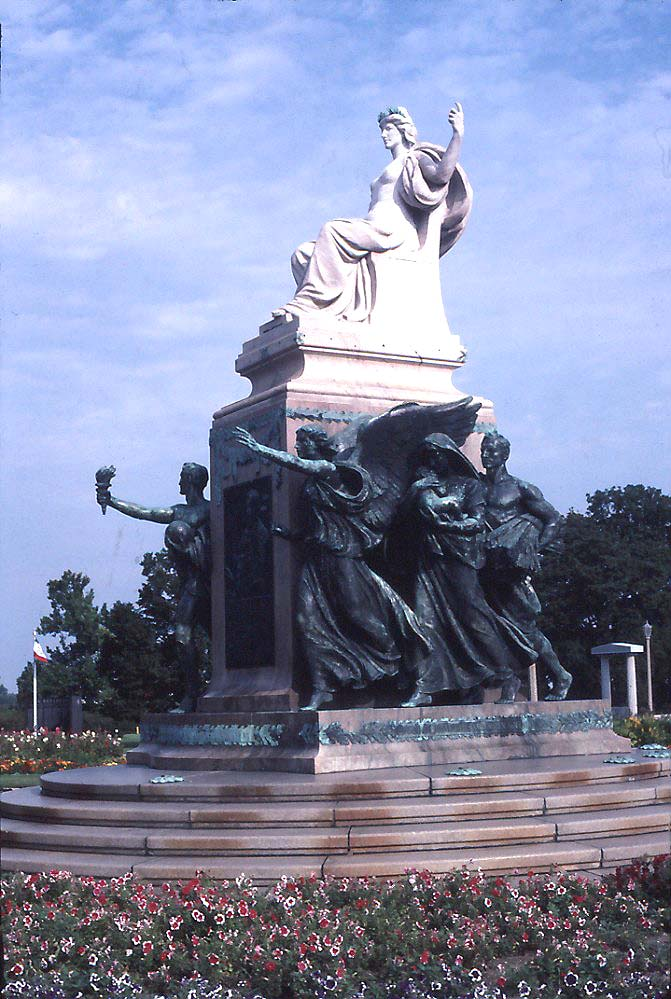
Sen. William Boyd Allison Monument (1916), Des Moines, Iowa

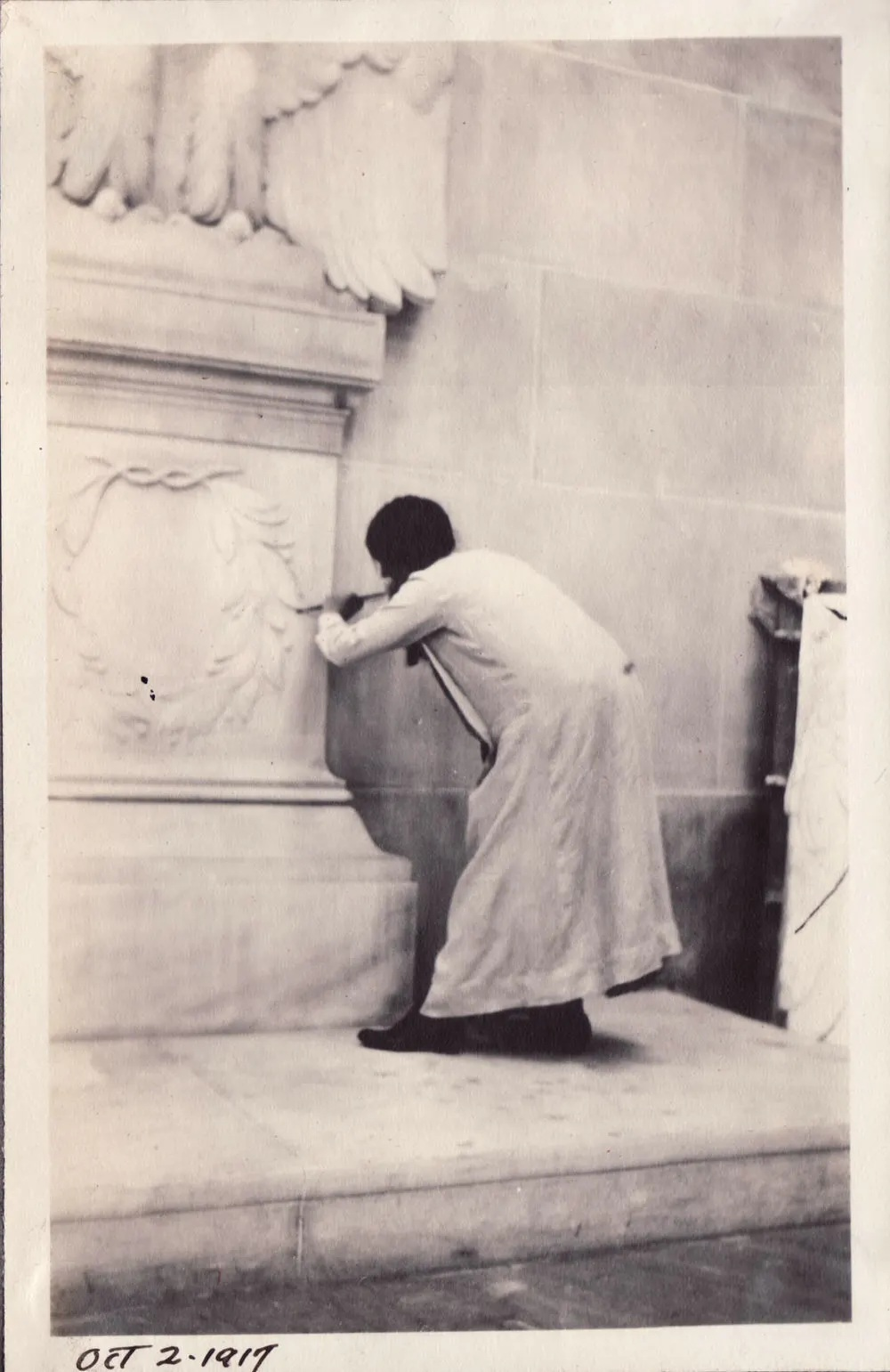
Carving a wreath on the Lincoln Memorial
(October 2, 1917)

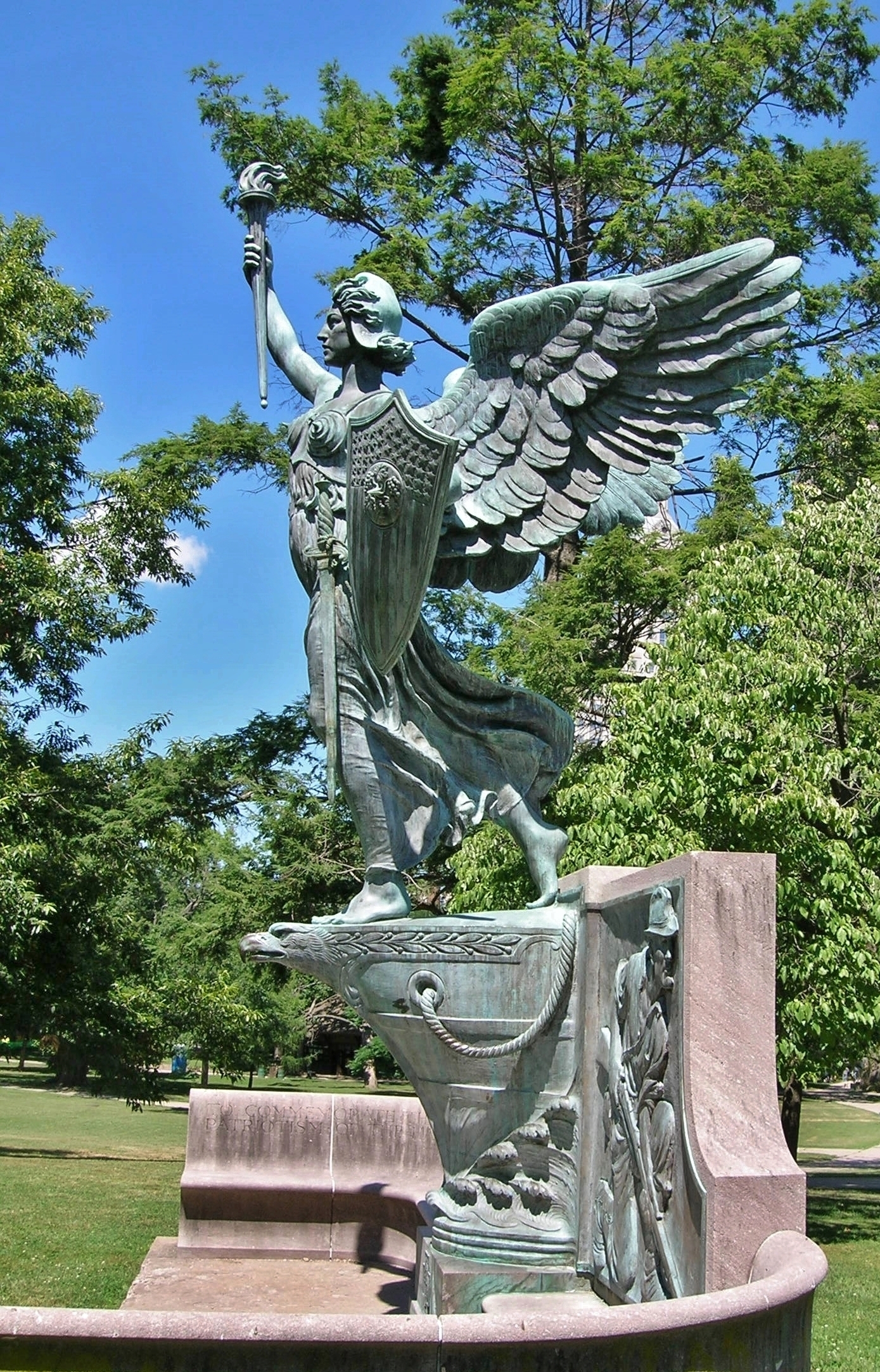
Spirit of Victory (1926), Hartford, CT, showing old patina before refinishing

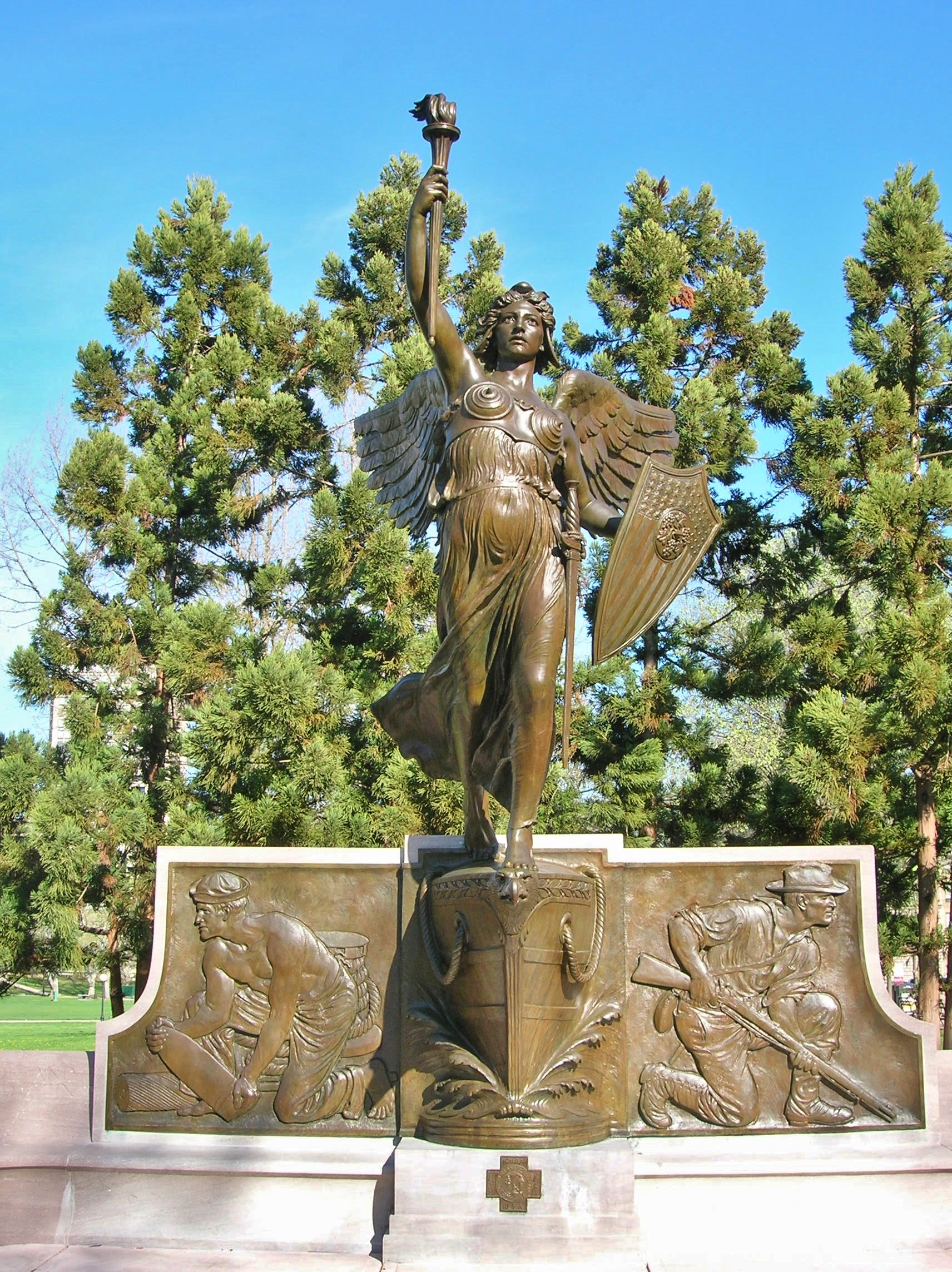
Spirit of Victory (1926), Hartford, Connecticut

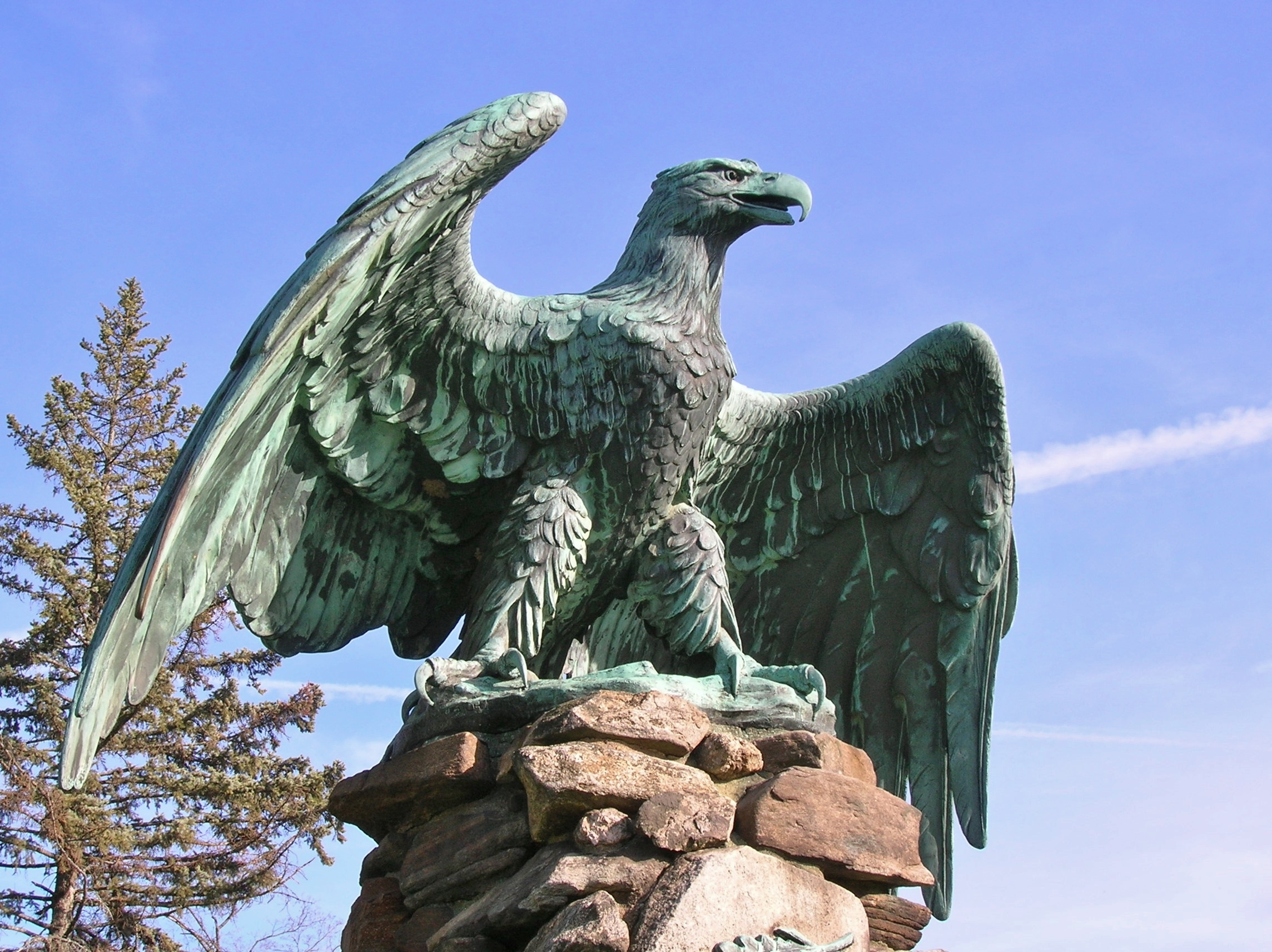
Windsor War Memorial (1928), Windsor, Connecticut

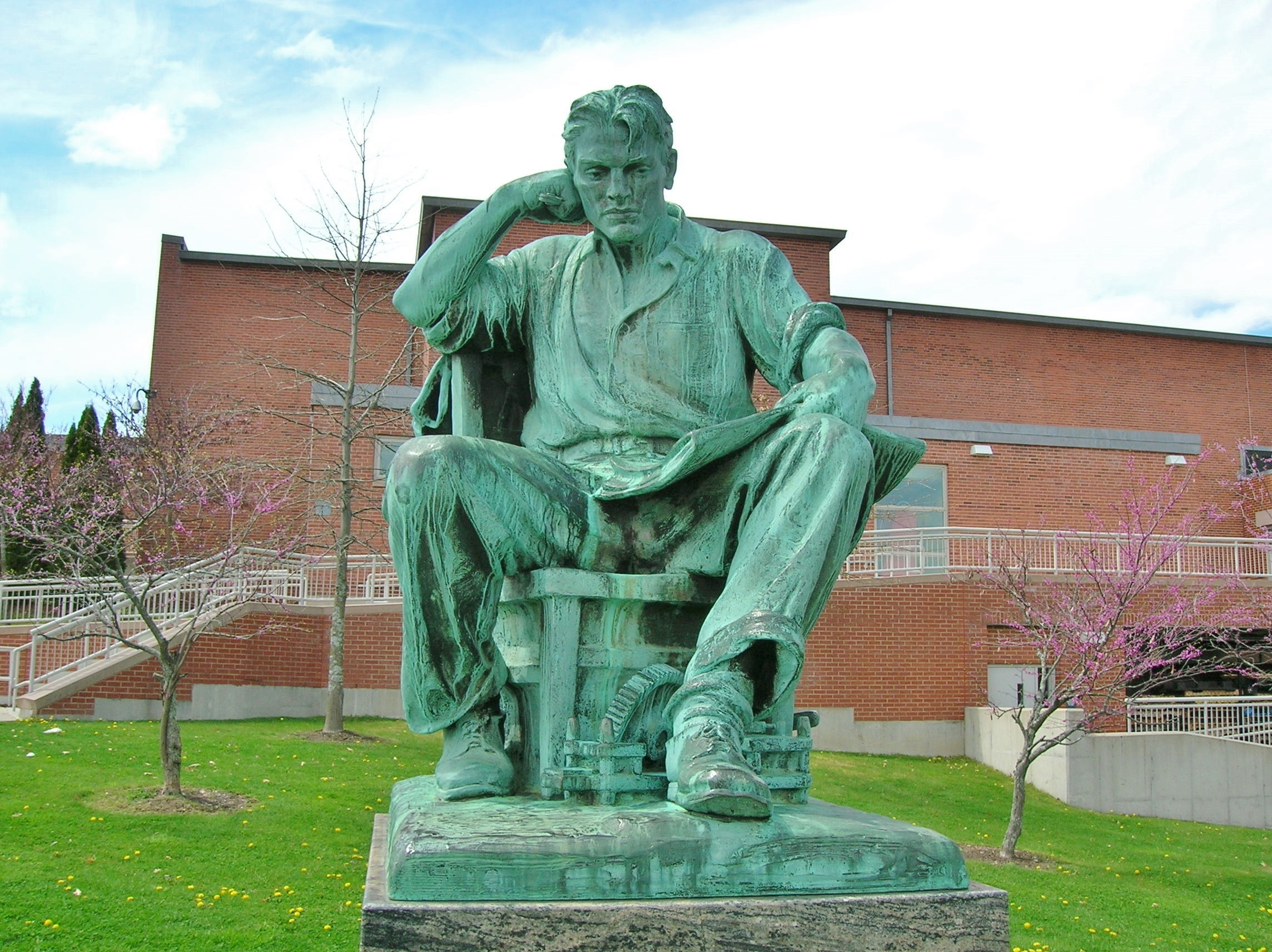
The Craftsman or Industry (1931), Hartford, Connecticut

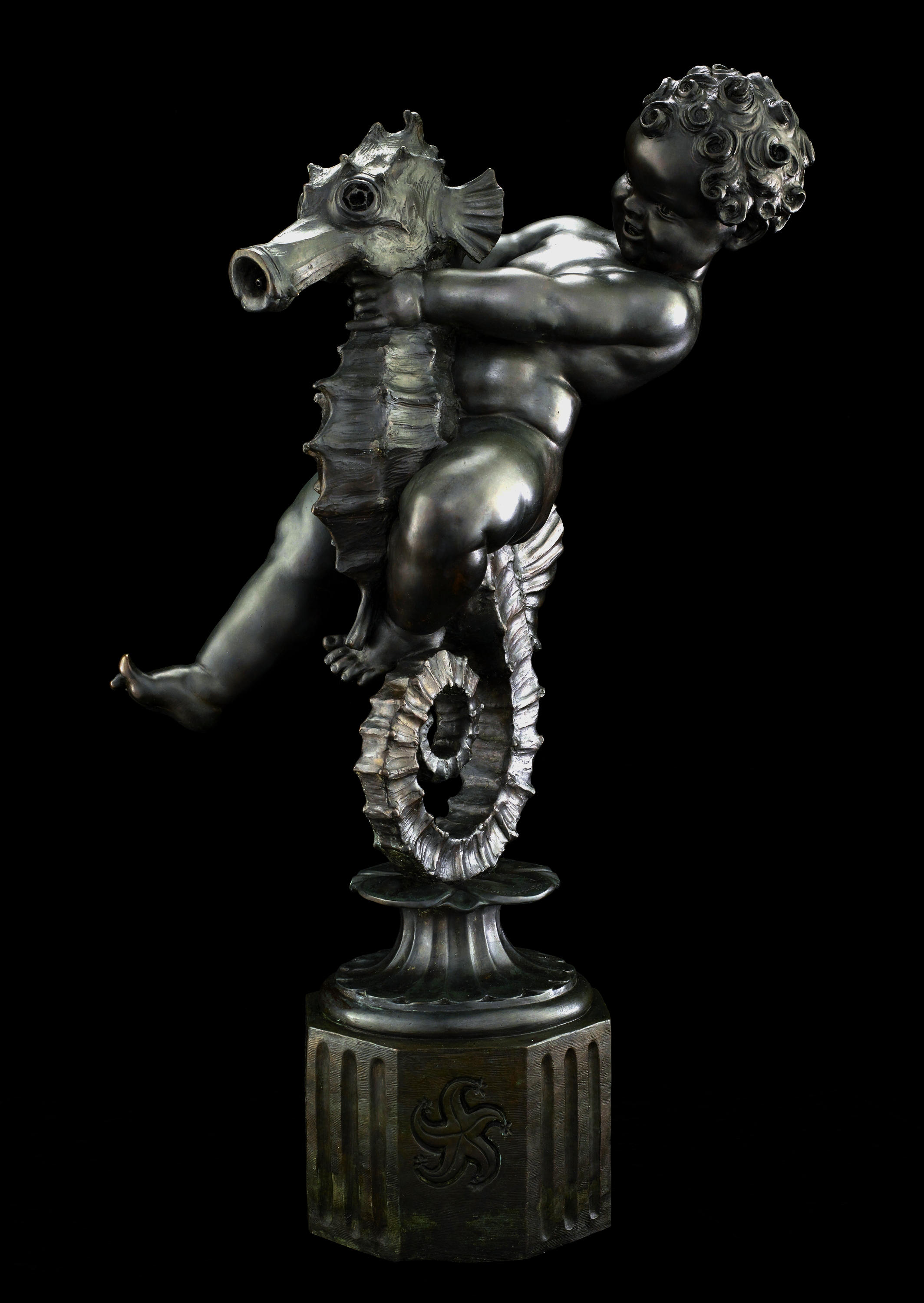
Putto on a Seahorse, 1933, Minneapolis Institute of Art

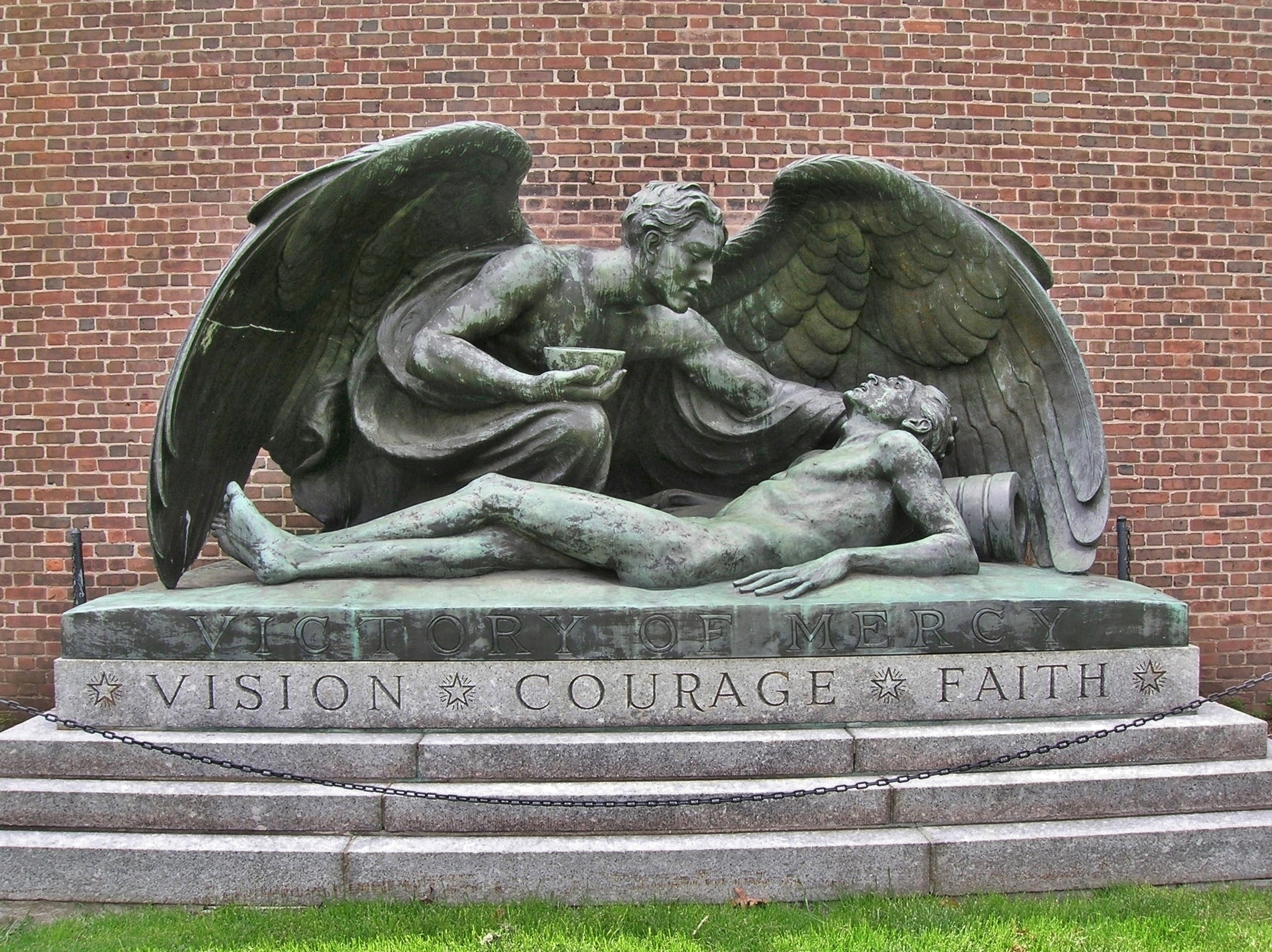
Victory of Mercy (1947), Loomis Chaffee School, Windsor, Connecticut
