= Southwestern Bell =

Southwestern American subsidiary of AT&T

Southwestern Bell Telephone Company, LLC
- Trade name: AT&T Southwest; AT&T Arkansas; AT&T Kansas; AT&T Missouri; AT&T Oklahoma; AT&T Texas
- Formerly: The Missouri and Kansas Telephone Company (1882–1920)
- Type: Subsidiary
- Industry: Telecommunications
- Founded: 1882; 144 years ago
- Headquarters: Whitacre Tower, Dallas, Texas, United States
- Area served: Arkansas, Kansas, Illinois, Missouri, Oklahoma, Texas
- Key people: John Stankey (CEO)
- Products: Local Telephone Service
- Parent: Bell System (1882–1899); AT&T Corporation (1899–1983); AT&T Inc. (1984–present)
- Website: www.att.com

Southwestern Bell Telephone Company, LLC is a wholly owned subsidiary of AT&T. It does business as other d.b.a. names in its operating region, which includes Arkansas, Kansas, Missouri, Oklahoma, Texas, and portions of Illinois. The company is currently headquartered in Dallas, Texas, at One AT&T Plaza.

== History ==
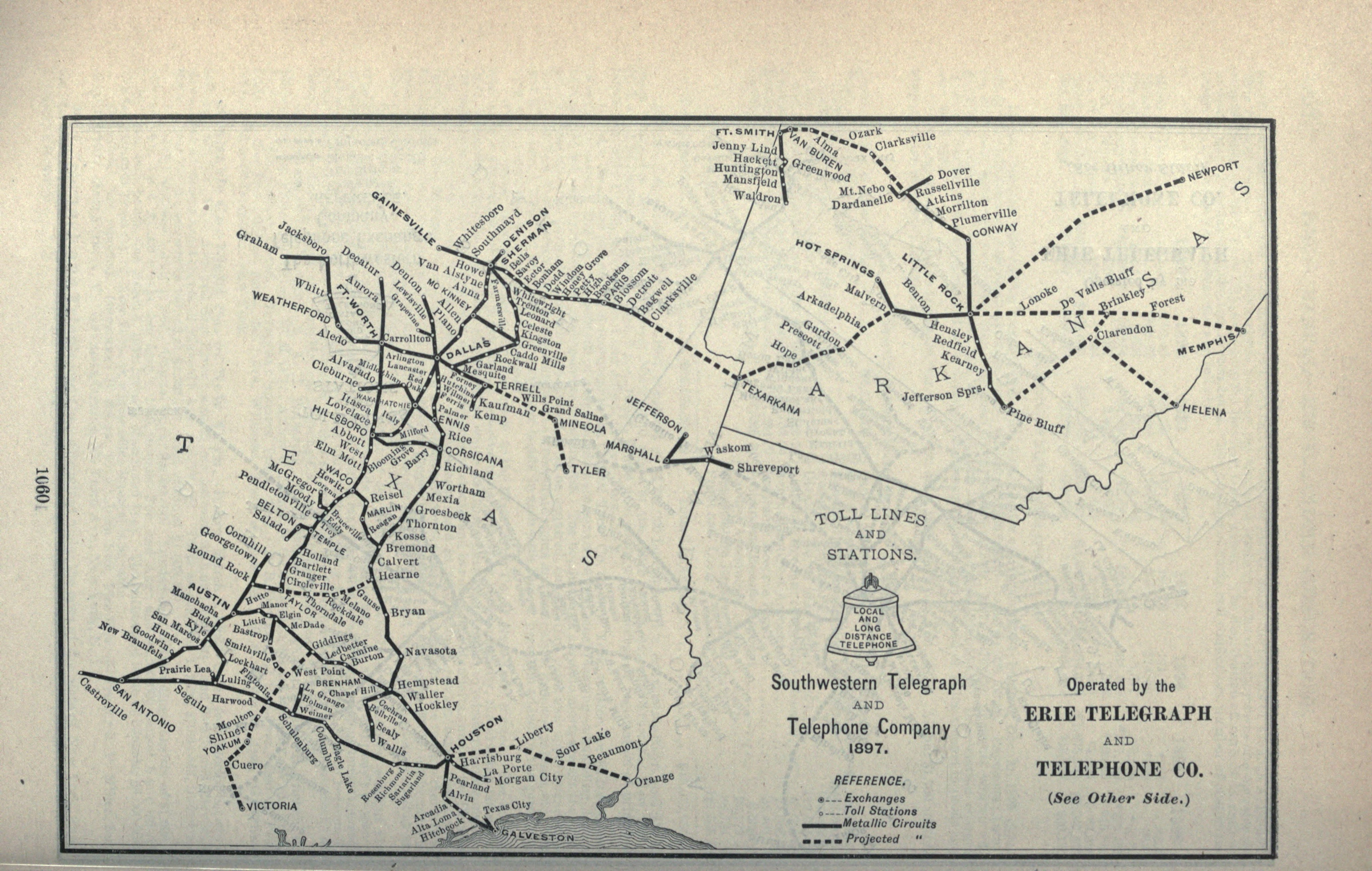
1897 map of service area

Southwestern Bell Telephone Bill, 1984

Southwestern Bell Telephone traces its roots to The Missouri and Kansas Telephone Company, which was founded in 1882. It was consolidated under a single management unit of the Bell System with Southwestern Telegraph and Telephone Company of Texas and Arkansas, Pioneer Telephone and Telegraph Company of Oklahoma, and The Bell Telephone Company of Missouri on March 1, 1912. These companies comprised the "Southwestern System" of the Bell System. The latter three companies were legally merged into Missouri and Kansas Telephone Company in 1917, which was renamed Southwestern Bell Telephone Company.

The company was often considered the first step of the AT&T corporate "ladder" before the 1984 breakup of that company. While part of the Bell System, it was at times the biggest Bell Operating Company of AT&T's 22 local telephone companies.

Southwestern Bell continued to grow in size when it absorbed several smaller telephone companies. In 1950, the company absorbed the operations of Southeast Missouri Telephone Company, which had been formerly named Cape Girardeau Bell Telephone Company. In 1952, the company absorbed the operations of the Southwest Telephone Company, which served Kansas, Missouri, and Oklahoma. In 1953, it absorbed the Ozark Central Telephone Company.

Southwestern Bell also provides service to Kaskaskia and McClure, Illinois.

=== Southwestern Bell Corporation ===
On January 1, 1984, as part of the breakup of AT&T, Southwestern Bell Telephone became the namesake and leading subsidiary of the new Regional Bell Operating Company, Southwestern Bell Corporation. SBC was the smallest of all of the seven "Baby Bells", as it only held one local operating company. The architect of divestiture for Southwestern Bell was Robert G. Pope. He later became the Vice-Chairman of the board of directors and Chief Financial Officer of SBC while remaining the president and CEO of the several subsidiaries including Southwestern Bell Telephone Company.

Although "Southwestern Bell" generally referred to the operations of the entire Baby Bell, in 1995, SBC decided to change its corporate name to SBC Communications in order to reposition itself as a national telecommunications company. Southwestern Bell Telephone underwent a branding overhaul and adopted the slogan, "Your friendly neighborhood global telecommunications company." The slogan was later shortened to, "Friendly. Neighborhood. Global."

==== Reincorporation ====
On December 30, 2001, the original Southwestern Bell Telephone Company, incorporated in Missouri, ceased to exist when it was merged into Southwestern Bell Texas, Inc., a separate operating company incorporated in Texas. Southwestern Bell Texas then converted itself into a limited partnership and renamed itself Southwestern Bell Telephone, L.P., incorporated in Texas. This company ceased to exist on June 29, 2007, when it was merged into SWBT Inc., incorporated in Missouri, which was founded just 8 days prior. At that point, SWBT Inc. took the formerly dormant name Southwestern Bell Telephone Company and Southwestern Bell again became a resident company in Missouri.

In 2012, Southwestern Bell relocated its state of incorporation from Missouri to Delaware.

==== Branding ====
From its name change in 1917 until 2001, SWBT was simply branded as Southwestern Bell. Starting in 1999, SBC Communications began branding its operating companies as part of the "SBC Global Network," with the name enclosed in a circle with the Pacific Telesis "access" mark to the logos of its divisions (Ameritech, Nevada Bell, Pacific Bell, SNET, Southwestern Bell).

In 2000, the Bell logo was dropped from the mark of Southwestern Bell.

In 2001, SBC standardized its operating company branding logos, and placed the SBC corporate logo toward the northwest of the name "Southwestern Bell", and the branding for SWBT became SBC Southwestern Bell.

The Southwestern Bell brand vanished in late 2002 when SBC dropped the names of all its operating companies to use "SBC" as a national brand. Since d.b.a. names were not approved before publishing deadlines for telephone directories distributed in December 2002 and January 2003, the Southwestern Bell Telephone Co. name remained on telephone directories issued in December 2002 and January 2003.

From late 2002 to 2005, Southwestern Bell conducted business under the following names: SBC Arkansas, SBC Kansas, SBC Missouri, SBC Oklahoma, SBC Southwest, and SBC Texas.

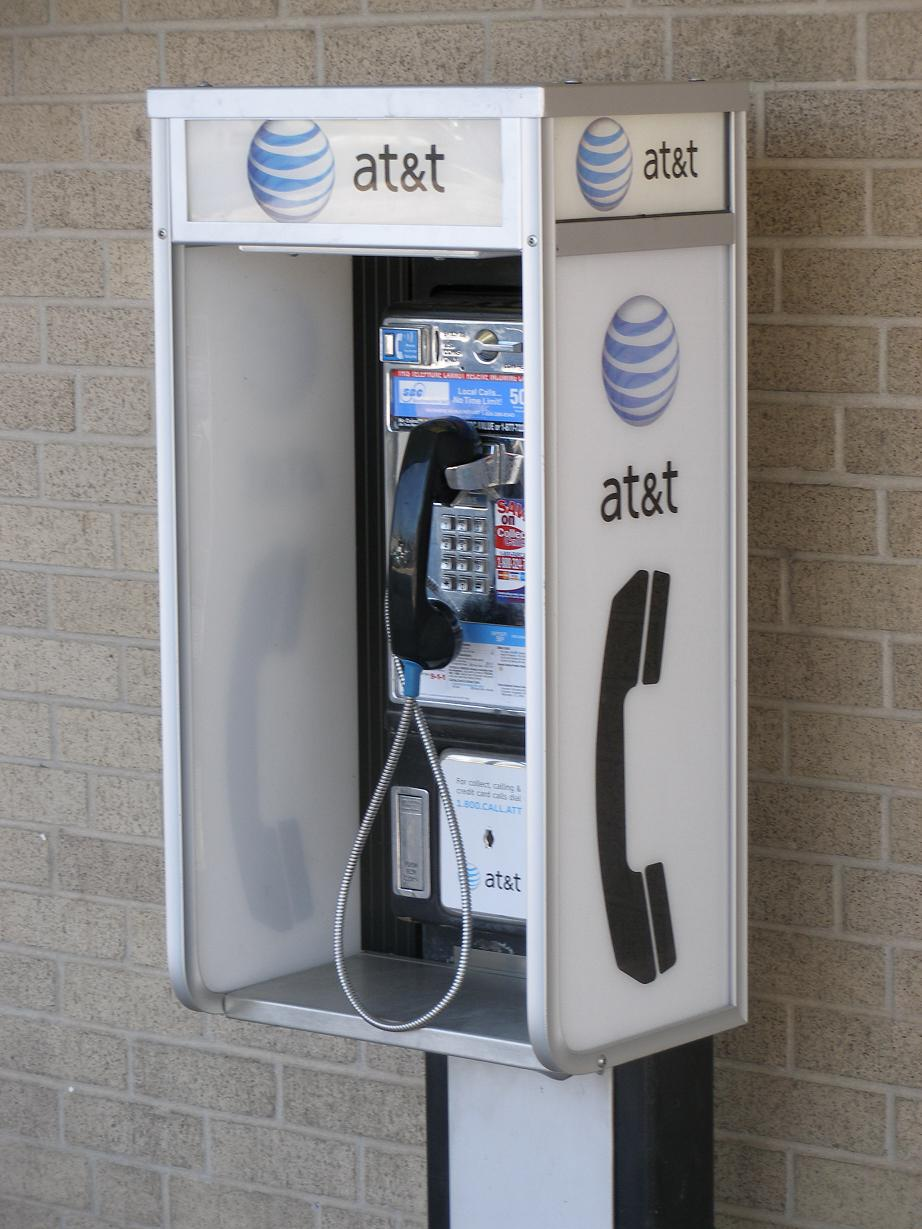
Southwestern Bell payphone with new AT&T signage

SBC Communications bought AT&T Corp. on November 18, 2005, and changed its name to AT&T Inc. Shortly afterwards, on January 15, 2006, AT&T companies were given new d.b.a names. As a result, officially, Southwestern Bell began conducting business under the following names: AT&T Arkansas, AT&T Kansas, AT&T Missouri, AT&T Oklahoma, and AT&T Texas. The regional d.b.a. name is now AT&T Southwest. The legal name remains Southwestern Bell Telephone Company.
