= Whitacre Tower =

AT&T global headquarters and skyscraper in Dallas Texas

Coordinates: 32°46′46″N 96°47′56″W

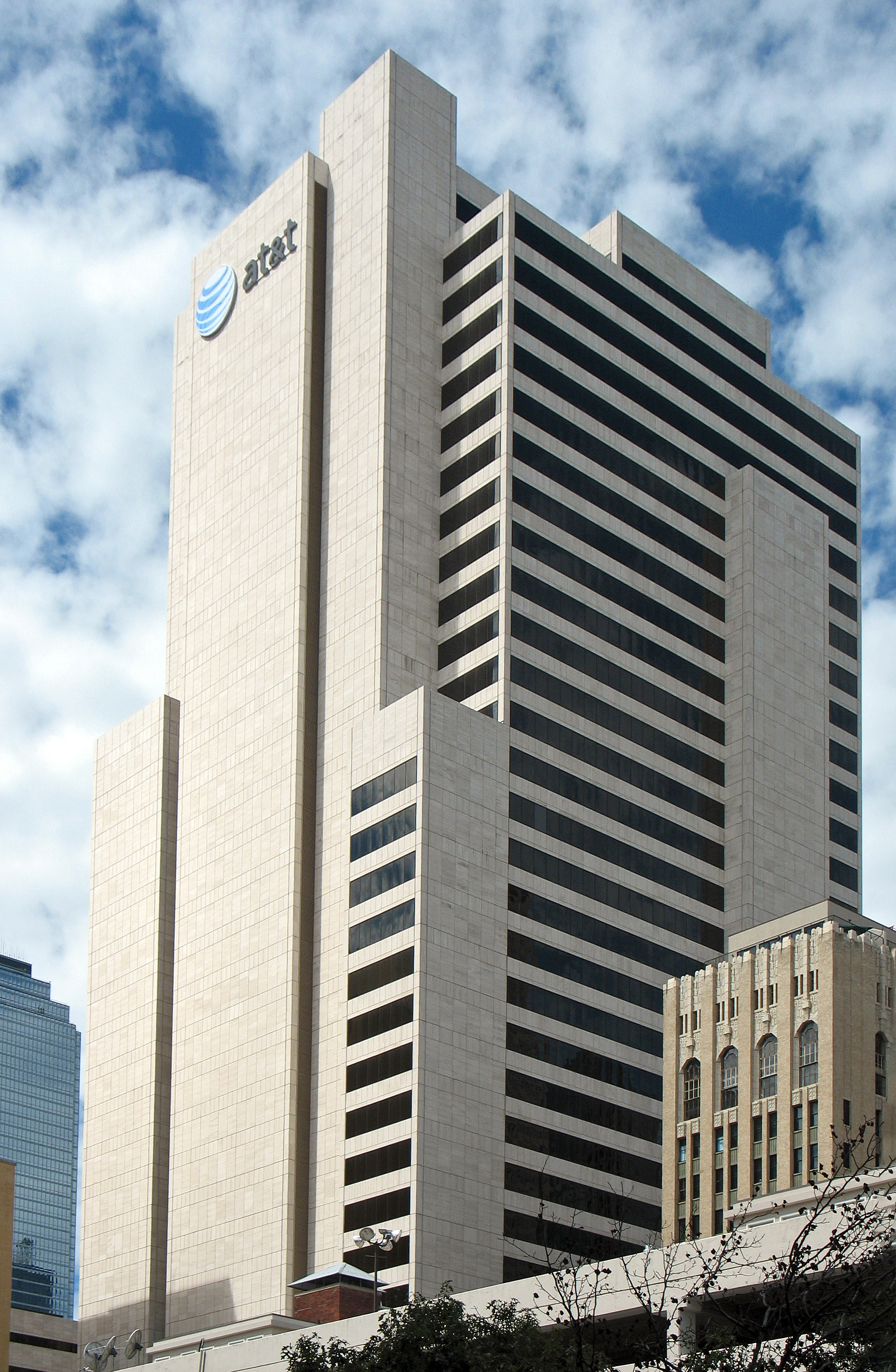
- View of One AT&T Plaza from the southeast
- Interactive map of the Whitacre Tower area

General information
- Type: Office
- Location: 208 South Akard St
- Completed: 1984
- Owner: AT&T (lease); PacElm Properties

Height
- Roof: 580 ft (180 m)

Technical details
- Floor count: 37

Design and construction
- Main contractor: The Beck Group

The Whitacre Tower, also known as One AT&T Plaza, and formerly known as One Bell Plaza, is a 37-story high-rise in Downtown Dallas, built adjacent to the Akard Street Mall in 1984.

The building is the headquarters for AT&T and Southwestern Bell Telephone, which operates as "AT&T Southwest". It is 580 feet (177 m) tall, the 13th-tallest building in the city. The Continental Buff Travertine (provided by Idaho Travertine, now Yellowstone Rock) and glass skyscraper has over 1,000,000 square feet (93,000 m^{2}) of office space.

== History ==
The site of the modern day tower was originally a plot of land purchased by Missouri real estate developer Thomas Field in 1887. In 1893, Field opened the $500,000 Oriental Hotel on the site. In 1924, the Oriental Hotel was torn down and the Baker Hotel was constructed on the same site in 1925. The Baker Hotel was imploded in 1980 to make room for the Southwestern Bell Telephone headquarters, which eventually became the Whitacre Tower in 1982.

AT&T moved its headquarters to the tower from a location in San Antonio, Texas, in 2008. Mayor of Dallas Tom Leppert said then he hoped AT&T would stay in the central city. Most of the around 700 workers moving to the Whitacre Tower were moved into 17 floors that were being refurbished. In August 2008, AT&T sold the tower to Icahn Enterprises and took a long-term lease in the tower.

AT&T renamed the tower the "Whitacre Tower" after Edward Whitacre Jr., a former chairman and chief executive, in 2009. AT&T moved Spirit of Communication, a gold statue, from its Bedminster, New Jersey, offices to the Whitacre Tower.

== See also ==
- List of tallest buildings in Dallas
