= Spirit of Communication =

Sculpture in Dallas, Texas, U.S.

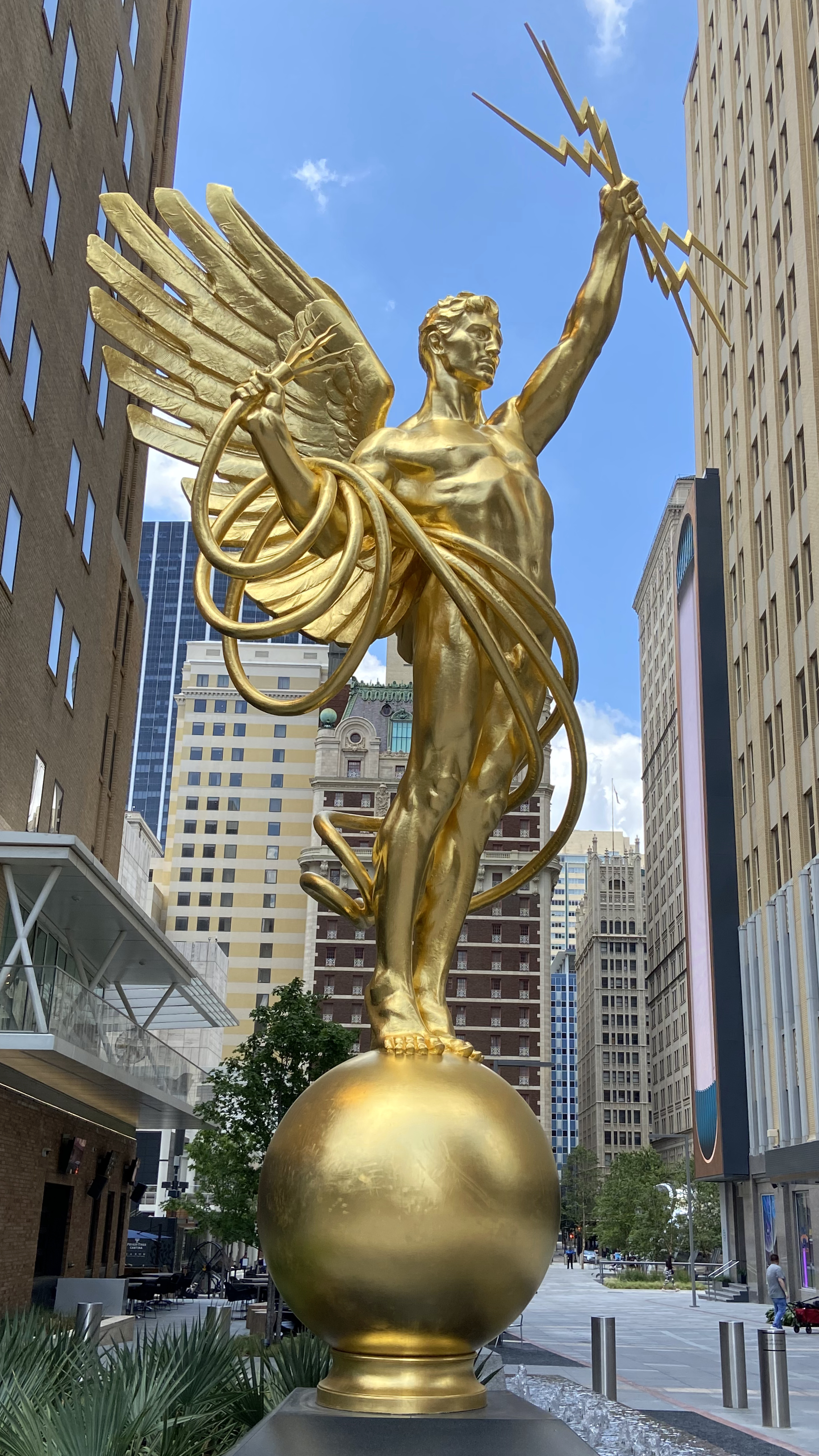
- Artist: Evelyn Beatrice Longman
- Year: 1914
- Type: Bronze
- Location: Dallas, Texas; 32.77854574511915°N 96.79918168099536°W

Spirit of Communication is the formal name for the statue by Evelyn Beatrice Longman originally called Genius of Telegraphy. The statue has been the symbol of AT&T (and also the former Western Electric) since their commission was completed in 1916. It is also known informally as the Golden Boy statue and formerly as Genius of Electricity.

Commissioned for 195 Broadway in New York City, the sculpture has followed AT&T to other sites in New York and New Jersey over the years. In 2009, the statue was relocated to AT&T's current corporate headquarters in downtown Dallas, Texas, U.S. As of 2022, the statue is located outside in the AT&T Discovery District in Downtown Dallas.

== History ==
Commissioned in 1914, it was crafted by Evelyn Beatrice Longman. The work was completed in 1916 and hoisted to the roof of AT&T Corporate Headquarters at 195 Broadway in the Financial District of Lower Manhattan. The statue's design by Evelyn Beatrice Longman was selected as the winner of a competition, similar to the 1917 Bell Telephone Memorial. It became New York City's second-largest sculpture, after the Statue of Liberty. The statue's original name as commissioned under the aegis of AT&T's president Theodore N. Vail was Genius of Telegraphy. By that time, AT&T had spun off its telegraphy component, Western Union, and the work was renamed to Genius of Electricity. In the 1928,1938, and 1941 editions of the training course Principles of Electricity applied to Telephone and Telegraph Work, it was referred to as Spirit of Electricity.

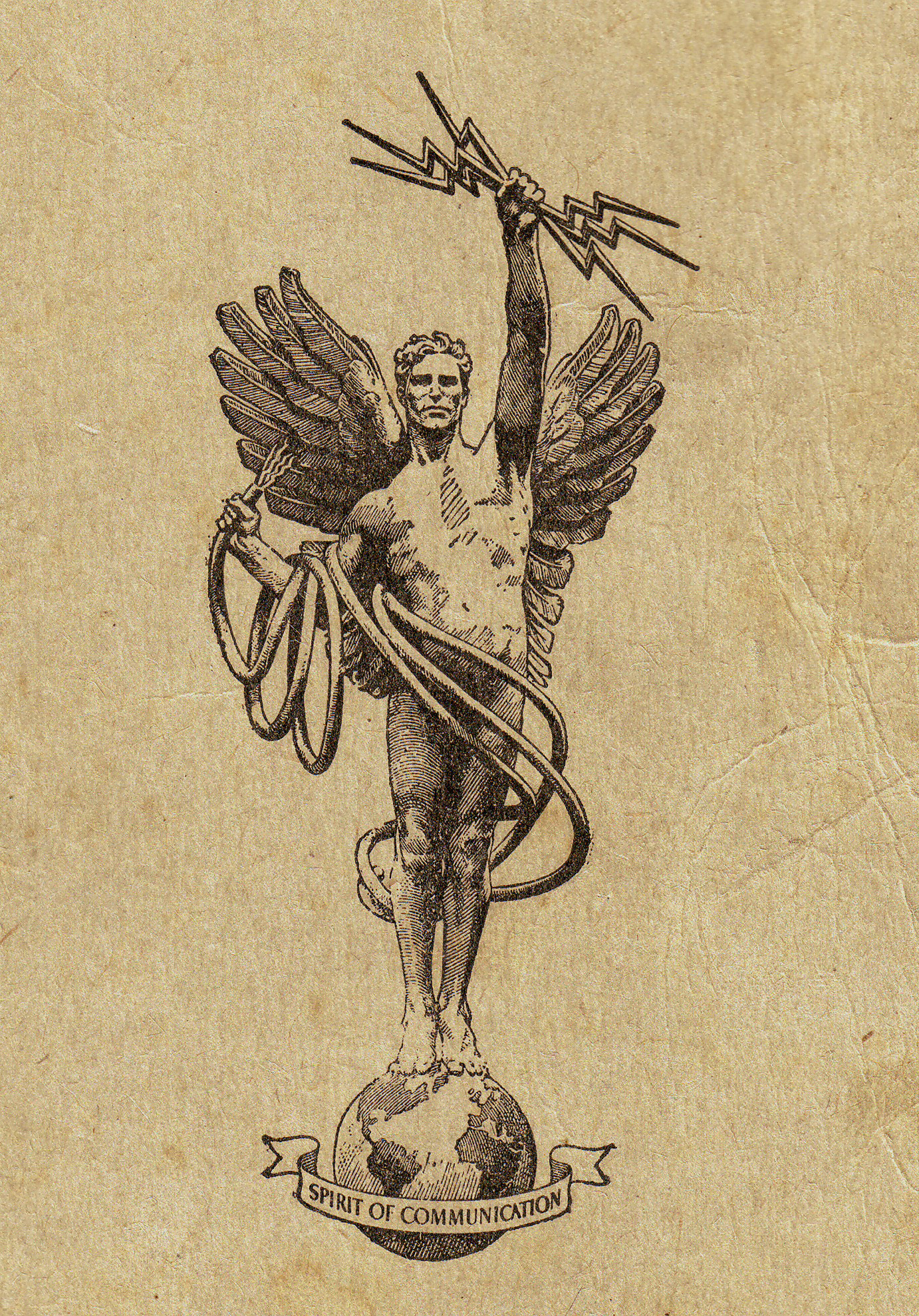
The Spirit of Communication was used by the Bell System on telephone directories.

The statue weighs more than 14.5 tonnes (16 short tons) and is 7.3 metres (24 ft) tall, with wings that extend 2.7 metres (8.9 ft) from its body. It is cast in bronze and covered with more than 12,500 pieces of gold leaf.

Sometime in the mid-1930s, AT&T changed the name of the statue (and the image) to The Spirit of Communication. It continued to stand atop the 195 Broadway building until the early 1980s. In 1984, AT&T moved to a new postmodern headquarters building at 550 Madison Avenue in Midtown Manhattan, designed by Philip Johnson. On Johnson's suggestion, the statue was relocated to the foyer of the new location.

== Relocation to New Jersey ==
1984 marked the end of the Bell System. The New York City headquarters building was sold to Sony in 1992 and the company relocated its headquarters to 32 Avenue of the Americas (which had no room for the statue) and many operating functions across the Hudson River and about forty miles west to a 140-acre (0.57 km^{2}) wooded campus purchased nine years previously in Basking Ridge, New Jersey.

The statue was installed in front of the main entrance to the new building in 1992. In 2002, AT&T sold its Basking Ridge property and moved eight miles (13 km) down the road to Bedminster Township bringing the statue. Those facilities had previously been the headquarters of the AT&T Long Lines division and home to the company's national network operations center.

== Present owners ==
In November 2005, SBC (once a wholly owned subsidiary of the AT&T Corporation—a Baby Bell) acquired AT&T. In a move designed to capitalize on the national and global name of its former parent, San Antonio, Texas–based SBC renamed itself AT&T Inc. In 2009, the new AT&T removed the statue from the Bedminster Township, New Jersey location and later installed it in the lobby of its new headquarters at the Whitacre Tower in Dallas, Texas. The statue was moved yet again in 2019 from the Whitacre Tower to AT&T's Discovery District in Downtown Dallas.

== See also ==
- Bell Telephone Memorial
- IEEE Alexander Graham Bell Medal
