= Mildred Valley Thornton =

Canadian artist (1890–1967)

- Born: Mildred Valley Stinson; May 7, 1890; Dresden, Ontario, Canada
- Died: July 27, 1967 (aged 77); Vancouver, British Columbia, Canada
- Education: Olivet College, Michigan, Ontario School of Art and Art Institute of Chicago
- Known for: Painter
- Movement: Figurative
- Awards: Fellow of Royal Society of Arts

Mildred Valley Thornton FRSA (May 7, 1890 – July 27, 1967) was a Canadian artist most well known for her portraits of First Nations people. She also painted landscapes in oil and watercolour. Her paintings were usually done in vivid colours.

Born in Ontario, she moved to Regina in 1913, and began painting Indigenous portraits fifteen years later. Her portraits were completed quickly, usually under one hour. In 1934, she relocated to British Columbia, and continued to paint individuals of that province's aboriginal population, eventually amassing nearly 300 portraits. Thornton was a tireless lecturer and advocate of Indigenous and women's rights. While lecturing, she often appeared dressed in buckskin, and played Indigenous songs that she had recorded. Besides being an author and art critic, she was involved in numerous literary and artistic associations. She hoped to sell her portrait collection to the Government of Canada, and when this wasn't forthcoming, decreed in her will that it be burned. The portraits narrowly escaped that fate due to a technicality. While popular in her lifetime, Thornton was neglected for some time afterwards. A biography of her by Sheryl Salloum was published in 2011. There has been mixed reactions to her work and persona among First Nations peoples, with some collecting portraits of their ancestors and others regarding Thornton through the lens of cultural appropriation.

== Early life (1890–1913) ==
Mildred Valley Stinson was born a few miles from Rutherford, Ontario, on May 7, 1890. She came from a large farming family. Her early interests included poetry, drawing, and painting. Stinson may have been influenced by her uncle, Edward Longman, an Oxford scholar who was also a painter. Thornton's personality has been described as "fun-loving, driven, and outgoing."

In 1907, she enrolled in Olivet College, Michigan, following in the footsteps of her aunt, Evelyn Beatrice Longman, a noted sculptor. Stinson graduated in 1910. She lived in Toronto for a few years, briefly attending the Ontario School of Art. Two of her instructors were George Agnew Reid and John William Beatty. She employed Beatty's compositional style of a low horizon and muted colours in some of her early paintings. Stinson also had an admiration for the work of Tom Thomson.

== Saskatchewan years (1913–1934) ==
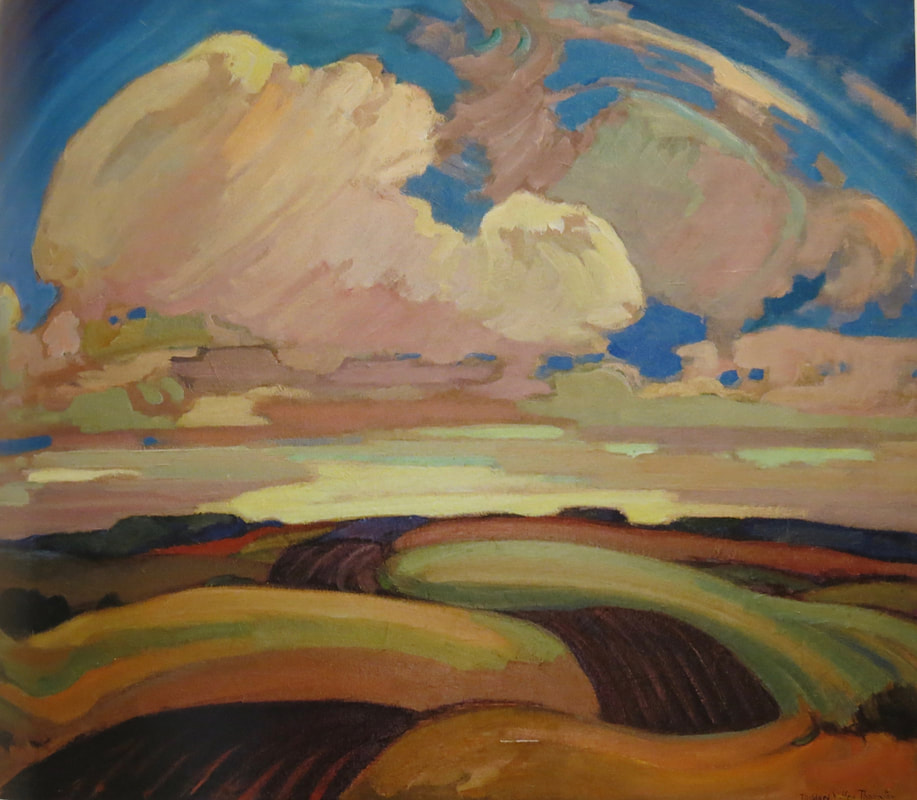
Fireguard, Saskatchewan. Circa 1920.

In 1913, Stinson moved to Regina. While there, a First Nations man standing on a railway station platform made such an impression that she decided upon her future painting subjects. Her fascination with Indigenous peoples had begun earlier, with the Lenape of southern Ontario.

Stinson married John Henry Thornton, a businessman, on April 28, 1915. In 1918–1919, Mildred attended the Art Institute of Chicago. By 1920, Thornton had become an instructor at the Regina College of Art.

Her pastoral landscapes of this period are marked by a colourful palette and aggressive brushstrokes. In 1926, along with other artists she made a pilgrimage to Canoe Lake in Ontario, site of Tom Thomson's death. Later that same year, she had twin sons, John Milton (Jack) and Walter Maitland. Over the ensuing decades, John Thornton's support of his wife's calling was an immense help to Mildred's career, with John often taking on extended caregiving duties during his wife's travels.

Thornton began painting First Nations people in 1928, and always paid them for their time. She had a genuine interest in her subjects, both as individuals and for their culture. Thornton said that her first forays into Indigenous portraiture were often met with suspicion or hostility, but over time she gained easier access. Some of the tribes she visited included the Kainai Nation, Cree, Assiniboine, Blackfoot, Piikani Nation, Tsuutʼina Nation, Sioux, Nakoda, and Saulteaux. In some cases her portraits were the only recorded likeness of a person. Her fascination with native peoples, which grew into a sort of obsession, restrained her artistic career while at the same time spread her fame as an "Indian painter." During her lifetime the Indigenous portraits were never for sale. She also attended native ceremonies, such as the Sun Dance near Gleichen, Alberta. This wider reference to native culture led Thornton to embark on a series of mythological and historical paintings.

Thornton was responsible in 1930 for organizing the representation of Saskatchewan artists at the Canadian National Exhibition in Toronto. The following year, the premier of Saskatchewan, James Anderson, opened an exhibit of Thornton's work. In 1932, she painted the portrait of Arthur Meighen, former Prime Minister of Canada. In the early 1930s, Thornton exhibited at the Canadian National Exhibition, the Ontario Society of Artists, the Royal Canadian Academy of Arts, and the Montreal Museum of Fine Arts.

== British Columbia years (1934–1967) ==
As a result of the Great Depression impacting his restaurant business, John Thornton moved west in 1934 to Vancouver. Mildred and her sons followed, although they left soon after for a stay in Toronto of seven months. Back in Vancouver, John opened a confectionery store. When the family was reunited, Mildred lost no time in organizing an exhibition at the Hudson's Bay store in Vancouver. In 1936, she had a solo exhibition at the Vancouver Art Gallery.

From her Vancouver base, she travelled as far north as Alaska and east to the Kootenays. She painted among the Haida, Tsimshian, Nisga'a, Gitxsan, Kwakwaka'wakw, Dakelh, Sécwepemc, and Coast Salish. She used whatever available means of transportation to reach her destinations, travelling by foot, canoe, horseback, steamboat, automobiles and trains. She painted her subjects wherever they were located, for example, at country fairs or at the Calgary Stampede. Sometimes they were nearby, as when she painted in 1946 five Indigenous men in Kitsilano, including Chiefs Willie Seaweed and Dan Cranmer, who had come to Vancouver for the city jubilee. She often took a slide projector with her to show examples of her work to prospective sitters. One of her most celebrated portraits was of the Haida matriarch Agnes Russ. Thornton recorded the potlatch, secret society rituals, whaling, and handiwork. Like Emily Carr and others, she travelled to remote First Nations communities to paint totem poles, villages and depictions of daily life. She was given at least four honorary names, including "Ah-ou-Mookht", meaning "the one who wears a blanket because she is of noble birth", received from Kwakwaka'wakw Chief Charley Nowell.

Thornton taught at the Commercial and Fine Arts Training Centre in Vancouver during the early 1940s. In 1944, she was instrumental in bringing about an exhibition at the Vancouver Art Gallery entitled British Columbia at Work, on behalf of the Labor Arts Guild. In the same year, she became art critic for the Vancouver Sun, contributing in that role for the next fifteen years. Her columns were sometimes dismissive of avant-garde art.

Thornton was involved in numerous organizations, with affiliations in at least ten cultural groups. In 1948, for example, she was on the executive of the Canadian Women's Press Club, a member of the Canadian Authors Association, and vice-president of the Vancouver Poetry Society. One of the publications she wrote for was The Native Voice. Sometime in the 1940s Thornton befriended the Indigenous carver Ellen Neel. Thornton frequently lectured on First Nations peoples and culture, often drawing large audiences. She had acquired the buckskin dress of Pauline Johnson, and Thornton often wore regalia to her performances.

She toured Eastern Canada in 1954, showing slides of her paintings along with her tape recordings of Indigenous songs. Her husband John Thornton died in 1958, and her son Maitland invited her to London, where she stayed until 1961. She was made a Fellow of the Royal Society of Arts in 1958. In 1960, she gave illustrated lectures to the Royal Commonwealth Society and the Commonwealth League. In the next year, a major exhibition of her work in London was held at the Commonwealth Institute. She published her first book in 1966, Indian Lives and Legends. The book combined her portraits and personal experiences.

Thornton was a fervent collector of Indigenous artifacts, either given to her or bought. Her home in the early 1960s overflowed with carvings, masks, small totem poles, drums, and other objects. Her collection was sold to the provincial government for a low sum when she had to move into an apartment. Thornton's sound recordings were purchased by the British Columbia Archives, which in some cases have proved invaluable after her death.

She had been trying as early as 1946 to find an institutional home for her collection of First Nations portraits, but was rebuffed on all subsequent attempts. In June 1967, she added a codicil in her will that her works should either be sold in one large auction, or taken to the dump, have gasoline poured over them, and set aflame. Fortunately the codicil had not been properly witnessed, thereby preserving the paintings.

Thornton died on July 27, 1967, in Vancouver after suffering from phlebitis for several years.

== Subjects, methods, and style ==
In her portraiture, she favoured depictions of older chiefs, artists, and relatives of important personages, later expanding her focus to anyone who interested her. She occasionally painted children. Working quickly on portraits, Thornton made an initial charcoal sketch. Her sitters were shown in profile, frontal or three-quarters views, usually just presenting the head and shoulders. The poses of her subjects have been described as natural. For artists, she sometimes included background carvings. Her support materials were at times improvised, and paintings exist on plywood, Masonite, cardboard, and even discarded doors. She worked quickly, as she often had under an hour to complete the portrait, so she concentrated on the face, filling in the clothing details later. Art specialist Uno Langmann has noted that Thornton worked with large brushstrokes which has sometimes been criticized. One reviewer in 1989 thought the minimalist features of her portraits gave them a contemporary look.

Wherever she went, she made watercolour sketches of the landscape which rarely incorporated figures. Sometimes these quick creations were later worked in oils. In her watercolours, Thornton preferred purples, pinks, greens, and blues. Thornton painted totems in an impressionist style. She was a friend of the photographer John Vanderpant, and she painted grain elevators in Vancouver inspired by his images. Her finished oils and watercolours were in the manner of the Group of Seven, with broad swathes of colour. Her style, according to Anthony Westbridge, has affinities with the Beaver Hall Group and the Emma Lake School.

The first impression frequently noted of her paintings is one of vivid colour, which often came almost straight from the tube. Sometimes her bright colours alienated even sympathetic viewers. Apart from the hues, Thornton's paintings are more representational than Emily Carr, with whom she is often compared.

== Legacy and reception ==
Thornton's output of First Nations portraits, arts, and lifestyles neared 400 pieces at the time of her death, but the collection was gradually dispersed afterwards. Followers of Thornton in regards to Indigenous representation include Patricia Richardson Logie and James Archibald Houston.

Many band councils have collected portraits of their ancestors. Working with the West Vancouver Museum and Archives, the Squamish people exhibited fourteen of Thornton's portraits in the 1999 show, Kw'achmixwáylh: Showing of the Pictures. That same year saw Thornton inducted as an Honorary Member of the Canadian Portrait Academy, classifying her as one of Canada's portrait artists of the twentieth century. In 2003, the book Buffalo People: Portraits of a Vanishing Nation was published. In 2011, a comprehensive account of the life and work of Mildred Valley Thornton by Sheryl Salloum was published through Mother Tongue Publishing.

Thornton was nationally acclaimed in her lifetime, especially during the 1940s. Gordon A. Smith thought her work was very good. According to Gunter Heinrich, she had the ability to capture the essence of a person. However, in the 1950s younger artists who favoured abstraction began to see her art and views as outdated. The Vancouver Art Gallery only owns one painting by Thornton, a portrait of Willie Seaweed.

Questions of whether Thornton exploited First Nations people and culture have been raised. Thornton has been charged with telling stories she wasn't privileged to tell, and framing issues differently than her subjects may have done. However, Thornton strived for mutual exchange and collaboration. A 1985 show of Thornton's paintings at the Butler Galleries in Vancouver was described as "more historic than artistic interest," although some of the portraits were considered to have merit. A 2000 book review of Buffalo People: Portraits of a Vanishing Nation, noted that Thornton didn't insist on her subjects wearing traditional clothing, and that she had a genuine interest in the cultures she was chronicling. However, the reviewer found her tone detached and condescending, reminiscent of the poems of Duncan Campbell Scott, with their common focus on a dying way of life.

== Selected solo exhibitions ==
- Hotel Saskatchewan – Regina, 1930
- Hazen-Twiss store – Regina, 1933
- Little Gallery – Seattle, 1940
- Hudson's Bay Company – Vancouver, 1941, 1958
- Eaton's Fine Art Galleries – Toronto, 1941
- Provincial Museum – Victoria, 1942
- Vancouver Art Gallery – 1936, 1942, 1949
- Commonwealth Institute – London, 1959, 1961
- Gallery of British Columbia Arts – Vancouver, 1980
- Butler Galleries – Vancouver, 1985
- Assiniboia Gallery – Saskatoon, 1989

== Selected group exhibitions ==
- Canadian National Exhibition – 1931, 1932
- Royal Canadian Academy of Arts – 1932, 1934, 1941
- Ontario Society of Artists – 1933
- Art Association of Montreal – 1933
- Vancouver Art Gallery – 1958, 2003, 2006, 2008
- Norman MacKenzie Art Gallery – Regina, 1971
- Simon Fraser University Gallery – 1974

== Collections ==
- National Gallery of Canada
- McMichael Canadian Art Collection
- Glenbow Museum
- Vancouver Art Gallery
- British Columbia Parliament Buildings

== Sources ==
- Ashwell, Reg (May–June 1979). "Mildred Valley Thornton". Arts West. 4 (3): 29–31.
- MacDonald, Colin S. (2008). Newlands, Anne (ed.). Dictionary of Canadian Artists. Vol. 8. Unpublished. Compiled by Anne Newlands from the research by Colin MacDonald and the artist file that is located at the National Gallery Library. Electronic copy available from the National Gallery Library and Archives.
- McMann, Evelyn de R. (1981). Royal Canadian Academy of Arts/Académie royale des arts du Canada: Exhibitions and Members 1880–1979. Toronto: University of Toronto Press. p. 402. ISBN 0-8020-2366-5.
- McMann, Evelyn de R. (1988). Montreal Museum of Fine Arts, formerly Art Association of Montreal: Spring Exhibitions 1880–1970. Toronto: University of Toronto Press. p. 375. ISBN 0-8020-2650-8.
- Mildred Valley Thornton, FRSA (1890–1967): An Exhibition of Painting & Watercolours November 16th to December 8th, 1985. Vancouver: Butler Galleries. 1985. pp. 6–10.
- Newman, Marketa, ed. (1990). Biographical Dictionary of Saskatchewan Artists: Women Artists. Vol. 2. Saskatoon: Fifth House Publishers. pp. 252–254. ISBN 0-920079-66-0.
- Salloum, Sheryl (2011). The Life and Art of Mildred Valley Thornton. Saltspring Island, B.C.: Mother Tongue Publishing Limited. ISBN 978-1-896949-05-5.
- Tippett, Maria (1974). Contemporaries of Emily Carr in British Columbia. Burnaby, B.C.: Simon Fraser University. p. 14.
- Watson, Scott (1983). "Art in the Fifties: Design, Leisure, and Painting in the Age of Anxiety". Vancouver: Art and Artists 1931–1983. Vancouver: Vancouver Art Gallery. pp. 73–74. ISBN 0-920095-00-3.
- Westbridge, Anthony R.; Bodnar, Diana L., eds. (2003). The Collector's Dictionary of Canadian Artists at Auction. Vol. 4. Vancouver: Westbridge Publications Ltd. pp. 63–64. ISBN 0-9685907-3-X.

== Works by Mildred Valley Thornton ==
- Thornton, Mildred Valley (1966). Indian Lives and Legends. Vancouver: Mitchell Press Limited.
- Thornton, Mildred Valley (2000). Buffalo People: Portraits of a Vanishing Nation. Surrey, B.C.; Blaine, WA: Hancock House Publishers. ISBN 0-88839-479-9.
- Thornton, Mildred Valley (2003). Potlatch People: Indian Lives & Legends of British Columbia. Surrey, B.C.; Blaine, WA: Hancock House Publishers. ISBN 0-88839-491-8.
