= Thomas A. Watson =

American inventor and assistant to Alexander Graham Bell

- Watson, c. 1883
- Born: Thomas Augustus Watson; January 18, 1854; Salem, Massachusetts, US
- Died: December 13, 1934 (aged 80); Pass-a-Grille, Florida, US
- Resting place: Old North Cemetery, Weymouth, Massachusetts
- Spouse: Elizabeth Watson (1882-1934; his death)
- Children: 3

Thomas Augustus Watson (January 18, 1854 – December 13, 1934) was an American inventor and assistant to Alexander Graham Bell in the invention of the telephone in 1876. Afterwards, he founded the Fore River Ship and Engine Building Company, which became a major shipyard during World War II.

== Life and work ==
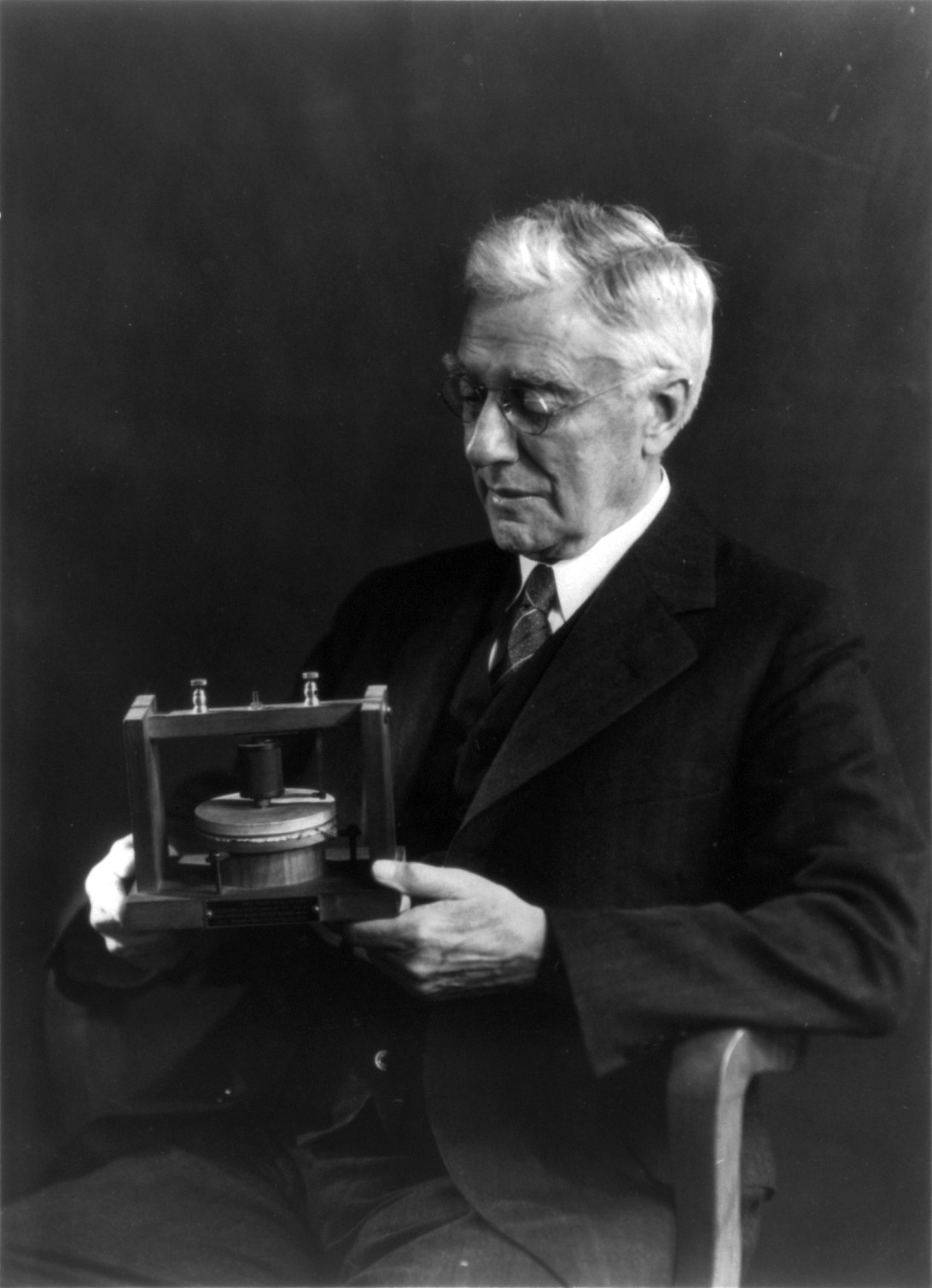
Watson in his later years, holding Bell's original telephone

Born in Salem, Massachusetts, United States, Watson was a bookkeeper and a carpenter before he found a job more to his liking in the Charles Williams machine shop in Boston in 1872. He was then hired by Alexander Graham Bell, who was then a professor at Boston University.

Watson had the distinction of receiving the first telephone call (from Bell in the next room) and hearing his name as the first ever spoken over the phone. According to Bell's notebook, "Mr. Watson – Come here – I want to see you" were the words spoken by Bell. The precise phrasing is uncertain, since Watson himself remembered it as "Mr. Watson – Come here – I want you" in a film made for Bell Labs in 1931.

After the invention of the telephone, Watson developed many accessories for it, including the ringer, which would alert someone not standing by the telephone that a call was being placed. The first version involved a hammer which hit a diaphragm; this was followed by a version employing a buzzer. After more experimentation, he invented the polarized ringer, in which a small hammer positioned between two bells is electromagnetically drawn back and forth to strike them in rapid alternation; this device was manufactured for 60 years.

Watson resigned from the Bell Telephone Company in 1881 at the age of 27. Using money from his royalties from his participation in the invention of the telephone, Watson first tried his hand at farming. He tried geology as well and was even nominated for Massachusetts State Treasurer. In 1883 Watson founded the Fore River Ship and Engine Building Company. He soon began taking bids for building naval destroyers and by 1901 the Fore River Ship and Engine Company was one of the largest shipyards in America. The company grew to employ four thousand workmen and was able to build six warships for the US Navy. It would later become one of the major shipyards during World War II, after being purchased by Bethlehem Steel Corporation. When Watson sold his share in the shipyard, he decided to "turn boy again" and became an actor.

On January 25, 1915, Watson was at 333 Grant Avenue in San Francisco to receive the first transcontinental telephone call, placed by Bell from the Telephone Building at 15 Dey Street in New York City. President Woodrow Wilson and the mayors of both cities were also involved in the call.

Late in his life, at the age of 77, upon being impressed with a meeting with Indian spiritual leader Meher Baba in England, Watson was instrumental in helping to arrange for Meher Baba to come to the United States for his first visit there in 1931. Upon meeting Baba, Watson is reported to have said, "In my seventy-eight years of life, today is the first time I have experienced what divine love is. I have come to realize this with just a touch from Meher Baba". Later, though, Watson became disenchanted with Baba.

Watson wrote an autobiography in 1926 titled Exploring Life: The Autobiography of Thomas A. Watson. He was portrayed by Henry Fonda in the film The Story of Alexander Graham Bell, which was released in 1939.

Watson died of heart disease on December 13, 1934, at his winter home in Pass-a-Grille, Florida. He is buried in the North Weymouth, Massachusetts cemetery. His family gravesite sits by the cemetery road, with a vantage point that looks directly at the former shipyard.

Thomas Watson was married to Elizabeth Watson. After he died in 1934, she continued to live in Pass-a-Grille during World War II and died in the hospital in St. Petersburg, Florida in 1949.
