= M Social Hotel New York Downtown =

Hotel in Manhattan, New York

- M Social Hotel New York Downtown in Lower Manhattan

General information
- Status: Completed
- Type: Hotel
- Location: 55 Church Street, New York City, New York, U.S.
- Coordinates: 40°42′40″N 74°0′37″W
- Construction started: 1990
- Completed: 1992
- Opened: June 10, 1992
- Cost: $200million (resold for $75m in 1995)
- Owner: City Developments Limited
- Operator: Millennium & Copthorne Hotels

Height
- Roof: 179.23 m (588 ft)
- Top floor: 168.6 m (553 ft)

Technical details
- Floor count: 56
- Lifts/elevators: 10

Design and construction
- Architect: Eli Attia
- Developer: Peter Kalikow

The M Social Hotel New York Downtown, formerly the Millennium Downtown New York, is a hotel in Lower Manhattan, New York City, located at the southeast corner of Fulton Street and Church Street. The hotel is adjacent to 195 Broadway, with which it shares the block, and is located across Church Street from the World Trade Center. The building is 55 stories tall, with a total of 569 guest rooms and 98 suites.

== History ==
=== 20th century ===
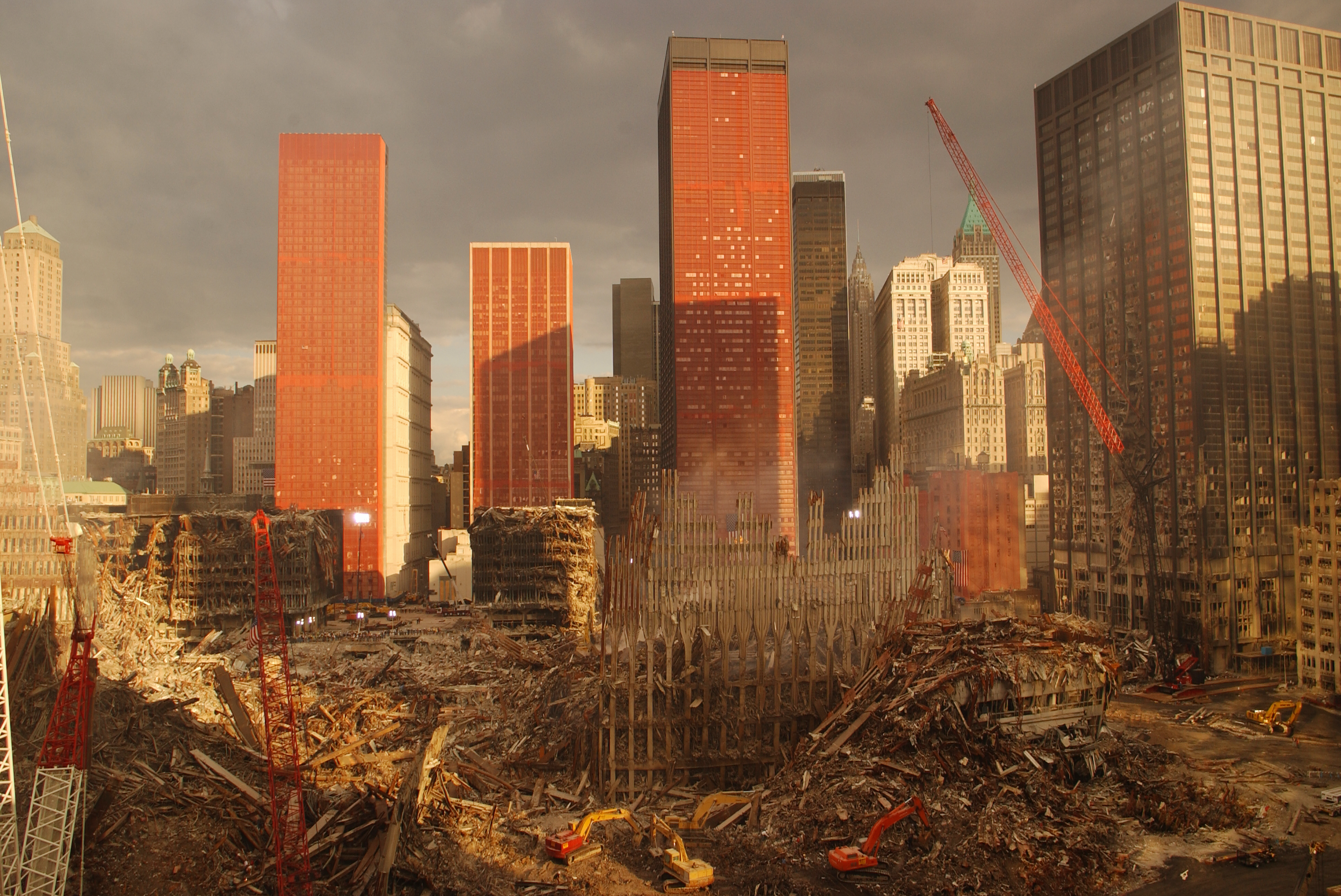
The Millenium Hilton (on the left of the orange mesh covered buildings), 17 days after the September 11 attacks on the World Trade Center

In 1984, AT&T moved out of its adjacent headquarters at 195 Broadway. The block bounded by Fulton, Church, and Dey Streets and Broadway, including 195 Broadway, was sold for $70 million to Peter Kalikow. Kalikow demolished two smaller structures near the block's western boundary. He considered two plans—those for an office building and for a hotel—switching between the plans before finally deciding upon a hotel. Kalikow built The Millenium Hotel at a cost of $200 million and it opened on June 10, 1992. Kalikow chose to intentionally misspell the name with one "n" as "Millenium" on the outdoor signage and official literature, even though the correct spelling of the English word is "millennium", in order to make the name more distinctive.

Soon after the hotel opened, Kalikow went into bankruptcy and was forced to sell it. Kalikow Fulton Church Realty sold the Millenium Hotel to Singapore-based City Developments Limited (CDL) in June 1994, for $75 million. At that time, Hilton began managing the property as The Millenium Hilton.

=== 21st century ===
The Millenium Hilton suffered extensive damage from the September 11 attacks. Amateur video recorded by a guest (Guy Rosbrook) at the 35th floor of the hotel on that day shows the proximity of the destruction, as well as initial directives from staff to shelter in place before the building was evacuated. The hotel was closed for over 18 months, while it was completely refurbished. It reopened for business on May 5, 2003. The U.S. flag which hung outside the hotel on 9/11 was recovered by hotel workers and is now on display in the lobby.

The hotel was renamed the Millennium Hilton New York Downtown in 2017, using the more conventional spelling. It was, for many years, one of four hotels owned by CDL subsidiary Millennium & Copthorne Hotels, that were not marketed as part of their Millennium Hotels chain. Instead, they were managed by Hilton Hotels Corporation. The others were the Millennium Hilton New York One UN Plaza, Millennium Hilton Seoul and Millennium Hilton Bangkok. The hotel ceased to be managed by Hilton on January 18, 2022 and was renamed Millennium Downtown New York. In October 2025, it was renamed the M Social Hotel New York Downtown, following an extensive renovation of the 569 guest rooms.
