= 195 Broadway =

Office skyscraper in Manhattan, New York

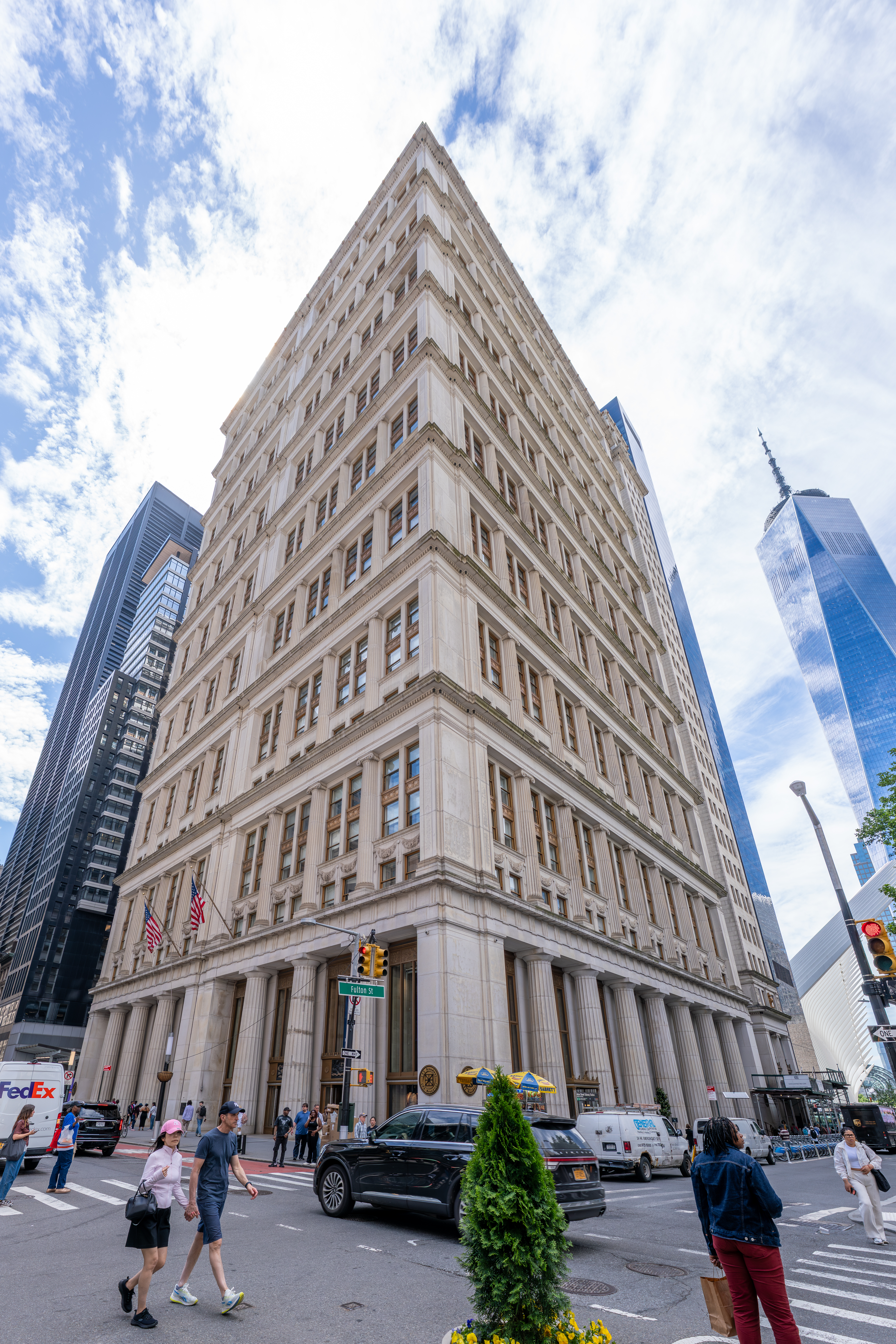
- Seen from Fulton Street and Broadway
- Interactive map of the 195 Broadway area
- Alternative names: American Telephone & Telegraph Company Building, Western Union Building

General information
- Type: Commercial
- Architectural style: Neoclassical
- Location: 195–207 Broadway, Financial District, Manhattan, New York City, New York, United States
- Coordinates: 40°42′39″N 74°00′34″W
- Construction started: 1912
- Completed: 1922
- Opening: 1916
- Owner: L&L Holding Company

Height
- Tip: 422 ft (129 m)
- Roof: 398 ft (121 m)

Technical details
- Floor count: 29
- Lifts/elevators: 30

Design and construction
- Architect: William Welles Bosworth

New York City Landmark
- Designated: July 25, 2006
- Reference no.: 2194
- Designated entity: Exterior

New York City Landmark
- Designated: July 25, 2006
- Reference no.: 2199
- Designated entity: First-story interior

195 Broadway, also known as the Telephone Building, Telegraph Building, or Western Union Building, is an early skyscraper on Broadway in the Financial District of Manhattan in New York City. The building was the longtime headquarters of AT&T Corp. and Western Union. It occupies the entire western side of Broadway from Dey to Fulton Streets.

The site of the building formerly was occupied by the Western Union Telegraph Building. The current 29-story, 422-foot-tall (129 m) building was commissioned after AT&T's 1909 acquisition of Western Union. It was constructed from 1912 to 1916 under the leadership of Theodore Newton Vail, to designs by William W. Bosworth, although one section was not completed until 1922. It was the site of one end of the first transcontinental telephone call, the first intercity Picturephone call, and the first transatlantic telephone call. Though AT&T's headquarters relocated to 550 Madison Avenue in 1984, 195 Broadway remains in use as an office building as of 2024.

Bosworth's design was heavily Greek-influenced: though the facade is made of white Vermont granite, it features layers of gray granite columns in Doric and Ionic styles, as well as various Greek-inspired ornamentation. The northwestern corner of the building was designed similar to a campanile with a stepped roof, which formerly supported the Spirit of Communication statue. The Greek design carried into the large lobby, clad with marble walls and floors, and containing sculptural ornament by Paul Manship and Gaston Lachaise. The exterior and first-floor interior spaces were designated as city landmarks by the New York City Landmarks Preservation Commission in 2006.

== Site ==
195 Broadway is on the west side of Broadway, between Fulton Street to the north and Dey Street to the south, in the Financial District of Lower Manhattan in New York City. The building has a frontage of 275 feet (84 m) on Dey Street, 154 feet (47 m) on Broadway, and 200 feet (61 m) on Fulton Street. According to the New York City Department of City Planning, the lot has an area of 36,775 square feet (3,416.5 m^{2}). 195 Broadway shares a block with the Millennium Hilton New York Downtown hotel to the west. Other nearby buildings include St. Paul's Chapel to the north, the Fulton Center and Corbin Building to the east, and the World Trade Center Transportation Hub and 3 World Trade Center to the west.

== Architecture ==
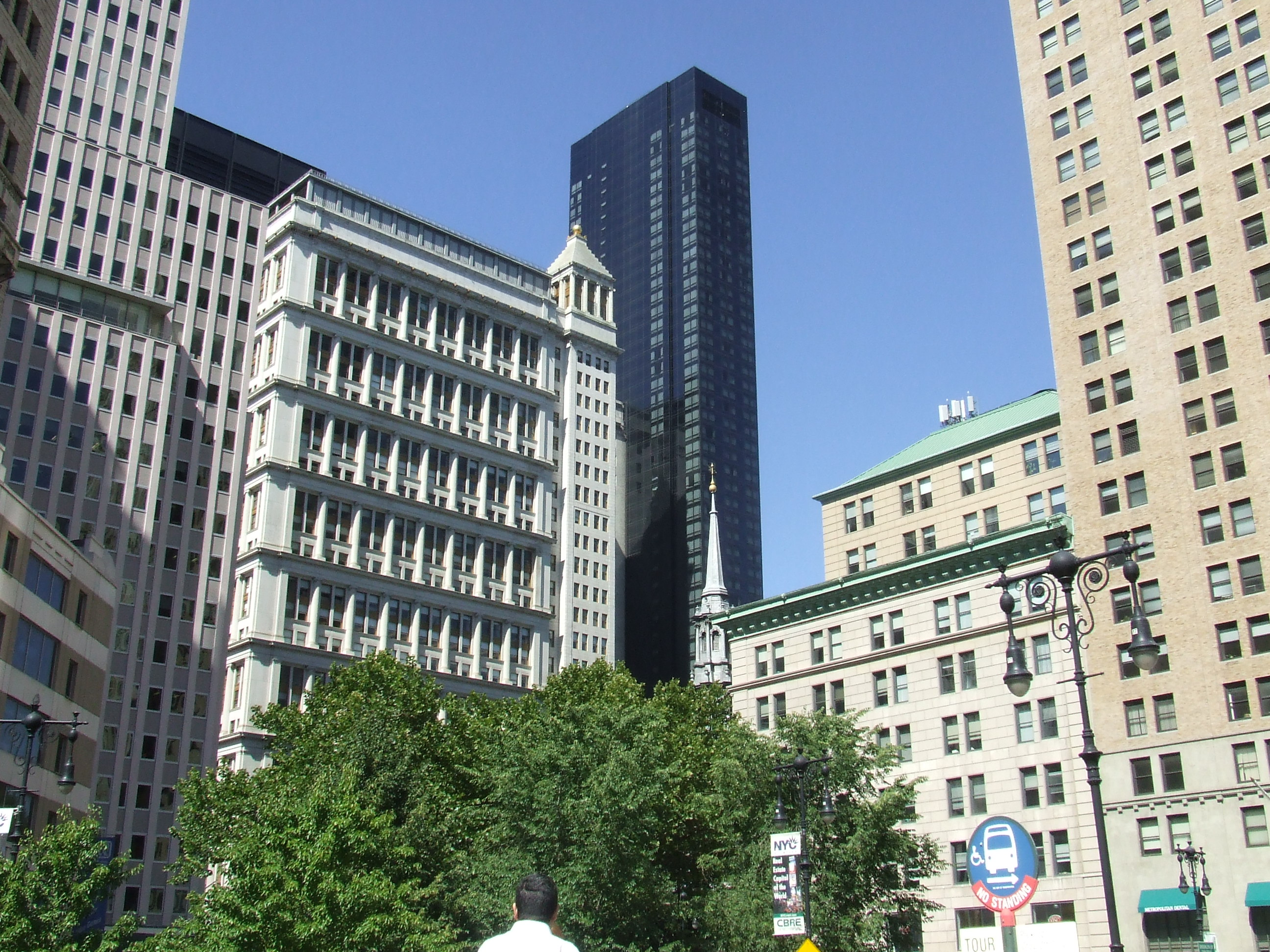
195 Broadway (left center) seen from Park Row

Though William Welles Bosworth is credited as the architect, the design of 195 Broadway was largely influenced by AT&T Corp. head Theodore Newton Vail. According to Bosworth, "It was the aim of Mr. Vail that [195 Broadway] should express the ideal the Telephone Company stands for." For the lobby, Bosworth was inspired by the design of the Parthenon's porticos and Egyptian hypostyles to create "a forest of polished marble" supported by massive columns.

Bosworth's design was heavily Greek-influenced; it featured layers of gray granite columns in Doric and Ionic styles, and a lobby that included 43 oversized Doric columns made of marble. Many building details, such as the columns and the metal grilles above each entrance bay, were nearly identical copies of similar features on classical Greek buildings such as the Parthenon and the Temple of Artemis. Bosworth also incorporated several "architectural refinements" that Brooklyn Museum professor William H. Goodyear had noted as being characteristic of Greek architecture, including column spacing and progressively smaller columns at higher floors. Ornament was yet another important part of the design and was ubiquitous within 195 Broadway. Bosworth later wrote that he was "immensely proud" of the 195 Broadway design, from which he drew all of his subsequent Greek-inspired designs.

The main structure is 27 stories, including its attic and double-height lobby. The Dey Street annex, along the southern portion of the building, was an L-shaped structure at the corner of Dey Street and Broadway with an extension reaching Fulton Street. The westernmost 33 feet (10 m) on Fulton Street was designed like a campanile to fit with its narrow and tall form. The campanile is 29 stories high.

=== Facade ===
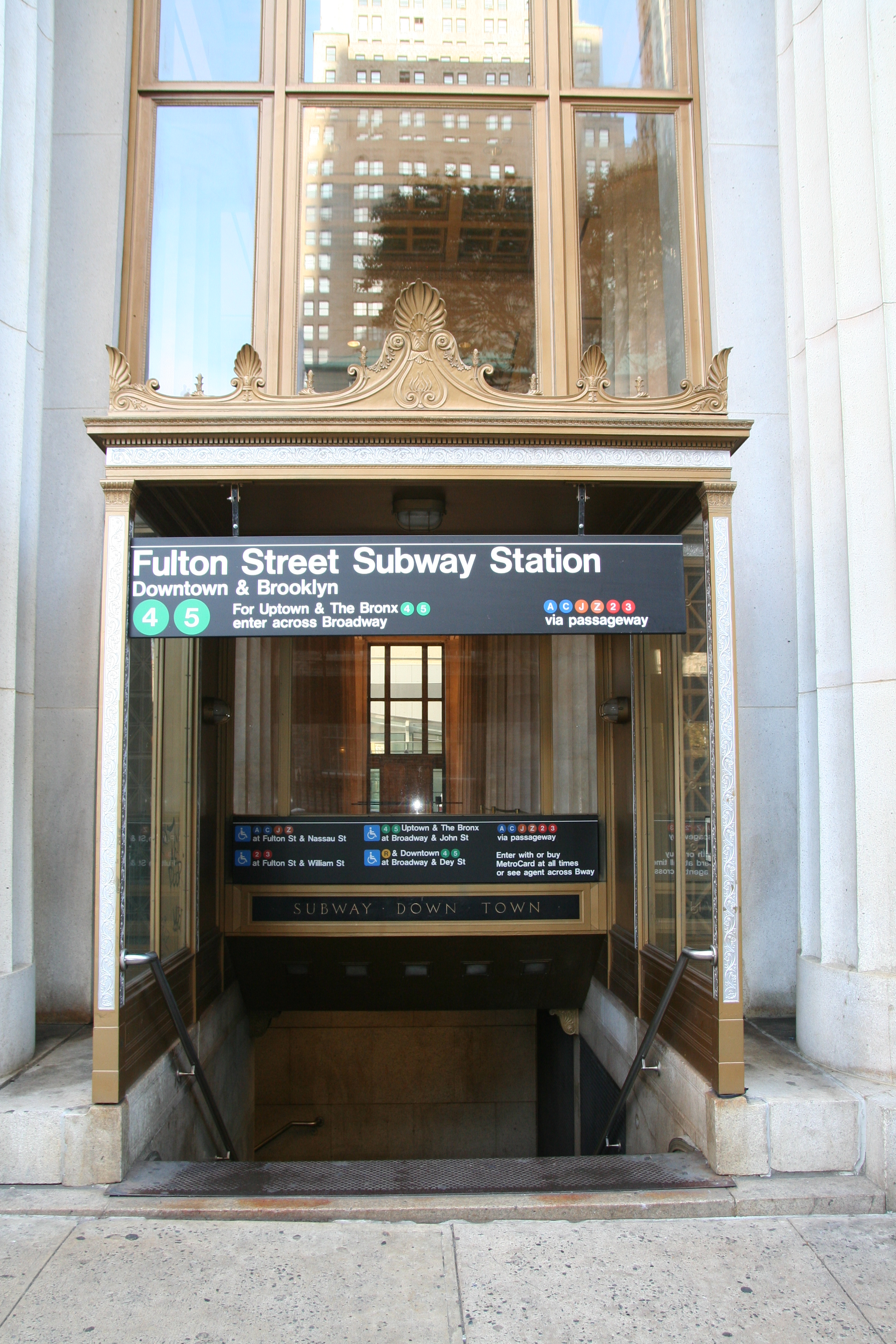
The subway entrance at Fulton Street

The facade is made of white Vermont granite. It was built in three sections: the western portion of the lot facing Dey Street; the extension east to Broadway with a small wing extending north to Fulton Street; and the corner of Broadway and Fulton Street. There are three sets of four bays on Dey Street and two such sets on Broadway; the "transitional bays" are plainer and slightly set back. On Dey Street and Broadway, each set of four bays is arranged so that the center bays are wider, and the columns at higher stories are slightly set back with smaller diameters. The Fulton Street facade, unlike the Dey Street and Broadway facades, is divided into two sections: the campanile to the west and the continuous eight-bay colonnade to the east. On all three principal facades, the first-floor bays contain entrance frames or window frames made of bronze. Wheelchair ramps are cut into certain entrance bays along both Fulton and Dey Streets.

The building's articulation consists of three horizontal sections similar to the components of a column, namely a base, shaft, and capital. However, unlike in other buildings where the base and capital were more elaborate than the shaft, the entire facade of 195 Broadway consisted of "sustained decoration of superimposed orders", similar to ancient Greek and Roman buildings such as the Septizodium in Rome or the Library of Pergamum in what is now Turkey. The facade was thus composed of a Doric colonnade along the double-height first floor, and eight sets of triple-height Ionic colonnades on subsequent stories. The Doric columns at the base supported a frieze running along the top of the first floor. The lowest story of each layer of Ionic colonnades contained mullions and spandrels made of stone, which contributed to the building's "solidity". A tall parapet at the building's top was intended to show "strength and solidity binding the columns", as did the structure's transitional bays. The entire facade was designed like this except for the campanile-like tower on Fulton Street.

On the Fulton Street side, the westernmost three bays comprise a 422-foot (129 m) tower whose facade consists of an ornate three-story base and a relatively undecorated 22-story granite shaft. The base contains two garage openings on the first floor; two pairs of bronze-framed windows on the second floor, with each pair separated by an Ionic column; and a colonnade on the third floor, articulated by vertical pilasters that contain various decorations. The top stories are flanked by Ionic columns. The roof of this tower is a pyramidal crown inspired by contemporary renderings of the Mausoleum at Halicarnassus.

The minor elevations are along the north side of the Dey Street wing and the west sides of the Dey Street and Fulton Street wings. The western facade of the Fulton Street wing contains relatively plain window openings, and the western facade of the Dey Street wing is a windowless wall mostly blocked by the Millennium Hotel. The northern facade of the Dey Street wing also contains window openings; the center section of this facade is windowless and contained a "light court" which was infilled during the 1960s.

The facade contains ornaments such as swags and wreaths. There are bronze spandrels with decorative friezes within the upper-story bays, and the facade of the top story under the parapet contains bronze lion heads. Foliated reliefs are located within the door and window frames at ground level, and antefixes are located above the shop windows and the Dey and Fulton Street subway entrances. The subway entrances also contained granite faces and bronze gates, and the decoration extended into the basement where the subway platform was located.

=== Interior ===
195 Broadway has almost a million square feet (93,000 m^{2}) of interior floor space, approximately 36,000 square feet (3,300 m^{2}) per floor. According to the Department of City Planning, the building has 1,094,861 square feet (101,715.9 m^{2}) of gross floor area. There were formerly 28 elevators serving the office floors, but as of 2022, there are 22 passenger elevators that travel from the lobby to the upper floors. The elevators are divided into zones, with each elevator only serving a certain range of floors. Specifically, eight elevators travel from the lobby to the 23rd through 28th floors; six elevators travel to the 15th through 22nd floors; and eight cars travel to the 4th through 15th floors. A single freight elevator serves all floors. The office floors contain varying ceiling heights. The 6th, 9th, 12th, 16th, 19th, 22nd and 25th floors have ceilings that are 13.5 feet (4.1 m) tall; the 28th floor's ceiling is 17.5 feet (5.3 m) tall; and the remaining office stories starting from the 4th floor are 12.5 feet (3.8 m) tall.

Sculptor Paul Manship designed decorations for the interior, including elevator doors, floor panels, and drinking fountains made of bronze. The bronze decorations in the lobby were removed when AT&T moved out during 1984. Manship may have also worked on the chandeliers and windows in the lobby, though the extent of his involvement is unclear. Lachaise was given the commission for the frieze lining the elevator bank on Fulton Street.

According to The New York Times, 195 Broadway is considered to have the most marble of any New York City office building; the material is so ubiquitous that it was even used for the fire stairs. The structure also incorporates cast bronze or nickel silver on its interior furnishings, such as window frames and door knobs.

==== First floor ====
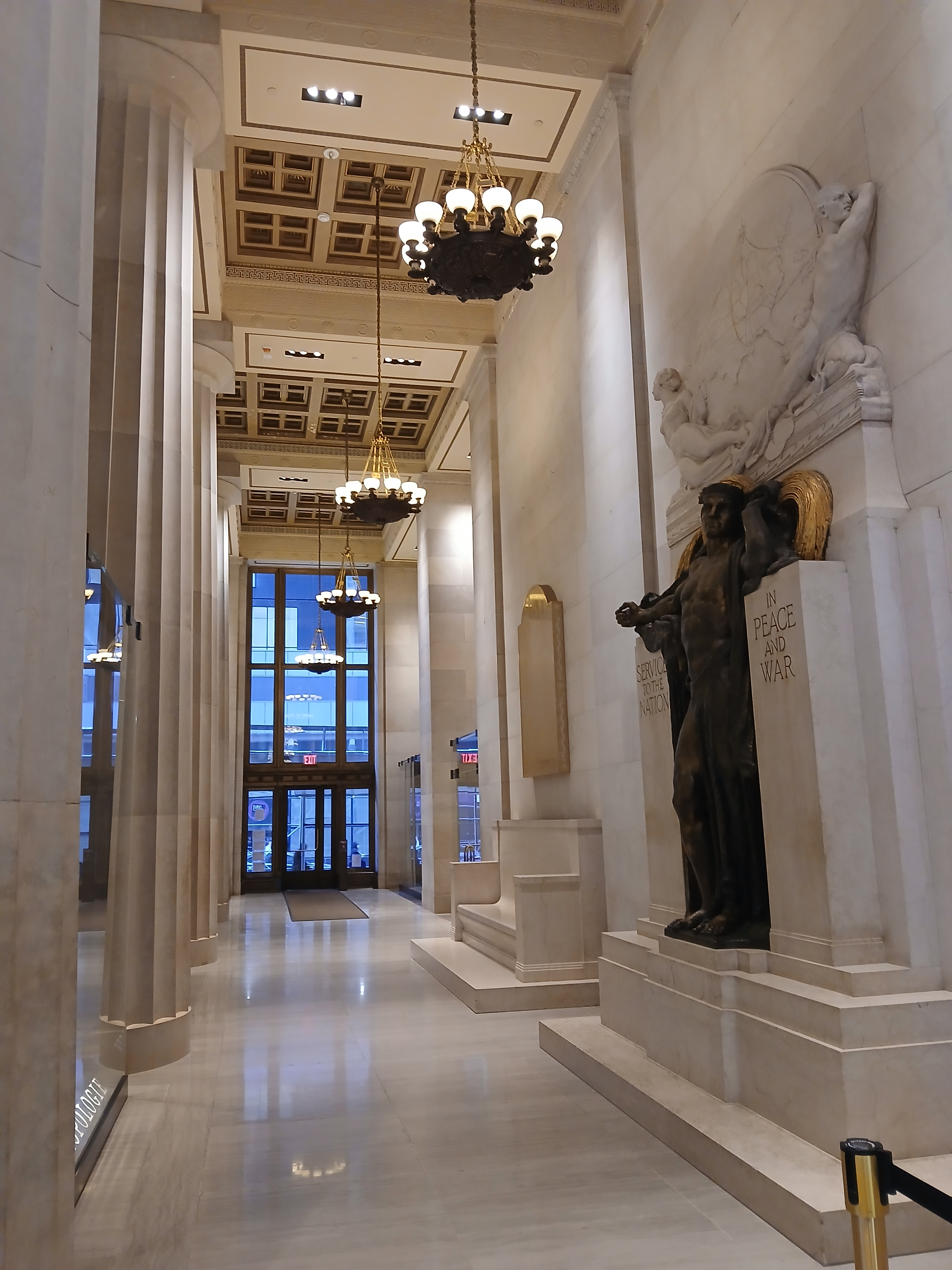
A lobby corridor on the first floor, running between Fulton and Dey Streets

The lobby has a ceiling 40 feet (12 m) high and contains 15,000 square feet (1,400 m^{2}) of floor area. The ceiling is supported by white marble columns in the Doric order; the interior partitions are also made of white marble; and the floors are of gray marble. The ceiling contains a grid of coffers punctuated by heavy, green-and-gold decorated beams. The directory boards in the lobby are also brightly colored. There are forty bronze-and-alabaster chandeliers hanging from the ceiling. As with the facade, the lobby includes bronze furnishings and is heavily influenced by Greek architecture. Among the Greek-inspired features of the lobby was a white marble mailbox with eagle carvings, modeled after a Greek stele.

The oldest section of the building, on the southwest side facing Dey Street, includes a lobby, shops, offices, fire stairs, and a narrow bank of elevators near the east wall. The elevators face eastward, toward the larger Dey Street lobby. The rest of the Dey Street (south) wing, extending eastward to Broadway, includes a main vestibule with revolving doors on Dey Street. It is surrounded to the north, west, and east by elevator banks. Because Dey Street rose gradually as it approached Broadway to the east, there are numerous slightly raised enclosures near the entrance bays on Dey Street. The space is further subdivided by low-height railings and partitions of marble. A corridor extends east to Broadway, where originally there were two revolving-door entrances.

Under the campanile on Fulton Street, there was retail space, later largely converted to a pair of loading docks 35 feet (11 m) deep. The Fulton Street (north) lobby also contains a passageway extending south to the Dey Street wing, and there are elevators on the south and east walls of the lobby. When the corner space at Broadway and Fulton Street was completed, the wall separating the new lobby to the north and the old lobby to the south was removed. The elevator banks on the east wall were installed, and more columns were erected inside the lobby to create a hypostyle-like hall. Cantilevered trusses were installed on the third floor to support the weight originally carried by the wall in the Broadway lobby. The corner section's construction included the addition of two more revolving doors on the northern section of the Broadway facade, three revolving doors on Fulton Street. This section included a store for the Benedict Brothers.

The Broadway lobby, on the eastern side of the lot, is separated from both the Fulton and Dey Street wings by the elevator banks along these wings' eastern walls, as well as a pair of fire stairs. Passageways from both wings' lobbies lead east to the Broadway lobby. The wings contain asymmetrical column arrangements, but this is not immediately visible from the Broadway lobby due to the presence of the elevator banks. Prior to 2016, the lobby contained minimal retail space. Following a renovation that year, the lobby was slightly reconfigured to include three storefronts separated by full-height glass barriers and connected by a galleria.

==== Basements ====
195 Broadway contains five basement levels, labeled alphabetically from top to bottom (i.e. the lowest level is called basement "E"). Basement levels B, C, and E contain storage areas.

The uppermost basement level, the "A" level, is adjacent to the Fulton Street station complex on the New York City Subway, serving the 2, 3, 4, 5, A, C, J, and Z trains. From the Fulton Street side, there is a direct entrance to the southbound platform of the IRT Lexington Avenue Line station (served by the 4 and 5 trains), which is directly under Broadway. Going west from Broadway, the stairs to the subway are located in the second bay, and are framed by a bronze surround. In the basement, there is a 75-foot-long (23 m) granite wall between the platform and the building. Within the granite wall there are bronze sliding gates and a long window separated by bronze mullions. The sliding gates used to provide access to the station, a purpose that is now served by turnstiles.

=== Art ===
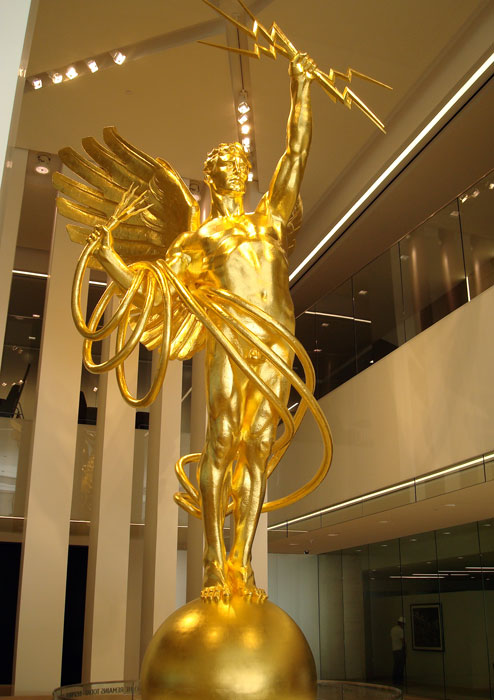
Spirit of Communication, formerly in the AT&T Building

The building originally featured a gilded bronze sculpture originally called Genius of Telegraphy, placed atop the pyramidal roof of the campanile in 1916. The artist Evelyn Beatrice Longman created a statue depicting a 24-foot-tall (7.3 m) winged male figure on top of a globe, wrapped by cables, clutching bolts of electricity in his left hand. After a court-ordered divestiture of Western Union, the statue's official title was changed to Genius of Electricity by the time it was installed. The statue was renamed again to Spirit of Communication in the 1930s, but has been better known by its nickname, Golden Boy. In 1984 when AT&T moved to 550 Madison Avenue, the statue was relocated to the foyer of 550 Madison; the statue was later moved yet again to New Jersey. As of 2021, the statue is located at the AT&T corporate campus in Downtown Dallas.

One of Manship's earliest public works was "The Four Elements", a set of four bronze reliefs on the lower facade of the building. The Manship reliefs are located above the revolving doors on the Broadway side, as well as at the spandrels within the four westernmost bays along Dey Street. The reliefs respectively represent earth, air, fire, and water. They were later replaced with copies.

On Fulton Street, above the third story of the campanile, is a stone relief depicting a personification of Electricity with a shield containing the symbol of Western Union; a bronze lion in the center; and a stone relief of Demeter holding a torch.

In the lobby, Gaston Lachaise originally planned to design a 22-foot (6.7 m) "marble statue of a young woman" along the eastern wall of the Broadway elevator lobby, though this work was not installed. Instead, this space was occupied by Service to the Nation in Peace and War (1928), an allegorical group by Chester Beach. The piece, in bronze and marble, depicts personifications of telecommunications, war, and peace.

== History ==
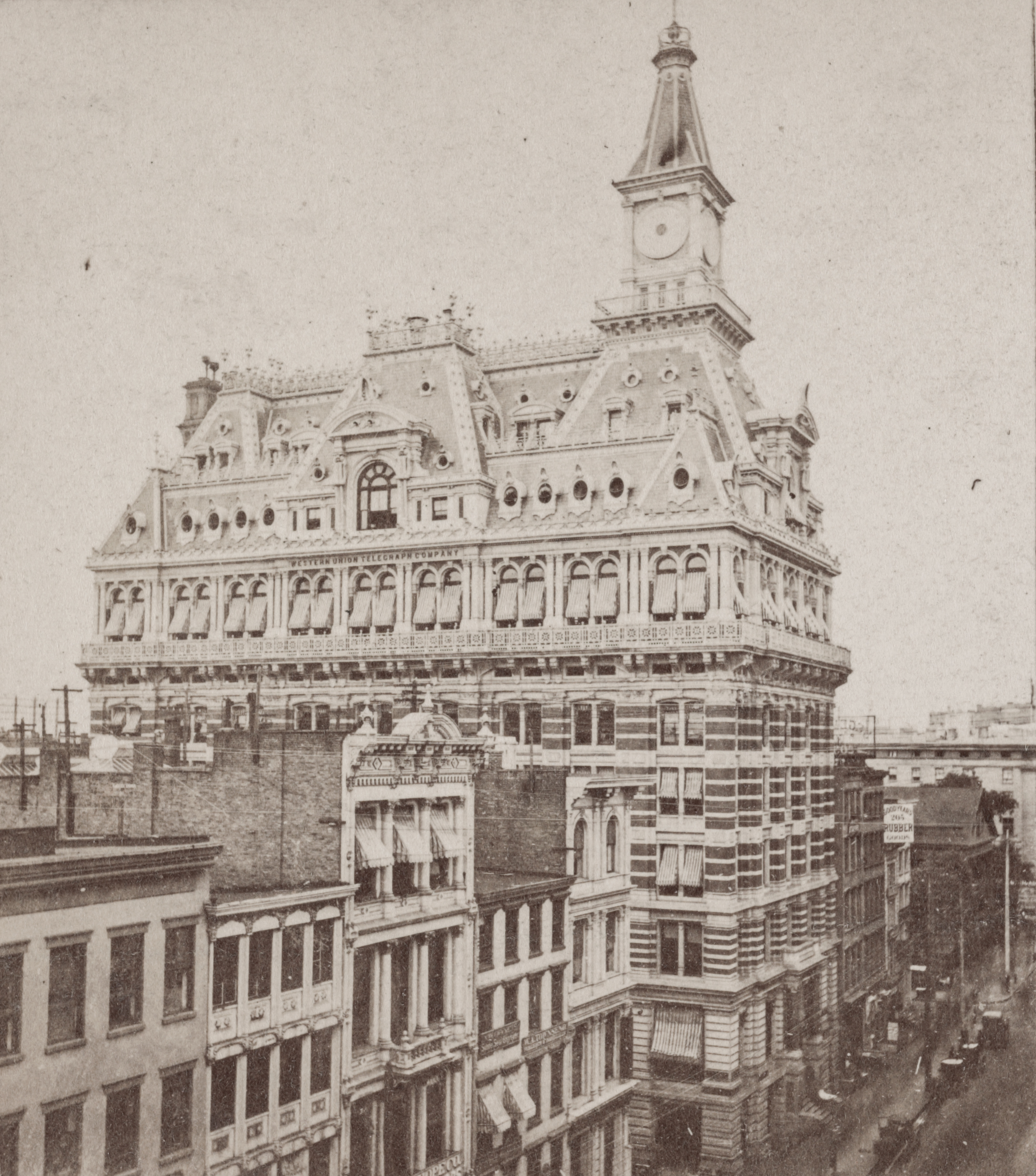
The Western Union Telegraph Building was previously located on the site of today's 195 Broadway.

From its 1885 establishment to 1910, AT&T was headquartered at 125 Milk Street in Boston. The current building at 195 Broadway was constructed under the leadership of AT&T's president Theodore Newton Vail, who had taken the role in 1907 and assumed the same title at Western Union in 1909 when that firm was purchased by AT&T. At the time, the site was occupied by the Western Union Telegraph Building.

In 1910, AT&T revealed plans to improve Western Union's offices "for the accommodation of the public and the welfare" of workers. Bosworth, who designed the John D. Rockefeller estate at Kykuit, was offered the commission to design a headquarters building at 195 Broadway in November 1911. Simultaneously, work proceeded on 24 Walker Street, (Note: Now the site of 32 Avenue of the Americas) a shared-operations building erected further north between 1911 and 1914.

=== Construction ===
In 1912, plans were devised for a 29-story headquarters building that would be constructed on the western sidewalk of Broadway on the block stretching from Dey Street to Fulton Street. The plan entailed constructing one wing on the Dey Street corner, followed by the second wing on the Fulton Street corner.

To minimize disruption to Western Union's operations, the new building was constructed in several portions, and the 195 Broadway Corporation was organized to take over operation of the existing structure. Work began first on the Dey Street annex; the Western Union Building annex at 14–18 Dey Street was demolished in 1912. The New York Associated Press, an occupant of the old building, moved to 51 Chambers Street in April 1914; Western Union employees moved to Walker Street two months later. The Dey Street annex was completed by late 1914. As the building had not yet been finished, Alexander Graham Bell made the first transcontinental telephone call in January 1915 from a company building on the south side of Dey Street. The Broadway and Fulton Street wings then commenced construction. The new 195 Broadway building was declared completed in 1916, upon which 3,500 employees of AT&T and its subsidiaries moved into the structure.

The 195 Broadway Corporation also bought numerous adjacent plots of land to ensure that the new structure would be compliant with the upcoming 1916 Zoning Resolution, which established limits in building massing at certain heights. Specifically, the Mail and Express Building between Dey and Fulton Streets was acquired in February 1916, followed by the acquisition of the four-story 205 Broadway building at Fulton Street in July, days before the zoning law took effect. An agreement was made with the Interborough Rapid Transit Company (IRT) to construct an entrance and exit from the base of 195 Broadway to the Fulton Street subway station in 1915. An exit on Broadway opened in August 1916, and an entrance on Dey Street opened that October.

Bosworth was then directed to prepare plans for three 27-story annexes. Material shortages due to World War I prevented the expansion, and there were numerous holdouts. The 195 Broadway Corp. purchased the New York Law School structures at 172–174 Fulton Street in August 1918, at which point it owned almost the entire block bounded by Broadway and Dey, Fulton, and Church Streets. (Note: The site was bounded by Broadway to the east, Dey Street to the south, Church Street to the west, and Fulton Street to the north. The only lots not held by 195 Broadway Corp. were the corners at Fulton Street; the lot at 176 Fulton Street; and 34 Dey Street at the corner of Dey and Church, owned by the Astor family.) However, the building permit had expired the previous month. Bosworth filed plans for a smaller addition to complete the corner of Fulton Street and Broadway in December 1919; it was initially denied for violating the zoning law's height restriction, but the following month, the city board of appeals allowed construction to proceed. The corner section was finished in 1922, thereby completing the original headquarters. This section included a store for the Benedict Brothers, jewelers who held-out during the original construction and only agreed to give up their building in exchange for retail space in the building.

=== AT&T headquarters ===
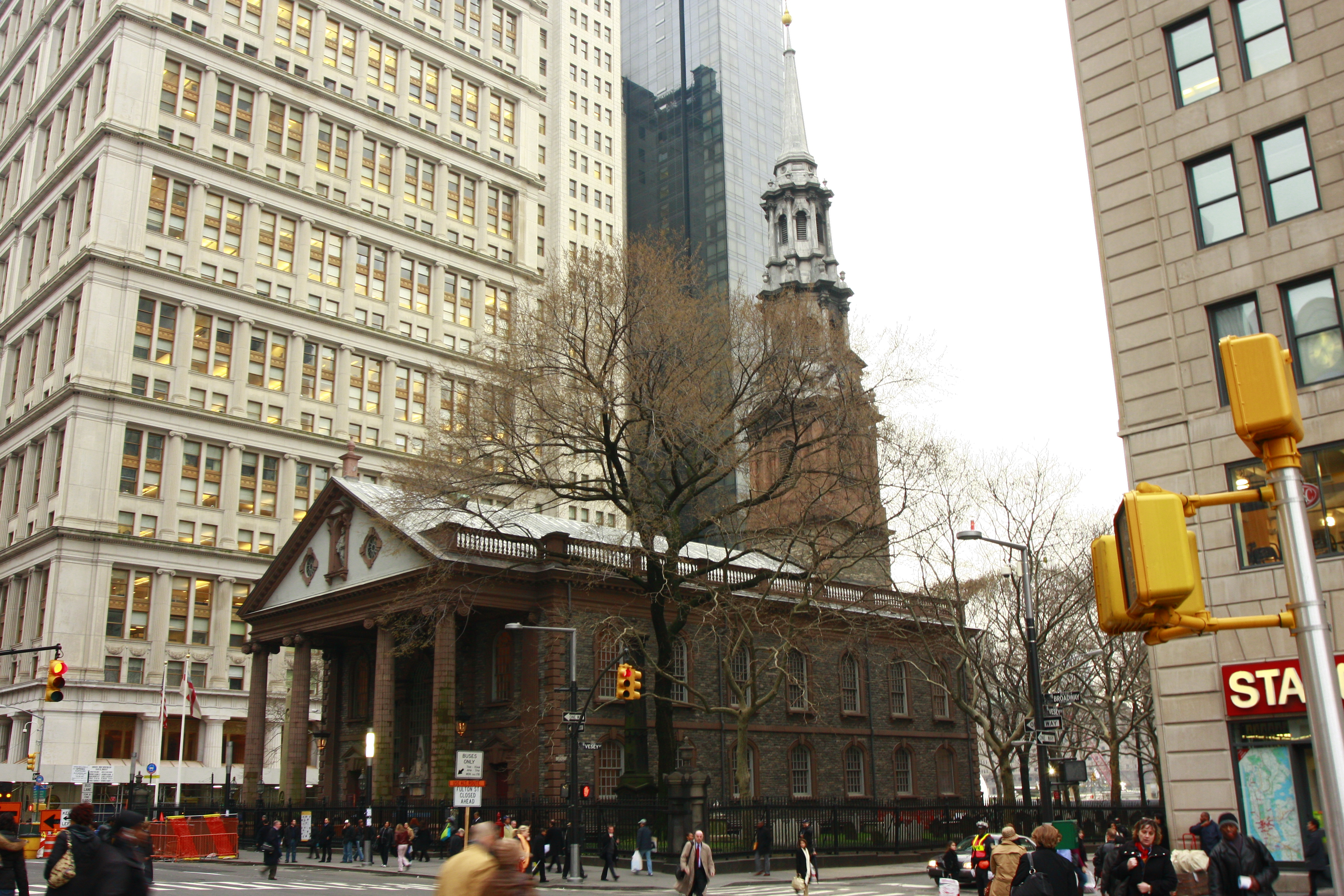
195 Broadway is to the left of St. Paul's Chapel.

195 Broadway's name changed several times in its early years, reflecting changes in its ownership. 195 Broadway was referred to as the "Western Union Building" during its construction and as the "Telephone and Telegraph Building" after completion. AT&T settled on the American Telephone & Telegraph Building name in the 1920s, which the building retained through the 1980s. 195 Broadway was closely associated with AT&T, and the 195 Broadway Corporation came to encompass all of the company's real estate holdings until AT&T moved out during the 1980s.

Vail retired in 1919, shortly after 195 Broadway was finished; the new AT&T president, Henry Bates Thayer, helped grow the company into an international telecommunications company. While in use as AT&T headquarters, 195 Broadway was the site of one end of the first transcontinental telephone call in 1923. The same building was the New York end of the first intercity Picturephone call in 1927 and of the first transatlantic telephone call, made to London, England, also in 1927. The company also founded radio station WEAF, which broadcast from 195 Broadway's Fulton Street tower and continued to do so after its 1925 purchase by RCA. In 1941, The New York Times reported that work on the then-under-construction radio apparatus at 711 Fifth Avenue, the studios of RCA's NBC division, was controlled from "a single little room" within 195 Broadway.

Western Union started erecting a new headquarters at 60 Hudson Street in 1928. Most of the company's operations moved to its new Hudson Street building two years later. Western Union's ticker and messenger services, as well as the money-order department, were kept at 195 Broadway. Benedict Brothers closed their shop in 195 Broadway's lobby in 1938. The next year, AT&T decided to display "the most accurate clock in the world" on the northernmost window bay along the Broadway facade, a showcase of the successful timekeeping service developed by AT&T's Bell Labs. At that time, AT&T had developed a near-monopoly on the United States' telephone and long-distance service.

AT&T's Western Electric division outgrew the original headquarters at 195 Broadway in the 1950s, having made significant profits during the Cold War. In 1957, Western Electric started planning its own structure diagonally across Broadway and Fulton Street, and five years later, moved into its new 31-story building at 222 Broadway. As a result of AT&T's increased profits in the 1950s and 1960s, the company performed several renovations at 195 Broadway, including installing air conditioning throughout the building from 1959 to 1961. The attic, which formerly had benches and employee facilities for squash and handball, was replaced with equipment to support the air conditioning system. The facade was given a steam cleaning in 1963, in honor of the 50th anniversary of 195 Broadway's completion. AT&T planned to replace the bronze grilles and alabaster chandeliers, but this was canceled after objections from architecture writer Henry Hope Reed.

=== Sale and later usage ===
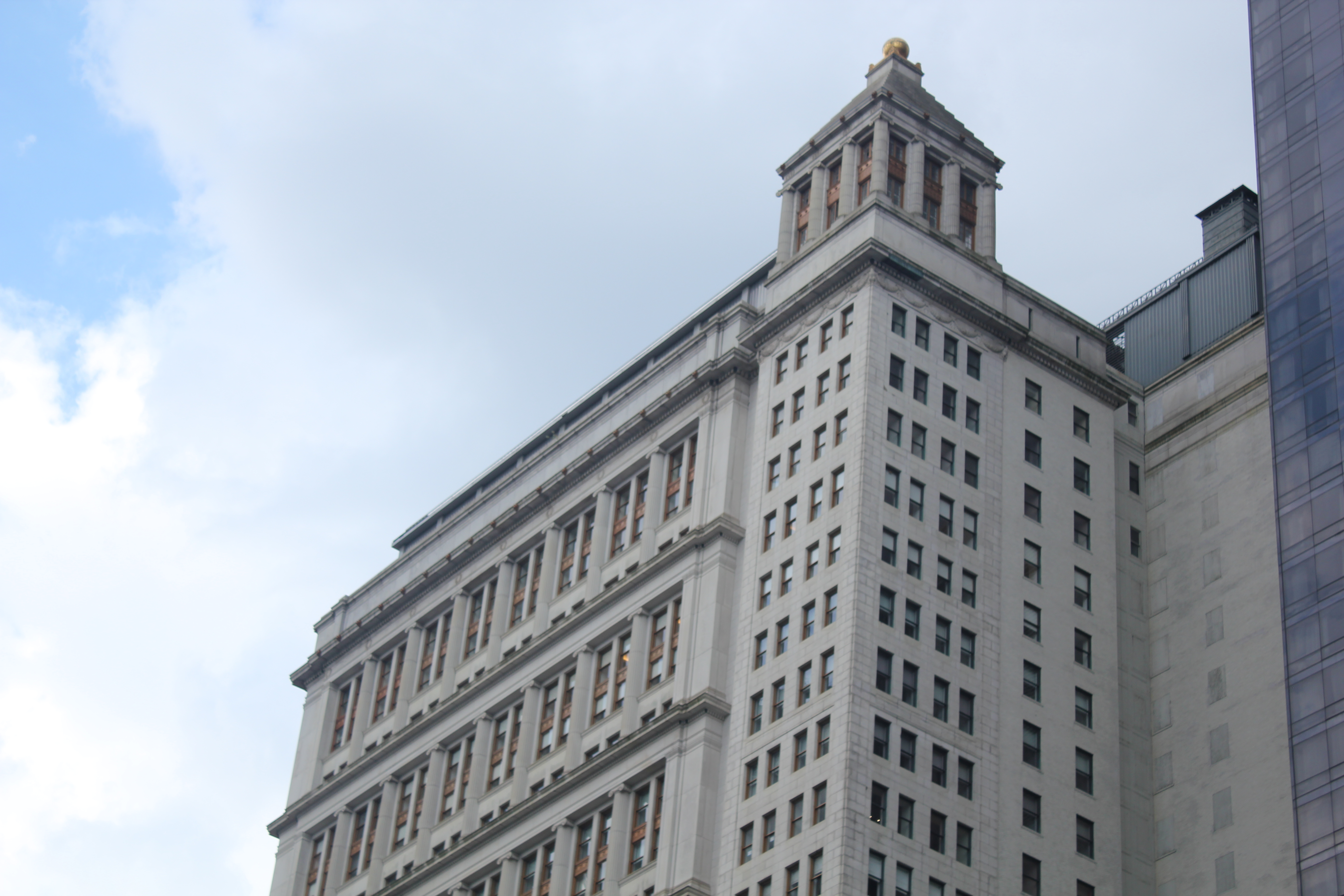
Looking at the tower of 195 Broadway from Church Street

In 1978, AT&T commissioned a new building at 550 Madison Avenue. This new AT&T Building was designed by Philip Johnson in the new Postmodern architectural style, and was completed in 1984, the same year of the Bell System divestiture. As part of the divestiture, 195 Broadway, and the rest of the block where it was located, was sold for $70 million to businessman Peter Kalikow in May 1983, using the profits to found a charity. AT&T removed the Spirit of Communication sculpture from 195 Broadway in 1981 for restoration and relocation. The company also removed Manship's original relief panels, which Kalikow replaced with replicas.

Subsequently, Kalikow made plans to renovate the structure and lease it out to office tenants. The structure's facade was given a steam cleaning; the paint on the building's bronze finishes was removed; and metal ornaments were painted or shined. Kalikow destroyed two smaller structures near the block's western boundary, and he initially planned to extend 195 Broadway all the way to Church Street as a 29-story office annex. The plans for the western side of the block were then changed to that for a hotel, but decided against that after marketing experts said a hotel would not be profitable. An office use was subsequently again considered, but dismissed since the floor area would have been too small for office tenants. Kalikow bought air rights from the adjacent St. Paul's Chapel to the north and changed the plans for the western part of the block back to a hotel. The plot was ultimately developed as the Millennium Hilton New York Downtown hotel, which opened in 1992.

Kalikow sold 195 Broadway to L&L Holding Co. and Beacon Capital Partners in 2005 for $300 million. At the time, Lois Weiss of the New York Post said that the building was estimated to be worth $500 million. The building's exterior and first floor interior were officially designated as city landmarks by the New York City Landmarks Preservation Commission in July 2006. As part of the construction of the nearby Fulton Center transit hub, 195 Broadway was to be connected to the underground Dey Street Passageway. 195 Broadway was sold again in 2013 to a group where JP Morgan Asset Management was the majority stakeholder. The ground-floor lobby was renovated in 2016 with the addition of three retail spaces. JP Morgan put the building for sale in 2019 with an initial asking price of $800 million. The structure was ultimately bought by two Korean organizations for $500 million while the ground story lease was sold to Safehold Inc. for $275 million.

== Notable tenants ==
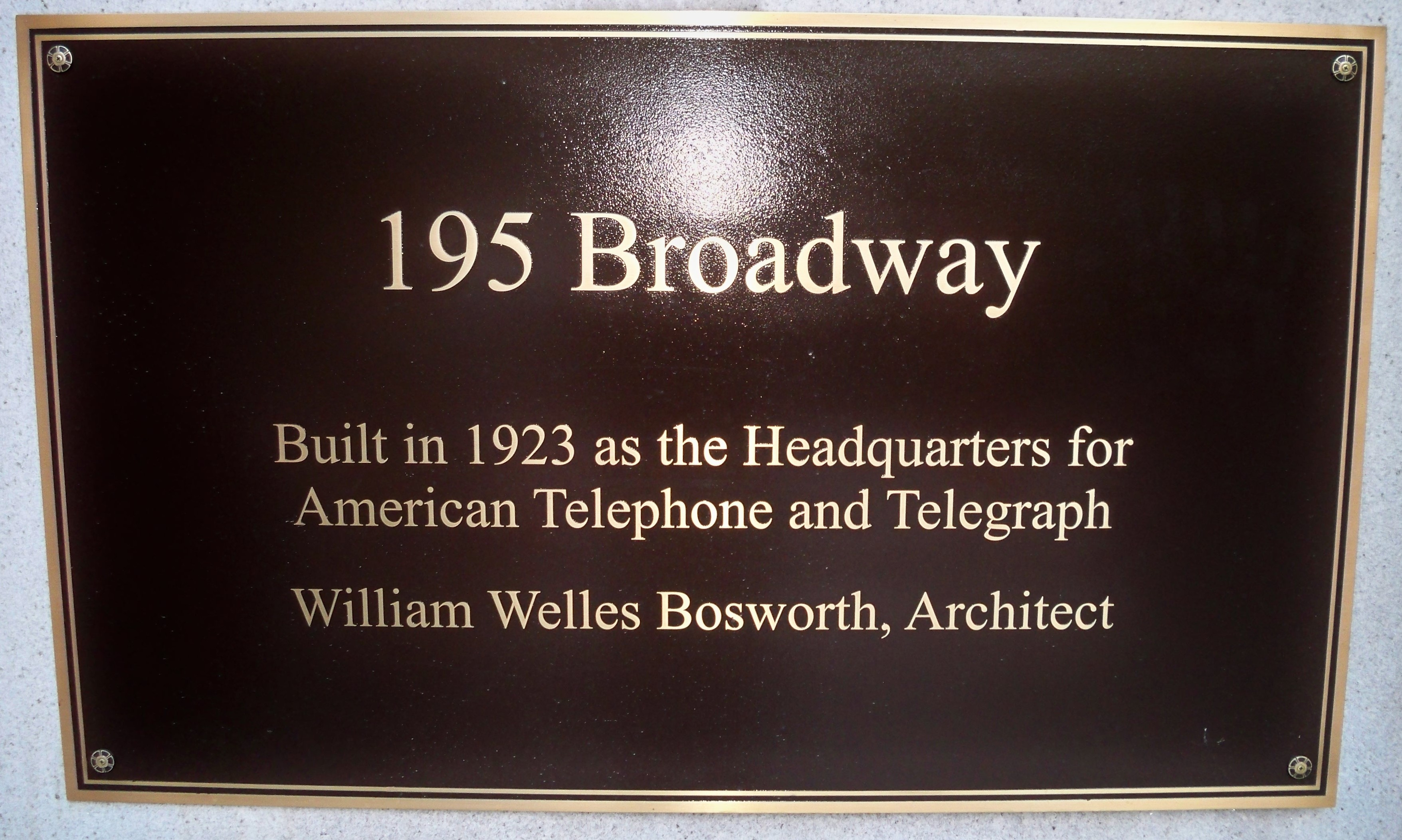
Commemorative plaque

As of 2026, tenants include:

- HarperCollins
- Omnicom Media Group
- Thomson Reuters
- Getty Images
- Abrams Books
- Gucci
- Payoneer
- Brooks Brothers, within one of the storefronts

== Critical reception ==
In 1914, a writer for The New York Times stated that Bosworth and AT&T officials had collaborated to provide a building that would serve as "an artistic addition to the towering commercial structures of the lower part of the city", with a well-planned interior design. Kenneth Clark, writing for Architectural Record, stated that the detail paid to the Greek-inspired features was among the building's "strongest points". In 1922, an anonymous writer in The American Architect: Architectural Review said that the materials of 195 Broadway "stand for permanency both inside and out". At the time, the neoclassical style was being used in headquarters buildings across the U.S., and Bosworth convinced AT&T officials to erect the headquarters in the Greek neoclassical style.

By the time Kalikow took ownership of 195 Broadway in 1984, he saw that the cast-bronze interior ornamentation had been painted, and said that "I got the feeling that what [AT&T] were trying to do was play it all down [...] They didn't want anyone to know they lived in a palace."

== See also ==
- List of buildings and structures on Broadway in Manhattan
- List of New York City Designated Landmarks in Manhattan below 14th Street
