= First transcontinental telephone call =

Telephone call made by Alexander Graham Bell

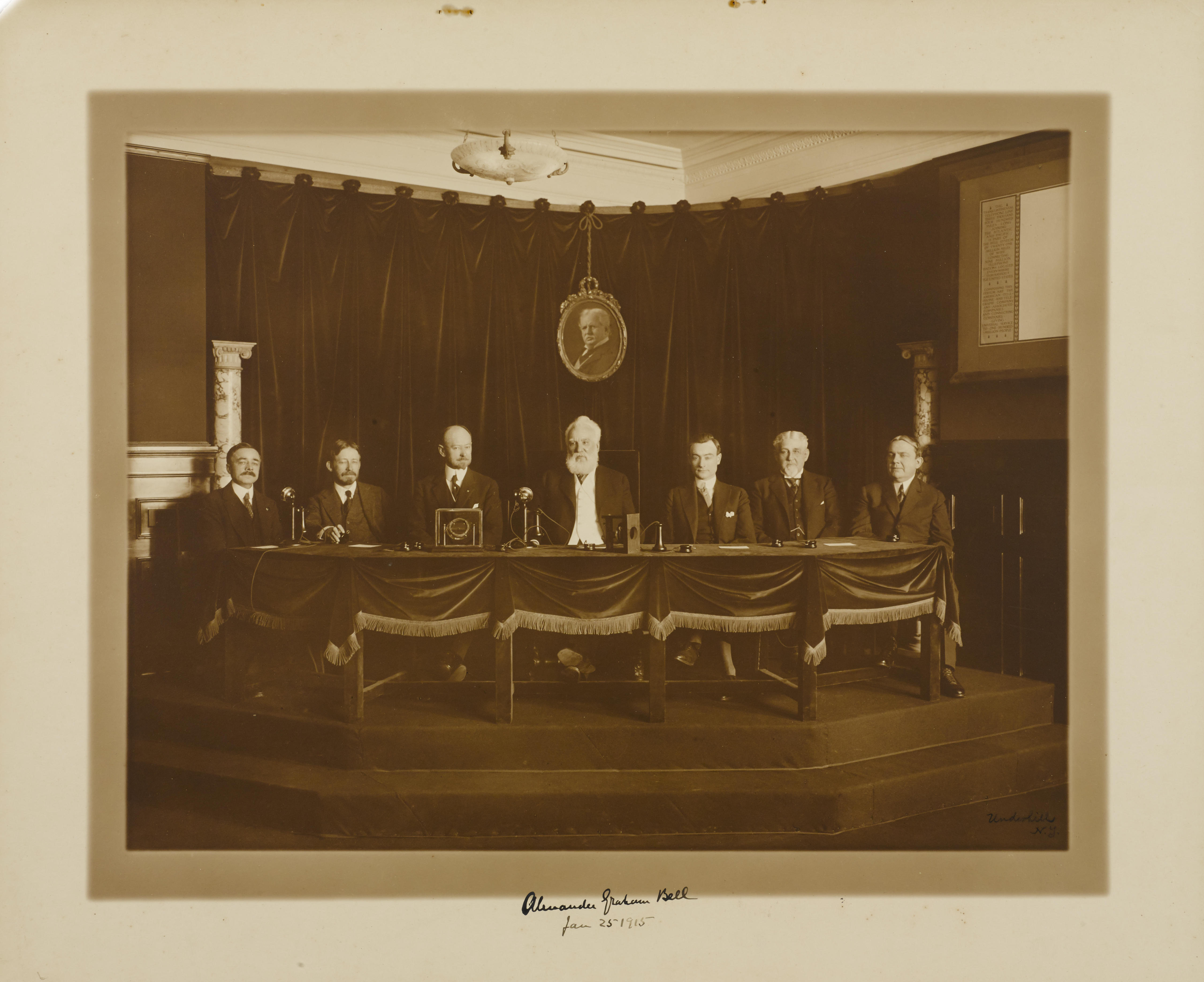
Alexander Graham Bell, about to call San Francisco from New York.

A telephone call, which for marketing purposes is claimed to be the first transcontinental telephone call, occurred on January 25, 1915, a day timed to coincide with the Panama–Pacific International Exposition celebrations. However, the transcontinental telephone line was first completed on June 17, 1914, and successfully first voice tested in July 1914. A 1998 U.S. postage stamp commemorates the completion of the line in 1914.

== Background ==
The original long-distance telephone network actually started in 1885, in New York City. By 1892 this line reached Chicago. After introducing loading coils in 1899, the long-distance line continued west, and by 1911 it reached Denver, Colorado. The president of AT&T, Theodore Vail, committed the company to a transcontinental line in 1909.

On June 17, 1914, after affixing 4,750 miles (7,640 km) of telephone line, workers raised the final pole at Wendover, Utah, actually on the border between Nevada and Utah state lines. Then, Theodore Vail, the president of AT&T, succeeded in transmitting his voice across the continental U.S. in July 1914.

Six months later, amidst the celebrations surrounding the Panama–Pacific International Exposition, on January 25, 1915, Alexander Graham Bell, in New York City, repeated his famous statement from 1876, "Mr. Watson, come here. I want you," into the telephone, which was heard by his assistant Thomas Augustus Watson in San Francisco, for a long-distance call of 3,400 miles (5,500 km). Watson replied, "It will take me five days to get there now!" The Alexander Graham Bell call officially initiated AT&T's transcontinental service. The phone call was merely symbolic. Dr. Watson was at 333 Grant Avenue in San Francisco to receive the call, placed by Bell from the Telephone Building at 15 Dey Street in New York City. President Woodrow Wilson and the mayors of both cities were also involved in the call as was Theodore Vail listening in from Jekyll Island, Georgia.

Later, President Woodrow Wilson spoke to an audience in San Francisco from the White House and is quoted as saying "It appeals to the imagination to speak across the continent." However, President Wilson was concerned with the "devaluation of the individual" as AT&T celebrated the achievement of the company rather than distinguishing individual inventors, contributors, and innovators.
