= Picturephone =

Videophone model

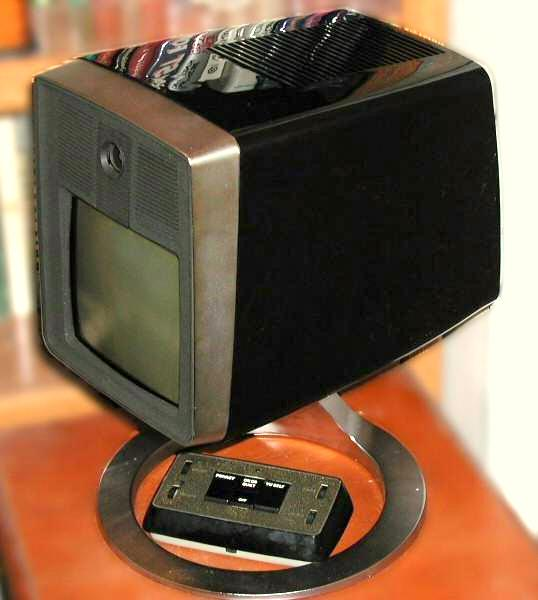
Mod II Picturephone

The Picturephone is an early commercial videophone produced by Western Electric for the Bell System under the AT&T brand. Picturephones had a vidicon camera tube to capture black and white video and a small cathode ray television tube to display it in a single unit that would be used alongside a more standard looking telephone unit. Audio and video could be transmitted over PSTN telephone lines.

Mod I Picturephones were displayed at Disneyland and the 1964 New York World's Fair. Mod II Picturephones were available for rent starting in 1970 and were primarily used in Chicago. Despite early predictions of a million sets being sold by 1980, takeup was slow and with a peak count of under 500 units in service, the Picturephone is considered a commercial failure.

== Background ==
In the United States, AT&T's Bell Labs conducted extensive research and development of videophones, eventually leading to public demonstrations of its trademarked "Picturephone" product in the 1960s. Its large Manhattan experimental laboratory devoted years of technical research during the 1930s, led by Dr. Herbert Ives along with his team of more than 200 scientists, engineers and technicians. The Bell Labs early experimental model of 1930 had transmitted uncompressed video through multiple phone lines, a highly impractical and expensive method unsuitable for commercial use.

During the mid-1950s, its laboratory work had produced another early test prototype capable of transmitting still images every two seconds over regular analog PSTN telephone lines. The images were captured by the Picturephone's compact Vidicon camera and then transferred to a storage tube or magnetic drum for transmission over regular phone lines at two-second intervals to the receiving unit, which displayed them on a small cathode-ray television tube. AT&T had earlier promoted its experimental video for telephone service at the 1939 New York World's Fair.

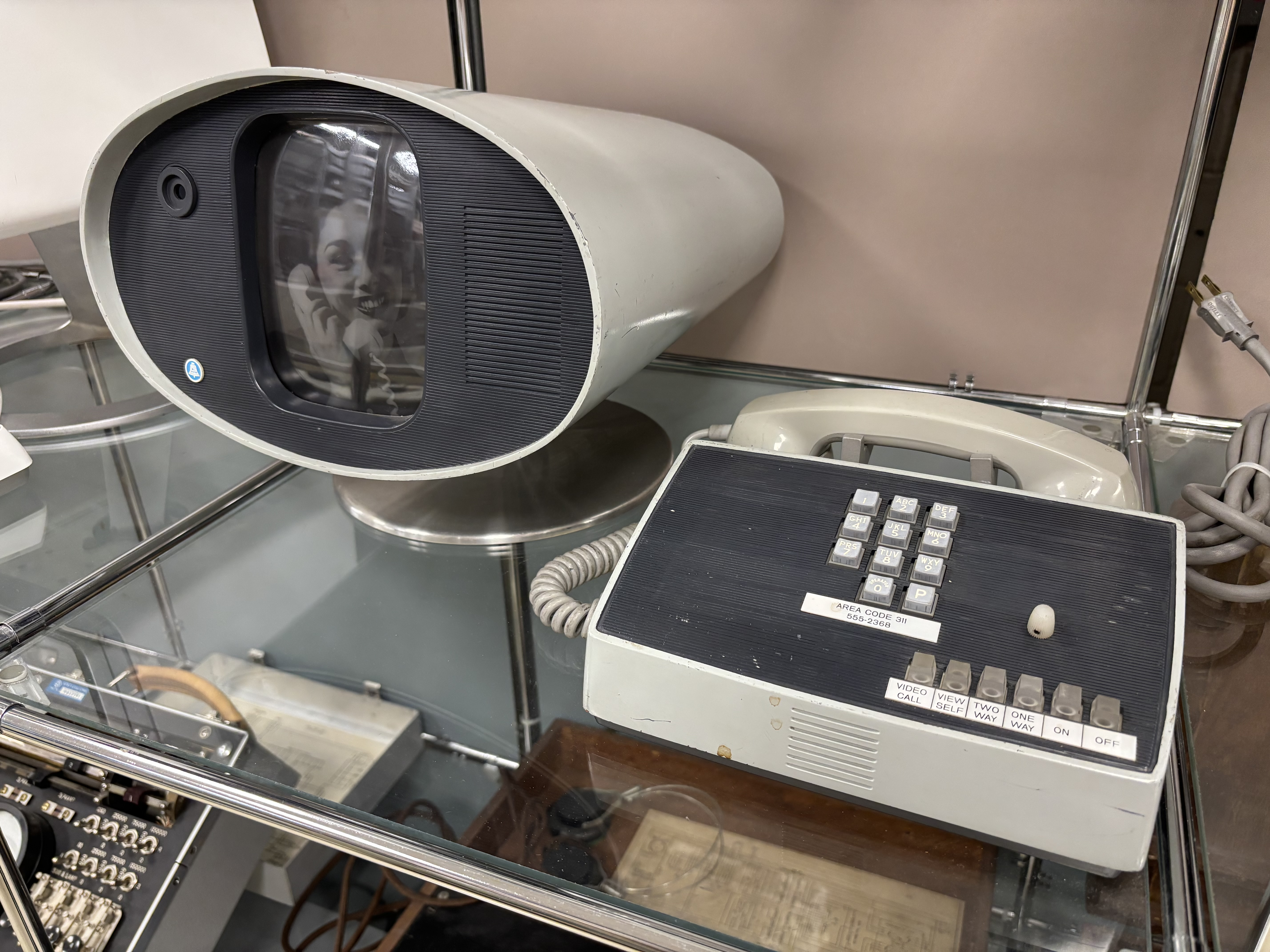
A Picturephone Mod I at the Connections Museum Seattle

== Picturephone Mod I ==
The Picturephone Mod I (Model No. 1) was more advanced than previous experimental models and had public evaluation displays at Disneyland and the 1964 New York World's Fair, with the first transcontinental video call between the two venues made on April 20, 1964. These demonstration units used small oval housings on swivel stands, intended to stand on desks. Similar AT&T Picturephone units were also featured at the Telephone Pavilion (also called the "Bell Telephone Pavilion") at Expo 67, an International World's Fair held in Montreal, Canada in 1967. Demonstration units were available at the fairs for the public to test, with fairgoers permitted to make videophone calls to volunteer recipients at other locations.

The United States would not see its first public videophone booths until 1964, when AT&T installed their earliest commercial videophone units, the Picturephone Mod I, in booths that were set up in the lobbies of New York's Grand Central Terminal, the National Geographic Society Headquarters in Washington D.C., and Chicago's Prudential Building. The system was the result of decades of research and development at Bell Labs, its principal supplier, Western Electric, plus other researchers working under contract to the Bell Labs. However the use of reservation time slots and their cost of US$16 (Washington, D.C., to New York) to $27 (New York to Chicago) (equivalent to $118 to $200 in 2012 dollars) for a three-minute call at the public videophone booths greatly limited their appeal resulting in their closure by 1968.

== Picturephone Mod II ==
The Picturephone Mod II's video bandwidth was 1 MHz with a vertical scan rate of 30 Hz, horizontal scan rate of 8 kHz, and about 250 visible scan lines. The equipment included a speakerphone (hands free telephone), with an added box to control picture transmission. Each Picturephone line used three twisted pairs of ordinary telephone cable, two pairs for video and one for audio and signaling. Cable amplifiers were spaced about a mile apart (1.6 kilometres) with built-in six-band adjustable equalization filters. For distances of more than a few miles, the signal was digitized at 2 MHz and 3 bits per sample DPCM, and transmitted on a T-2 carrier.

These Picturephone units packaged Plumbicon cameras and small cathode-ray tube displays within their housings. The cameras were located atop their screens to help users see eye to eye. Later generation display screens were larger than in the original demonstration units, approximately six inches (15 cm) square in a roughly cubical cabinet.

The original Picturephone system used contemporary crossbar and multi-frequency operation. Lines and trunks were six wire, one pair each way for video and one pair two way for audio. MF address signaling on the audio pair was supplemented by a Video Supervisory Signal (VSS) looping around on the video quad to ensure continuity. More complex protocols were later adopted for conferencing.

To deploy Picturephone service, new wideband crossbar switches were designed and installed into the Bell System's 5XB switch offices, this being the most widespread of the relatively modern kind. Hundreds of technicians attended schools to learn to operate the Cable Equalizer Test Set and other equipment, and to install Picturephones.

AT&T's advanced Mod II Picturephone (1969)

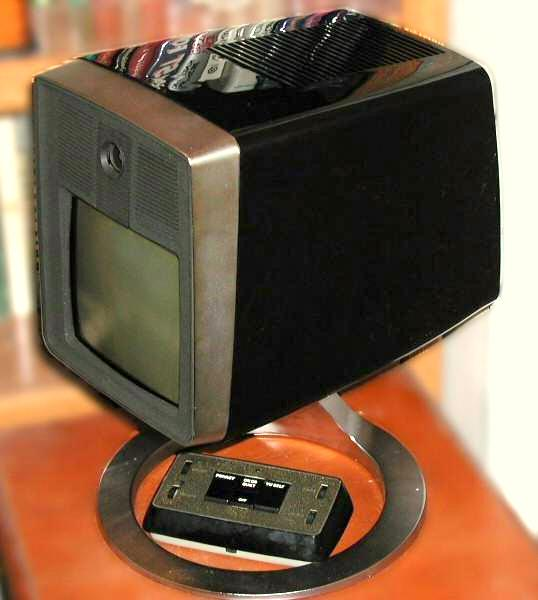
AT&T Picturephone (Mod II) fully enclosed in its housing, control pad at bottom

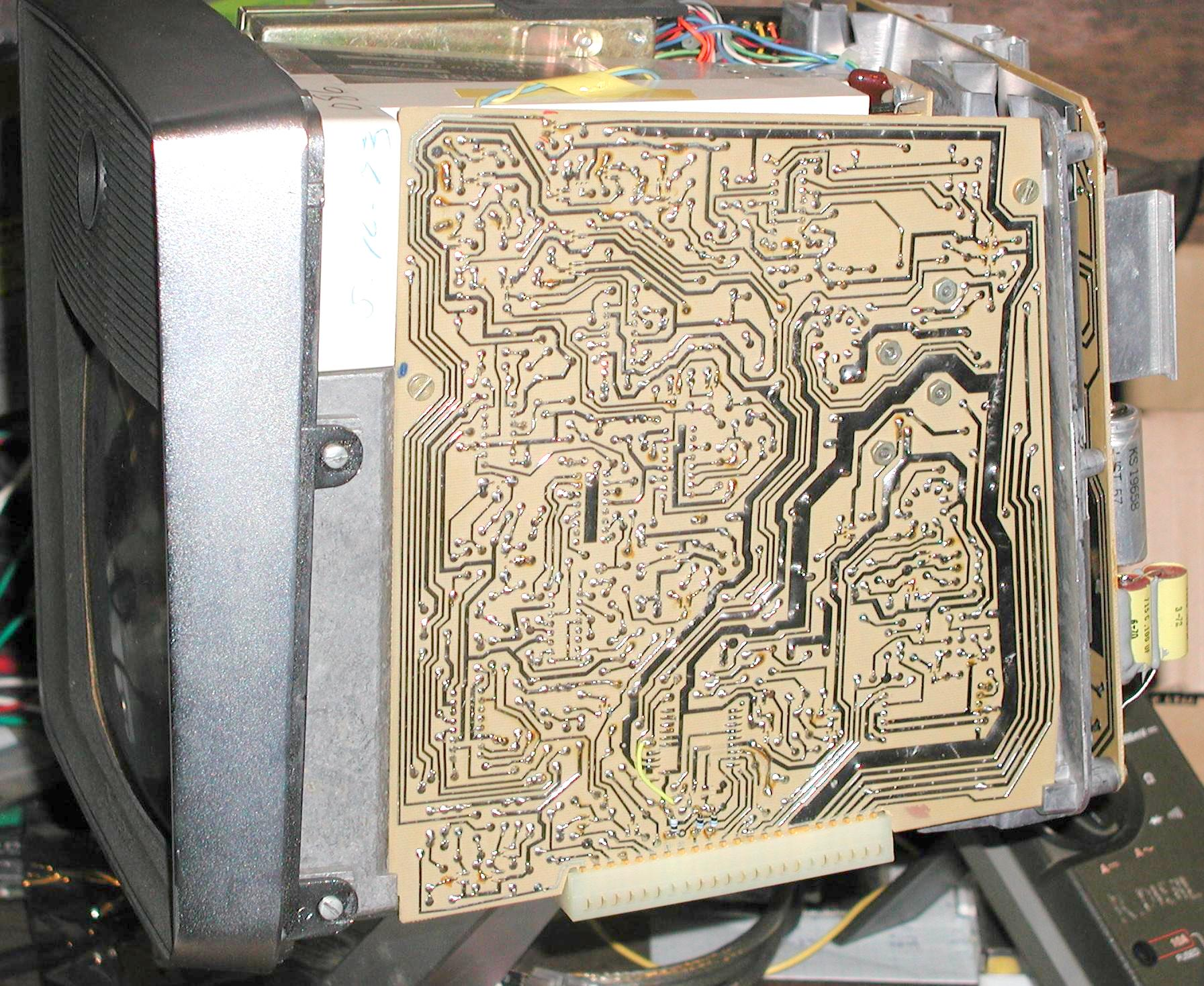
Right side view, housing removed, one of its printed circuit boards exposed

An exposed view of the Picturephone's rear circuit board
