= William W. Bosworth =

American architect

William Welles Bosworth
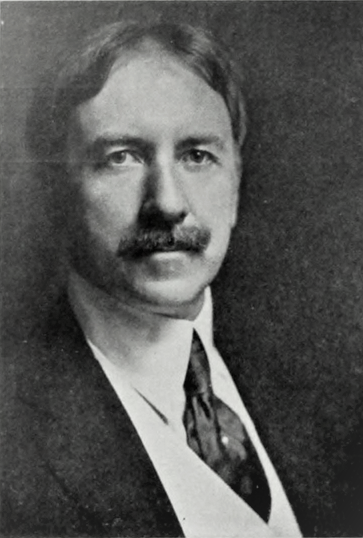
- (c.1915)
- Born: May 8, 1869; Marietta, Ohio, U.S.
- Died: June 3, 1966 (aged 97); Vaucresson, France
- Education: Massachusetts Institute of Technology; École des Beaux-Arts
- Occupation: Architect
- Spouse: Renée Marie Oberlé
- Awards: Legion of Honour; Ordre des Arts et des Lettres
- Practice: Carrère and Hastings
- Buildings: 195 Broadway; Kykuit
- Projects: Palace of Versailles; Palace of Fontainebleau; Notre-Dame de Reims

William Welles Bosworth (May 8, 1869 – June 3, 1966) was an American architect whose most famous designs include the Massachusetts Institute of Technology Cambridge campus, the original AT&T Building in New York City, and the Theodore N. Vail mansion in Morristown, New Jersey (1916, now the Morristown Town Hall). Bosworth was also responsible to a large degree for the architectural expression of Kykuit, the Rockefeller family estate in Pocantico Hills, New York, working closely with the architects William Adams Delano and Chester H. Aldrich, and the interior designer Ogden Codman.

Bosworth is not as well known in the United States as other Beaux-Arts architects of that time, because his career, under the auspices of John D. Rockefeller Jr., led him to France in the 1920s, where he was put in charge of the restoration of the Palace of Versailles, of the Palace of Fontainebleau and of the rebuilding of the roof of the cathedral Notre-Dame de Reims, projects Rockefeller was interested in and that he financed. In time, Bosworth was awarded the French Legion of Honour and the French Cross of the Commander of the Order of Arts and Letters, one of the few Americans ever to receive such honors. In 1918, Bosworth was elected into the National Academy of Design as an Associate member, and became a full member in 1928.

== Early life and education ==
Bosworth was born in 1868 in Marietta, Ohio, to Daniel Perkins Bosworth Jr (1841–1905) and Clara Mumford Bosworth (née VanZandt) (1845–1873). He has one older brother, Hobart and a younger sister, Clara.

Bosworth received his architectural training at the Massachusetts Institute of Technology, at the time one of the leading Beaux-Arts-oriented schools in the United States. He graduated from MIT in 1889. Bosworth took a trip to Europe with William Robert Ware, the founding professor of MIT's architecture program and editor of The American Architect. Bosworth later returned to London to learn more about Georgian Architecture from Sir Lawrence Alma-Tadema, a well-known classical artist of Dutch origin.

In 1896, Bosworth journeyed to Paris to study at the famous École des Beaux-Arts. Attending the École was a necessity for anyone who wanted to make a name for himself in the United States, especially during the years following the World's Columbian Exposition of 1893 in Chicago. Richard Morris Hunt, H. H. Richardson before him as well as Ernest Flagg, Charles McKim, John Merven Carrère and John Russell Pope, had all studied in Paris.

== Architectural career ==
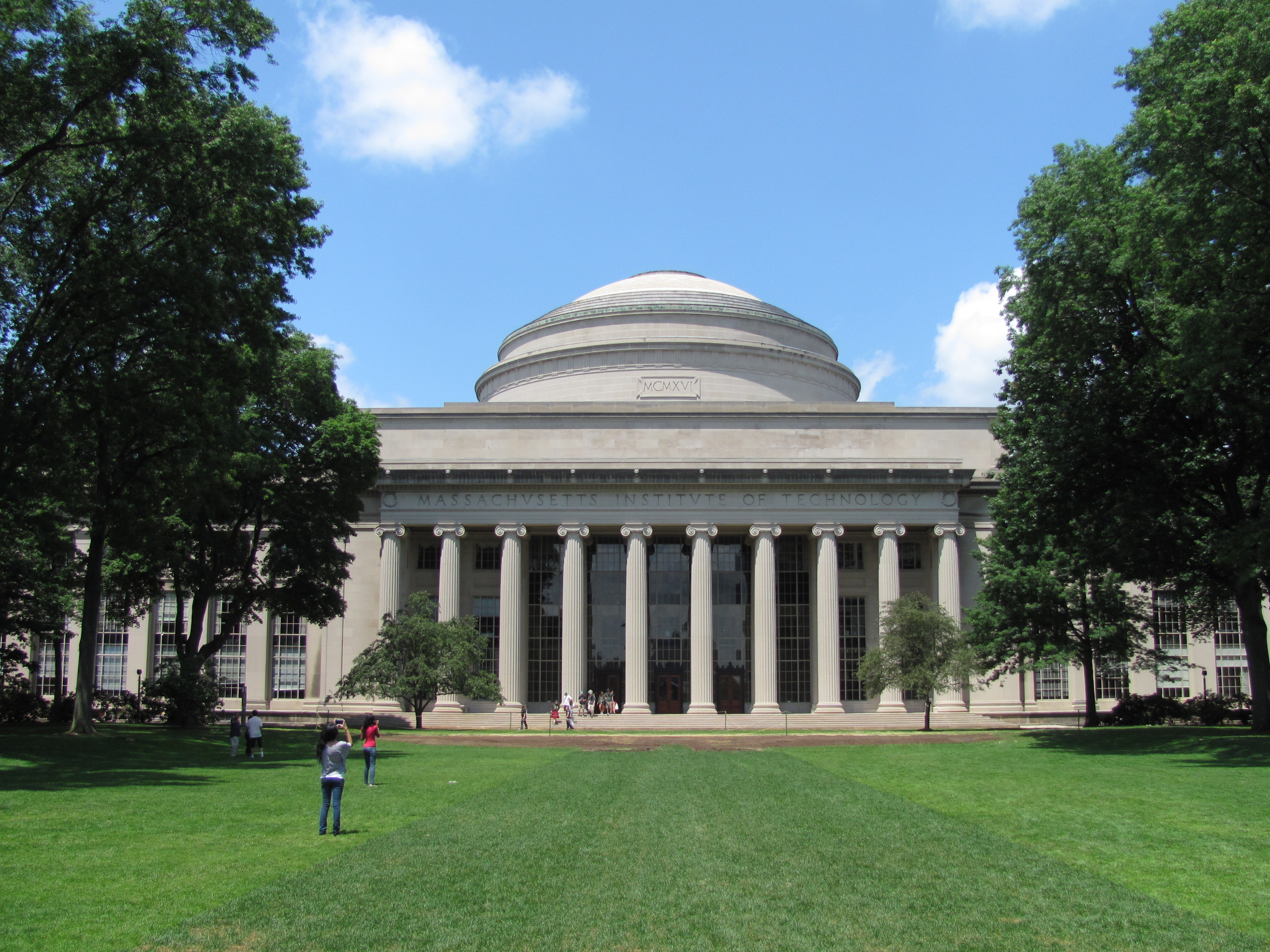
Bosworth designed the Cambridge campus of the Massachusetts Institute of Technology, including Building 10 and the Great Dome

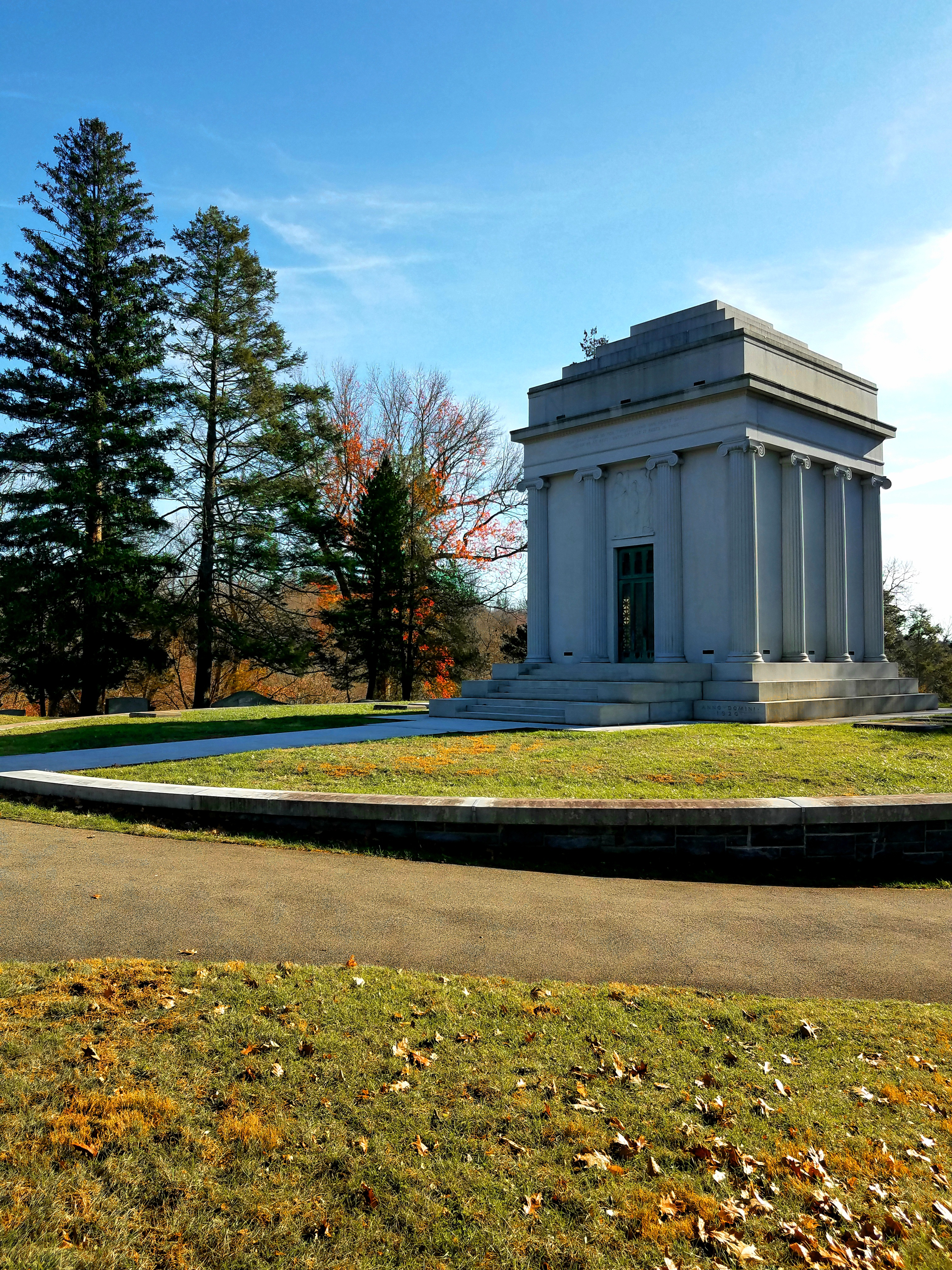
William Rockefeller Mausoleum in Sleepy Hollow Cemetery, Sleepy Hollow, New York

Upon his return to the United States in 1900, Bosworth worked for the firm Carrère and Hastings, which had recently won the competition for the design of the New York Public Library, their most significant and best-known project. In 1906, Bosworth was called in to design a garden for the prominent philanthropist, the New Yorker Valentine Everit Macy, who lived at Scarborough-on-Hudson. This led to Bosworth's acquaintance with Frank Vanderlip (1864–1937), president of the City Bank of New York, and former assistant Secretary of the Treasury under President William McKinley. Bosworth designed a gate for Vanderlip's family estate north of Tarrytown, New York. He also designed a schoolhouse not far from Vanderlip's estate, the Scarborough School, still extant. At about the same time, Vanderlip was appointed to the board of Letchworth Village, an institution for epileptics and the mentally ill founded in 1907. Vanderlip called in Bosworth to lay out the village with its various schools and residences. It is located across the Hudson from Scarborough on a hill not far from the current town of West Haverstraw. For the Rockefellers, he designed the gardens and main facade of Kykuit, transforming a barren, treeless site overlooking the Hudson into a lush and spectacular Beaux-Arts garden.

In 1912, Theodore Newton Vail (1845–1920) gave Bosworth his largest and most visible commission yet: the corporate headquarters of AT&T Corporation, located on a prestigious site in downtown New York City at 195 Broadway, just a few blocks from Wall Street. It was a modern steel structure clad top to bottom in a Greek-styled exterior, the three-story-high Ionic columns of Vermont granite forming eight registers over a Doric base. In 1913, Bosworth received the commission to design the new campus of the Massachusetts Institute of Technology in Cambridge, MIT having outgrown its old buildings near Copley Square in Boston. The plan featured a large paved court (now called Killian Court) that is now, however, planted with grass and trees, at the head of which was a domed structure modeled on the Pantheon in Rome in the manner of the Altes Museum in Berlin. At the time, it was the largest non-governmental building in the US.

Although some of Bosworth's subsequent American commissions were office buildings, like the Ocean Cable Office Building (1916) (since demolished), most were houses, estates, and townhouses. This included houses for William Barclay Parsons (at 121 East 65th Street) and Philip Gossler (at 14 East 65th Street) in New York. In the Locust Valley area of Long Island, commissions included "Mallow" (1920), a mansion for Walter Farwell which now houses the East Woods School, and house alterations and a garden for Charles A. Stone. Vail, who was a great admirer of Italian art and had traveled extensively through Italy, asked Bosworth in 1916 to design his home in Morristown, New Jersey. Bosworth also designed extensive gardens for the house of Samuel Untermyer, a famous lawyer in Yonkers and the imposing William Rockefeller Mausoleum in Sleepy Hollow Cemetery (both in New York's Westchester County). In 1925 he designed the unbuilt Egyptian Museum for Cairo. In 1921 Bosworth built his own house, "Old Trees," on Long Island next to that of Stone, inviting the sculptor Gaston Lachaise, with whom he had worked on the AT&T building, to carve four reliefs representing the four seasons out of sandstone.

Bosworth's American career, promising as it was, came to an end when he moved to France. John D. Rockefeller Jr. traveled in France in 1923, became appalled at the dire condition of French monuments, and made a donation of one million dollars in 1924, supplemented by another two million in 1927 to pay for the restoration of the Palace of Versailles and the Palace of Fontainebleau, as well as the rebuilding of the roof of the cathedral Notre-Dame de Reims. Bosworth was named Secrétaire Général of the "Comité Franco-Américain pour la Restauration des Monuments", a Committee created by John D. Rockefeller Jr. to supervise his donations. The five members were selected by the philanthropist and appointed by French President Raymond Poincaré. Former French ambassador to the United States Jean Jules Jusserand was given the presidency of this Committee, while American banker Henry Herman Harjes became its treasurer. The other two members were former Minister for Foreign Affairs Gabriel Hanotaux and historian and diplomat Maurice Paléologue who was also president of the Société des Amis de Versailles.

=== Later life ===
Although the Rockefeller project ended in 1936, Bosworth remained in his adopted country in semi-retirement, building a house (Villa Marietta) for himself and his family in Vaucresson (1935–1936). He was very active in animating the American Colony in Paris and founded the University Club of Paris in 1935. During WWII, Bosworth was chairman of the Paris committee of the American Volunteer Ambulance Corps. In 1945, he was named membre étranger of the Académie des beaux-arts. In 1949 he headed a fund drive for restoration of the village of Vimoutiers, which had been destroyed by an Allied bombing raid during the battle of Normandy. These efforts earned him considerable recognition in France.

Bosworth died at his home in suburban Vaucresson on June 3, 1966.

== See also ==
- Rockefeller family
