= New England Telephone and Telegraph Company =

Defunct northeast American communications firm

The first incarnation of the New England Telephone and Telegraph Company was a short-lived company set up to develop the then-new telephone. New England Telephone and Telegraph lasted only a year as a separate entity, from 1878 to 1879, and had no direct relationship with the later company of the same name, which after the breakup of the Bell System in 1984 became part of the NYNEX Corporation, now part of Verizon.

== History ==
The New England Telephone and Telegraph Company was formed February 12, 1878, by investors in the states of Massachusetts and Rhode Island at the behest of an agent of Gardiner Greene Hubbard, the father-in-law of telephone inventor Alexander Graham Bell.

New England Telephone and Telegraph merged with the Bell Telephone Company (which was started on the basis of holding "potentially valuable patents"), on February 17, 1879, to form the National Bell Telephone Company, at which time Theodore Vail took over its operations. The National Bell Telephone Company merged with others on March 20, 1880, to form the American Bell Telephone Company.

== Later acquisition of American Bell by AT&T ==
The American Bell Telephone Company was later purchased by its own subsidiary, American Telephone & Telegraph (AT&T) on December 30, 1899. Thus share ownership of New England Telephone and Telegraph evolved into ownership of AT&T. AT&T would later undergo mergers with SBC Communications and BellSouth to become The New AT&T.

== See also ==
- The Bell System, a name and trademark formerly used by AT&T.
- The Regional Bell Operating Companies, which were divested from the Bell System in 1984.
