= Bell Telephone Company =

American telecommunications firm

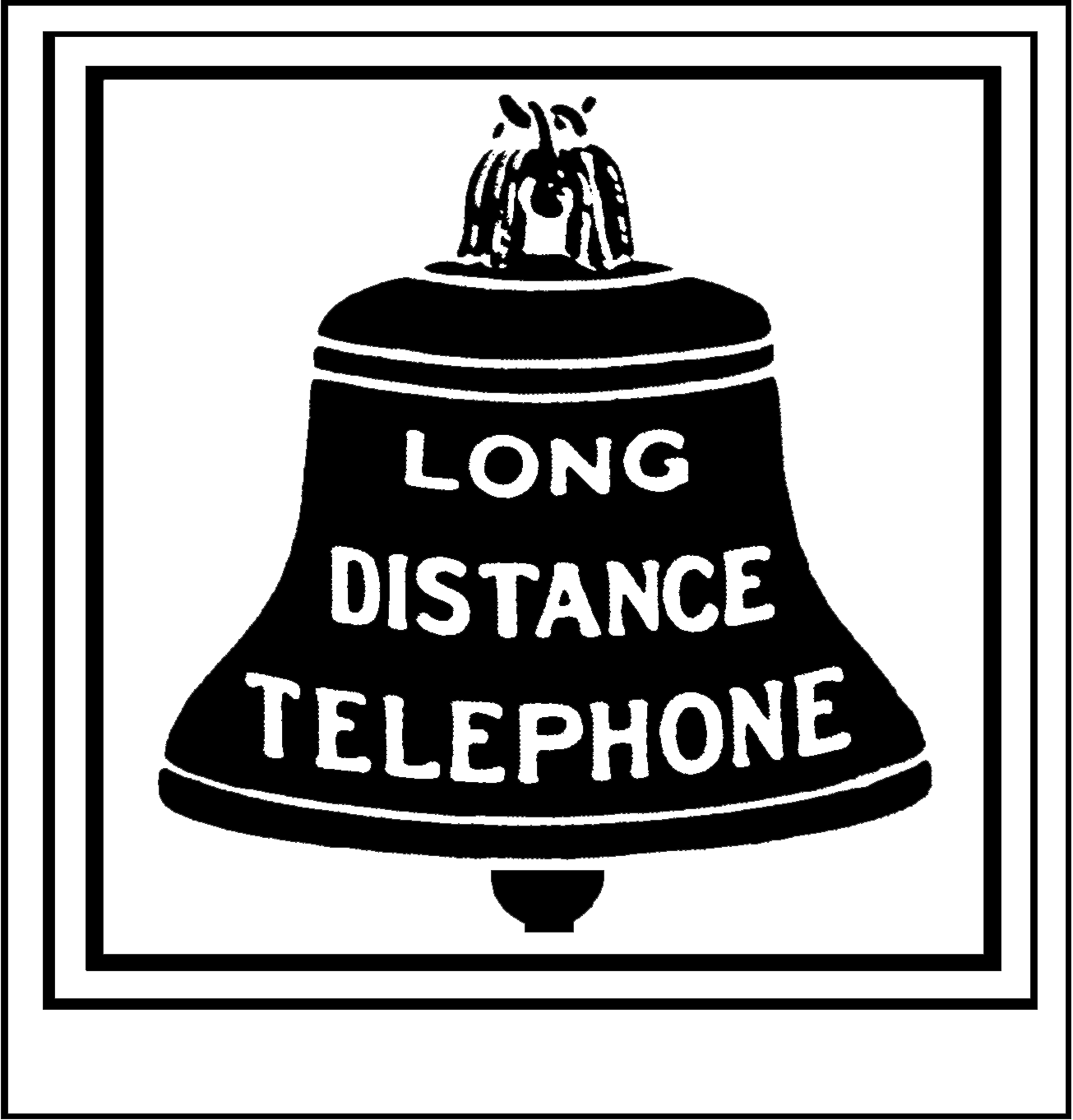
- Type: Public
- Industry: Telecommunications
- Founded: July 9, 1877; 149 years ago
- Founders: Alexander Graham Bell; Gardiner G. Hubbard; Thomas Sanders
- Defunct: 1899
- Fate: Merged assets with AT&T
- Headquarters: Boston, Massachusetts

The Bell Telephone Company was an American telecommunications company active from 1877 to 1899. It was the initial corporate entity from which the Bell System originated to build a continental conglomerate and monopoly in telecommunication services in the United States and Canada.

The company was organized in Boston, Massachusetts, on July 9, 1877, by Alexander Graham Bell's father-in-law Gardiner Greene Hubbard. A common law joint-stock company, the Bell Telephone Company was started on the basis of holding "potentially valuable patents", principally Bell's master telephone U.S. patent 174,465. Upon inception, Hubbard was installed as trustee, although he was additionally the company's de facto president, since he also controlled his daughter's shares by power of attorney. Thomas Sanders, its principal financial backer, was treasurer. Hubbard also organized the New England Telephone and Telegraph Company, the first local operating company to offer service using Bell's telephone.

Bell Telephone and New England Telephone merged on February 17, 1879, to form two new entities, the National Bell Telephone Company of Boston, and the International Bell Telephone Company. International Bell became headquartered in Brussels, Belgium. Theodore Vail took over its operations, becoming a central figure in its rapid growth and commercial success.

The National Bell Telephone Company merged with American Speaking Telephone Company on March 20, 1880, to form the American Bell Telephone Company, also of Boston, Massachusetts. The American Bell Telephone Company evolved into the American Telephone and Telegraph Company (AT&T), one of the largest telecommunications companies in the world.

== Predecessor to the Bell Company ==
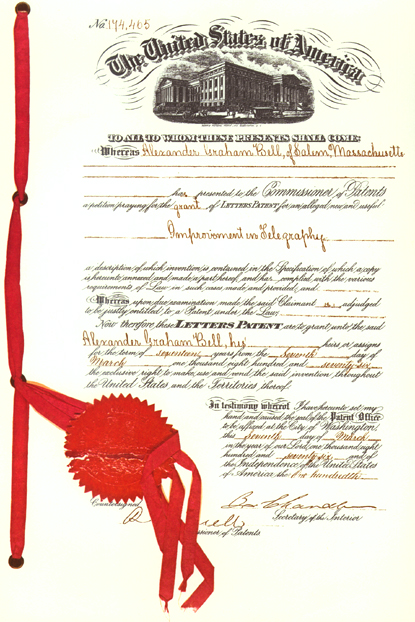
The master telephone patent (174465), granted March 7, 1876

The Bell Patent Association (February 27, 1875 – July 9, 1877, a name later assigned by historians), was not a corporate entity but a trusteeship and a partnership. It was established verbally in 1874 to be the holders of the patents produced by Alexander Graham Bell and his assistant Thomas Watson.

Approximately one-third of these interests were at first held by Gardiner Greene Hubbard, a lawyer and Bell's future father-in-law; Thomas Sanders, the well-to-do leather merchant father of one of Bell's deaf students (and who was the first to enter into an agreement with Bell); and finally by Alexander Graham Bell. Hubbard later registered some of his shares with two other family members. An approximate 10% interest of the patent association was later assigned by its principals to Bell's technical assistant Thomas Watson, in lieu of salary and for his earlier financial support to Bell while they worked together creating their first functional telephones.

The verbal patent association agreement was formalized in a memorandum of agreement on February 27, 1875. The patent association's assets became the foundational assets of the Bell Telephone Company.

== Earliest division of Bell Company shares and corporate evolution ==
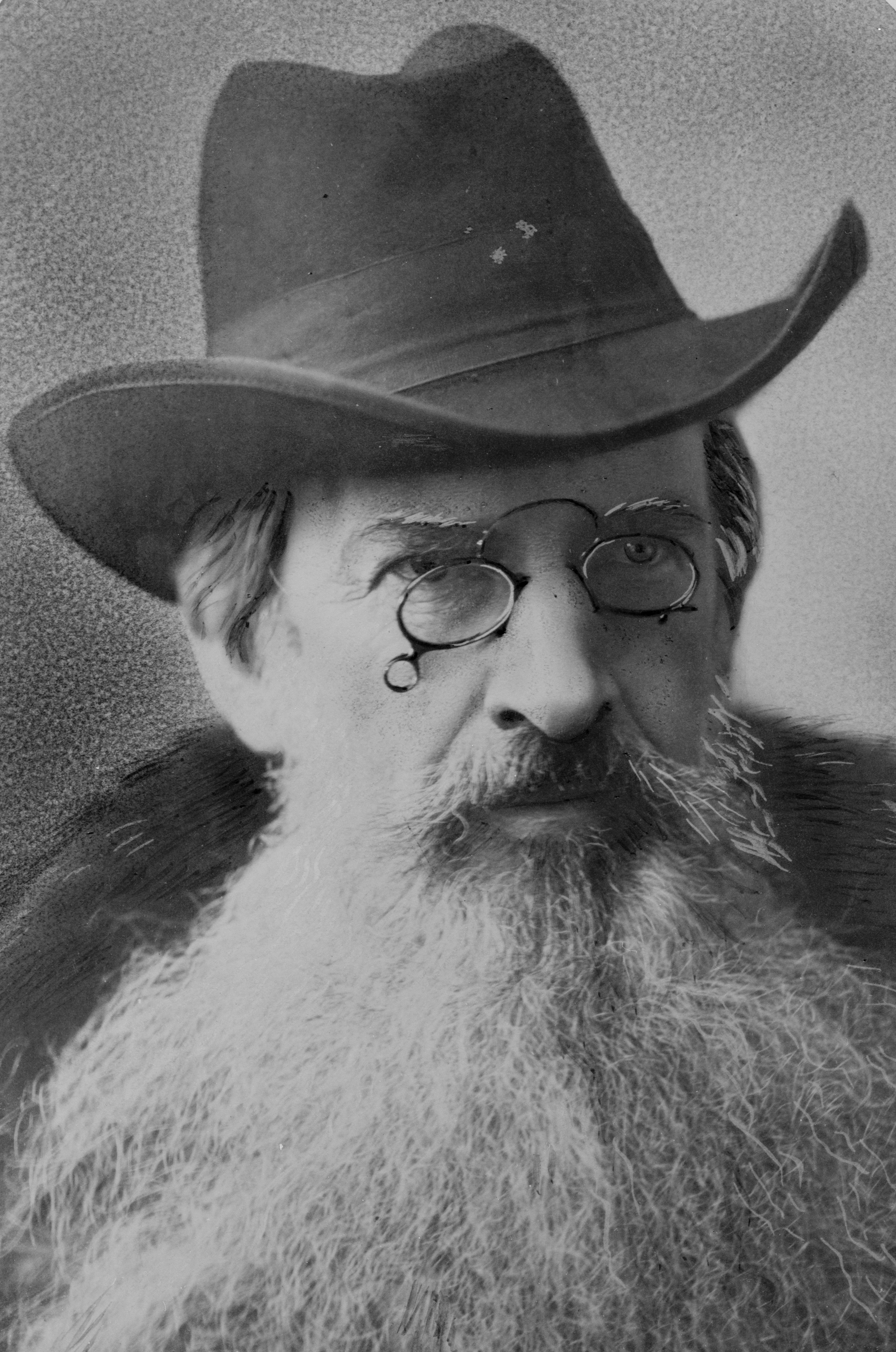
Gardiner Greene Hubbard, first president and a trustee of the Bell Telephone Company, and father-in-law of Alexander Graham Bell

At the time of the organization of the Bell Telephone Company as an association (also known as the Bell Company), on July 9, 1877, as a joint stock company in 1877 by Hubbard, who soon became its trustee and de facto president, 5,000 shares in total were issued to:

- Gardiner Greene Hubbard (trustee and president): 1,397 shares, along with
  - Gertrude McC. Hubbard (born Mercer, likely Gertrude Mercer McCurdy Hubbard, wife of Gardiner Hubbard): 100 shares
  - Charles Eustis Hubbard (the brother or nephew of Gardiner Hubbard): 10 shares
- Alexander Graham Bell (inventor and the company's 'Chief Electrician'): 1,497 shares
- Thomas Sanders (financier and treasurer): 1,497 shares
- Thomas Watson (head of operations, and its first full-time employee): 499 shares (Note: Bell's earliest joint agreement with Hubbard and Sanders had each being awarded a one-third share of their venture. However, the financing provided to Bell for him to conduct his research and development was inadequately low to the point that he had to continue teaching just to make ends meet. When the Bell Company was organized in 1877, an approximate 10% share was provided to Bell's engineering and mechanical associate, Thomas A. Watson, in consideration for his previous unpaid service and for the loans he made to Bell while they worked together creating their first working telephone.)

The Bell Telephone Company was incorporated in Massachusetts on July 30, 1878, with 4,500 shares of stock. It then merged with the New England Telephone and Telegraph Company (incorporated on February 12, 1878) to form the National Bell Telephone Company (incorporated on March 13, 1879, with 7,280 shares, later increased to 8,500 shares in May 1880). A little over a year later it was reorganized to become the American Bell Telephone Company (incorporated on April 17, 1880, with 73,500 shares, which included 14,000 trustee shares held by National Bell Telephone). American Bell's outstanding stock rose to 258,863 shares by May 1900.

Two days after the company's formation, on July 11, 1877, Bell married Hubbard's daughter Mabel Gardiner Hubbard, and made a wedding gift of 1,487 shares of his allotment to his new wife, keeping only 10 shares for himself. Bell and his wife left not long after for a tour of Europe that lasted over a year, during which time Mabel left her shares with her father under a power of attorney, allowing him to become the new company's de facto president.

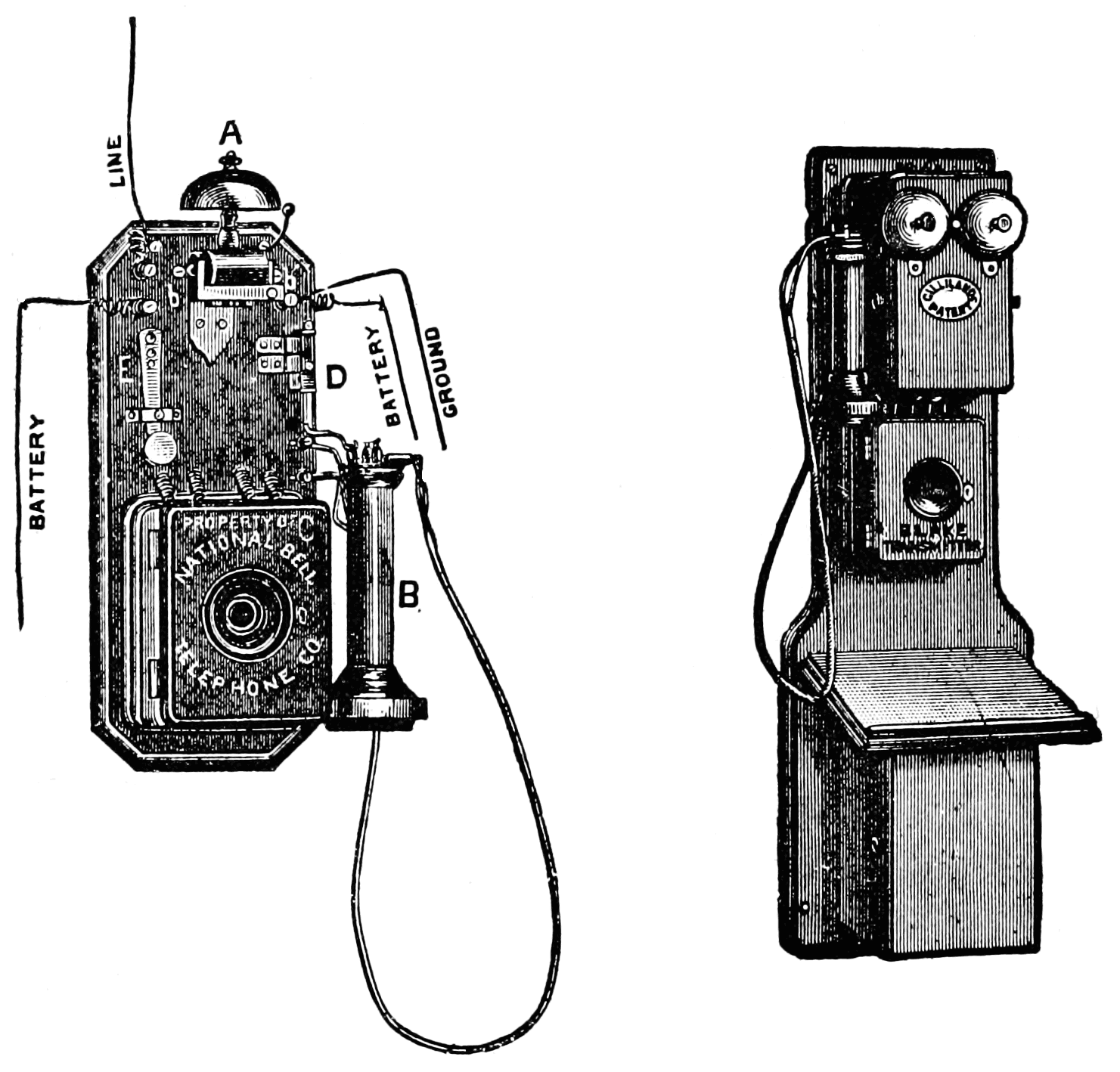
National Bell wall phone, 1907

Both Hubbard's and Sanders' roles in the newly born company were pivotal to its early survival and its eventual growth to become a corporate giant. Hubbard's very early structuring of its telephone service by leasing, instead of selling telephones, was critical to its success. He based his decision on the previous legal work he performed for the Gordon McKay Shoe Machinery Company, where its shoe sewing machines were leased, not sold, and royalties also had to be paid to the Gordon McKay Company based on the numbers of shoes produced. Hubbard insisted that leasing was the better option, even if it significantly raised the need for initial capital expenses. Sanders for his part, a wealthy leather merchant, provided most of the financing for both Bell's research and the young company, eventually amounting to expenditures of some $110,000 "before he received any reimbursement" by the sale of his shares.

Not long after the National Bell Telephone Company was established, it required substantial new capital in order to maintain its majority share ownership of its affiliate telephone companies and to provide further funds for expansion of its overall telephone infrastructure. On April 17, 1880, National Bell was split into the American Bell Telephone Company, led by Theodore Vail as general manager, and with the International Bell Telephone Company (IBTC) as a holding company for its international subsidiaries. IBTC's first non-North American subsidiary was the Bell Telephone Manufacturing Company (BTM), established by Hubbard at Antwerp, Belgium, in 1882. The Bell System's Bell Telephone Company of Canada subsidiary, wholly owned by the National Bell, had been established two years earlier.

Alexander Graham Bell's ten shares of Bell Telephone Company stock were later converted into a single share of the American Bell Telephone Company, and still later into two shares of the American Telephone and Telegraph Company. AT&T President Frederick Fish later returned Bell's single American Bell Telephone Company share to him as a memento after it had been converted and canceled.

Of the Bell Company's original shareholders, Thomas Watson resigned his position in 1881 with his shares making him a millionaire, thereafter living a colorful life as a Shakespearean actor and later as a shipyard owner and ship builder—always retaining his friendship with Bell. Thomas Sanders, whose entire personal fortune was virtually depleted during the Bell Telephone's first formative years (until a historic settlement was reached with Bell's fierce competitor Western Union on November 10, 1879), quickly sold his Bell shares for almost $1,000,000 but then lost most of his wealth with an investment in a Colorado gold mine. He also remained a confidant of Bell, who later helped ensure the welfare of Sanders' deaf son in his adulthood.

Hubbard was satisfied to leave the head of the Bell Company to another major investor, William Forbes, who was brought into the company as its president and as a member of its board of directors in late 1878. Under Forbes' leadership, a new executive committee was created at its corporate level to reorganize and run the overall company with professional management. The company was also recapitalized, with Vail continuing as its head of operations. After leaving the offices of what became the American Bell Telephone Company, Hubbard created the National Geographic Society as its president, with Bell succeeding him the next year.

Ownership of American Bell was transferred to its own subsidiary, American Telephone & Telegraph Company (AT&T Company) on the second to last day of 1899. AT&T had been incorporated on April 17, 1880, as American Bell's "long lines" division to handle its long-distance telecommunications. On January 1, 1900, AT&T, a publicly traded corporation, owned the major assets of American Bell and thus became the head of the Bell System. By December 31, 1900, it had 569,901 shares of stock outstanding, which rose to 18,662,275 shares at the close of 1935.

== Early promotional success ==
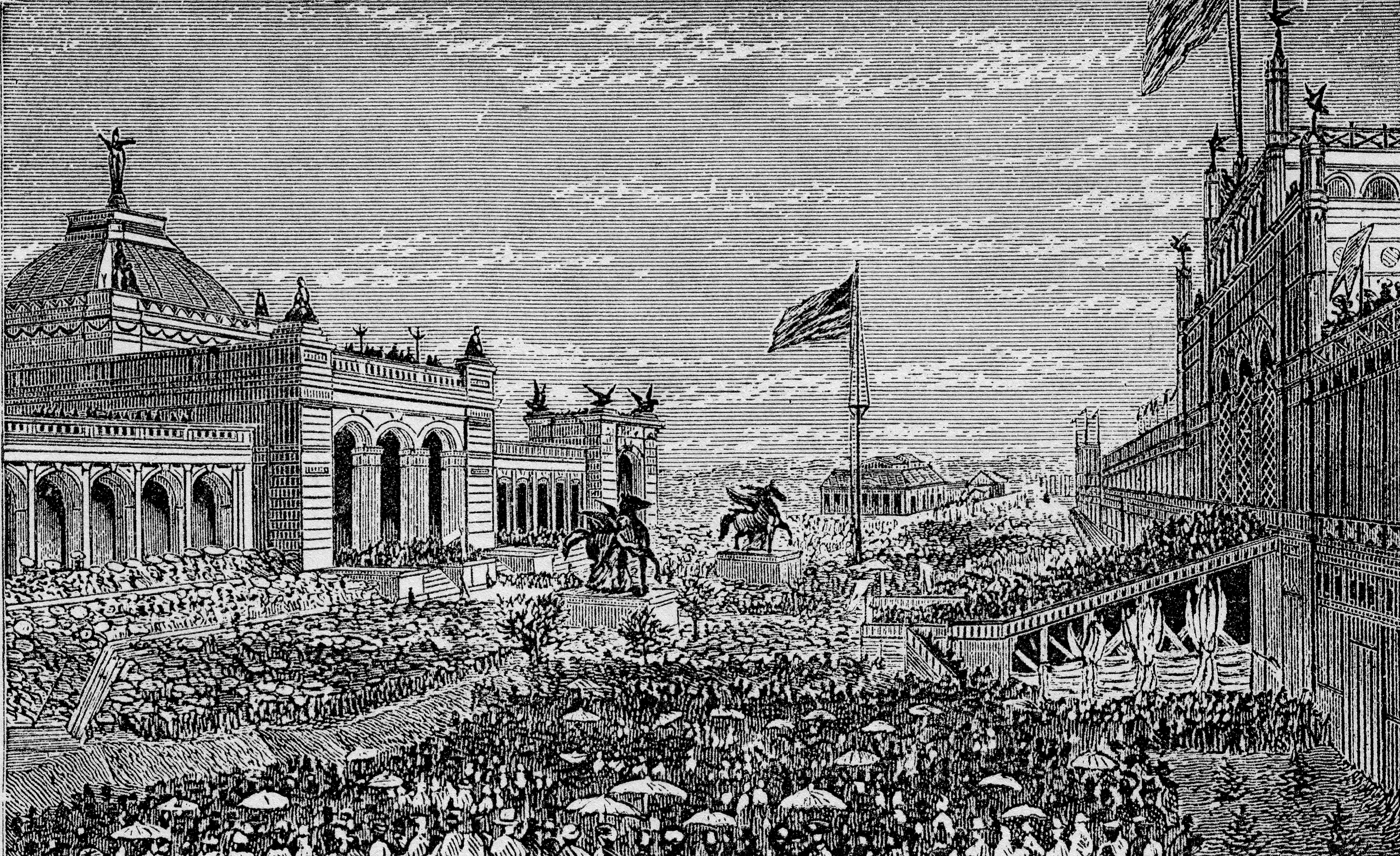
The Centennial Exhibition in Philadelphia, 1876, brought Bell international attention.

Alexander Graham Bell's fiancée Mabel Hubbard was the indirect source of the Bell Telephone Company's early commercial success after his creation of the telephone. The U.S. Centennial Exposition in Philadelphia in 1876 brought Bell's newly invented telephone international attention. Exhibition judges Emperor Dom Pedro II of the Empire of Brazil and the eminent British physicist William Thomson (Lord Kelvin) recommended his device to the Committee of Electrical Awards, which voted Bell the gold medal for Electrical Equipment, helping to propel him to international fame. Bell also won a second gold medal for his additional display at the exposition, Visible Speech —developed earlier by his equally famous father Alexander Melville Bell.

Pivotally, late in the evening moments after the main group of tired judges and newspaper reporters had quickly looked over and derided Bell's telephone display, Emperor Dom Pedro, who was straggling, entered the fair's Education Building where Bell's two displays were located. As the main group started moving on to the next exhibit to be reviewed, Dom Pedro came upon the displays and called out to Bell in his booming voice: "What are you doing here?" The emperor had met Bell before in Boston while visiting schools for the deaf in the United States.

"....it was around seven o'clock when the 50-person delegation of judges, scientists, reporters and other officials arrived at the Department of Education. Tired and hungry, they hardly looked at the telephone, made some jokes at Bell's expense, and wanted to leave the exhibition quickly when suddenly, Dom Pedro II, Emperor of Brazil from 1840 to 1889, with his wife Empress Theresa and a bevy of courtiers, entered the room. Dom Pedro recognized Bell and exclaimed "Professor Bell, I am delighted to see you again!" The judges at once forgot their tiredness and wondered who this young inventor was who was a friend of an emperor. Dom Pedro had once visited Bell's class of deaf-mutes at Boston University and initiated the first Brazilian school for deaf-mutes in Rio de Janeiro.".... ....The judges stayed the next three hours with Bell. Bell's telephone became the star of the centennial...."

"On a hot Sunday afternoon, June 25th, Sir William Thompson (later Lord Kelvin) and many other distinguished guests inspected the exhibits. Few paid much attention to Bell, tinkering with his crude instruments. At last the party approached his booth. Among them was Dom Pedro de Alcantara, the Emperor of Brazil. He had met Bell a few weeks previously in Boston and spoke to him as an old friend." "Dom Pedro had met Alec at a school for the deaf in Boston. When the emperor greeted Alec, the judges took note. They wanted to see what the emperor's friend had invented." "The centerpiece of the emperor's trip was the Centennial Exposition in Philadelphia. There, Dom Pedro II sought out a young, relatively obscure teacher at the School of the Deaf named Alexander Graham Bell, with whom he had exchanged letters."

Startled by the emperor's enthusiastic response to Bell's telephone demonstration—during which the emperor exclaimed "My God! It talks!", the crowd of judges and press members became energized and vied to take turns communicating with Bell over his invention.

Bell, who was then a full-time teacher, had not planned to exhibit at the fair because of his heavy teaching schedule and preparation for his student's examinations. He went to Philadelphia only at the stern insistence of Mabel Hubbard, his then-fiancée and future wife and who was an expert multilingual lip reader, deaf since age five.

Mabel had understood Bell's reluctance to go to the exhibition and display his works, so she secretly bought his train ticket to Philadelphia, packed his bag, and then took the unknowing Bell to Boston's train station, where she told her shocked fiancé that he was going on a trip. When Bell started arguing, Mabel turned her sight away from him and became literally deaf to his protests.

== Worldwide expansion ==
In 1879 Gardiner Hubbard founded the International Bell Telephone Company in order to promote sales of its telephone equipment throughout Europe. During his tour of the continent, the Belgian government offered him the greatest financial incentives to establish his European subsidiary's headquarters in their country.

The International Bell Telephone Company (IBTC) shortly evolved into a holding company for its various telephone service and production divisions, with its major manufacturing arm being the Bell Telephone Manufacturing Company (BTMC), which was founded in Antwerp, Belgium, on 26 April 1882. BTMC was created as a joint venture by the International Bell Telephone Company of New York and the Western Electric Company of Chicago, Illinois. BTMC then established la Compagnie Belge du Téléphone Bell (Bell Telephone Company of Belgium) in the same year as its Belgian operating subsidiary for telephone service, one of several companies that provided such service in the country, the others having evolved principally from telegraph carriers.

BTMC eventually came under complete ownership by Western Electric, and also established other divisions as national companies across Continental Europe and Russia. Western Electric was itself later majority owned by the American Bell Telephone Company, returning indirect control of BTMC back to the Bell organization.

=== Divestiture of most international divisions ===
At the close of 1899, the American Bell Telephone Company was acquired, for business purposes, by its own subsidiary, the American Telephone & Telegraph Company (AT&T), which then became the head of the monolithic and monopolistic Bell System.

Significant criticism of AT&T (a monopoly) had risen in the United States that domestic telephone system rates were higher than they needed to be, and that AT&T was using those revenues to subsidize its European operations. Due to that reason and others, and also due to the U.S. Government's regulatory intervention, AT&T president Walter Gifford divested almost all of its international interests in 1925, with the exceptions of the Bell Telephone Company of Canada (now called Bell Canada), and Northern Electric (now called Nortel).

In 1925, the European division and its subsidiaries were sold to the International Telephone & Telegraph Company (IT&T, unaffiliated with AT&T) of Cuba, at the start of that company's meteoric rise in the international telecommunications industry.

== Acquisition by AT&T ==
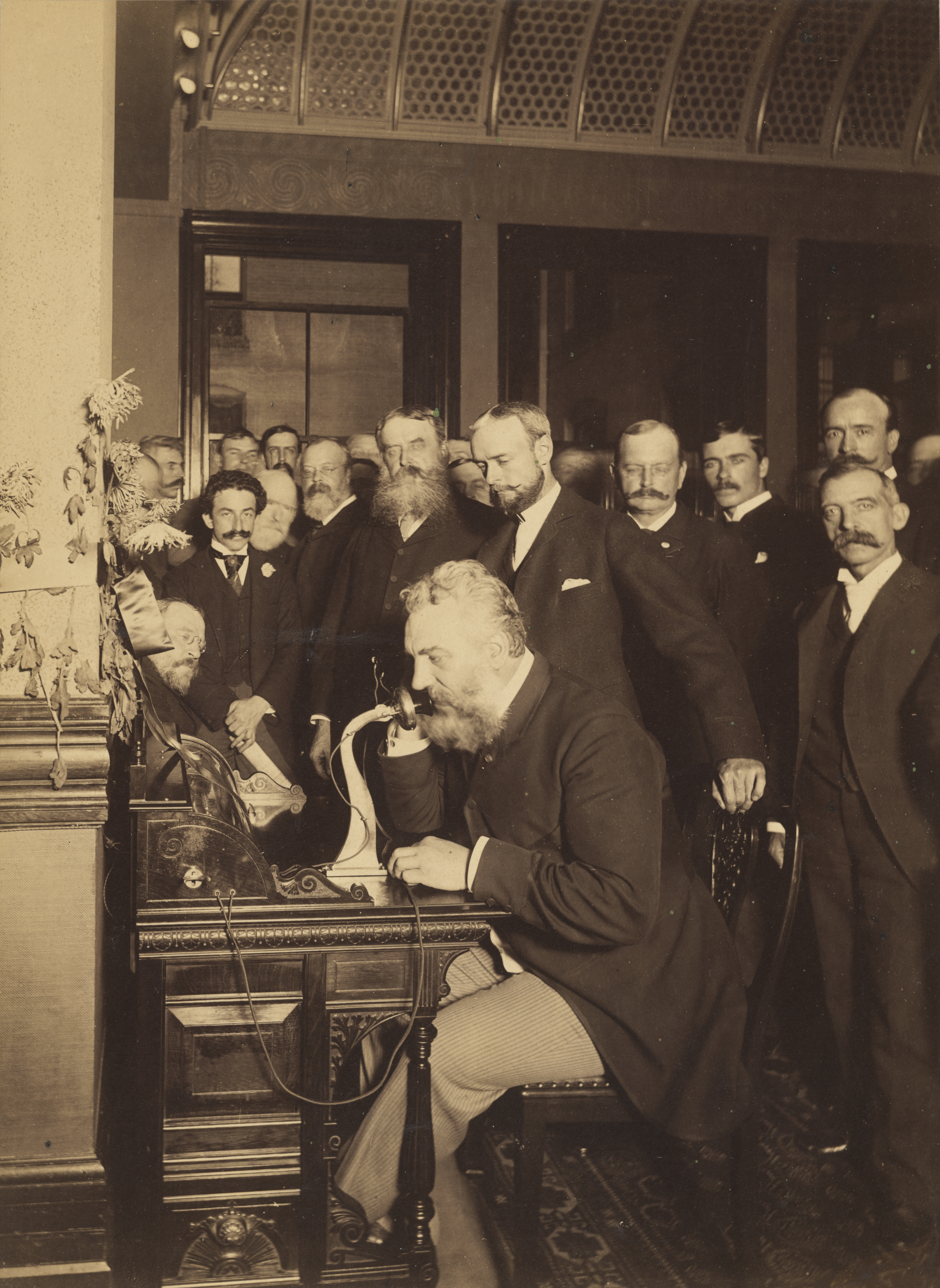
Alexander Graham Bell ceremonially inaugurating the first New York-to-Chicago telephone line in 1892

By 1881, American Bell had acquired a controlling interest in the Western Electric Company from Western Union. Only three years earlier, Western Union had turned down Gardiner Hubbard's offer to sell it all rights to the telephone for US$100,000 (approximately $3.34 million in current dollars). In only a few years, Western Union's president would acknowledge that it was a serious business error, one that later nearly led to his company being swallowed up by the newly emerging telecommunications giant into which Bell Telephone would shortly evolve. Western Union was saved from demise only by the U.S. Government's anti-monopoly interventions.

A year earlier in 1880 the management of American Bell had created what would become AT&T Long Lines. The project was the first of its kind to create a nationwide long-distance network with a commercially viable cost-structure. The project was incorporated in New York State as a separate company named American Telephone and Telegraph Company on March 3, 1885. Starting from New York City, its long-distance telephone network reached Chicago, Illinois, in 1892, with its multitudes of local exchanges continuing to stretch further and further yearly, eventually creating a continent-wide telephone system.

On December 30, 1899, the assets of American Bell were transferred into its subsidiary American Telephone and Telegraph Company (formerly only the long lines company); this was because Massachusetts corporate laws were very restrictive, and limited capitalization to $10 million, forestalling American Bell's further growth. With this assets transfer on December 30, 1899, AT&T became the parent of both American Bell and the Bell System.

John Elbridge Hudson joined Bell Telephone as counsel in 1880 and served as president from 1889 to 1900.

== Memorials to Bell's invention ==
In 1906 the citizens of the City of Brantford, Ontario, Canada and its surrounding area formed the Bell Memorial Association to commemorate the invention of the telephone by Alexander Graham Bell in July 1874 at his parents' home, Melville House, near Brantford. Walter Allward's design was the unanimous choice from among 10 submitted models, winning the competition. The memorial was planned to be completed by 1912 but Allward did not finish it until five years later. The Governor General of Canada, Victor Cavendish, 9th Duke of Devonshire, ceremoniously unveiled the memorial on 24 October 1917.

Allward designed the monument to symbolize the telephone's ability to overcome distances. A series of steps lead to the main section where the allegorical figures of Inspiration appears over a reclining male figure representing Man, the inventor, and also pointing to the floating figures of Knowledge, Joy, and Sorrow, positioned at the other end of the tableau. At each end of the memorial there are two female figures mounted on granite pedestals representing Humanity, one sending and the other receiving a message.

The Bell Telephone Memorial's grandeur has been described as the finest example of Allward's early work, propelling the sculptor to fame. The memorial itself has been used as a central fixture for many civic events and remains an important part of Brantford's history, helping the city of Brantford to style itself as 'The Telephone City'.

The Bell Memorial Association also purchased the Bell family's former farmhouse, Melville House, and its orchard at Tutela Heights, opening it as a museum to the family and to the invention of the telephone. In 1996, it was declared a historic landmark, and is now known as the Bell Homestead National Historic Site.

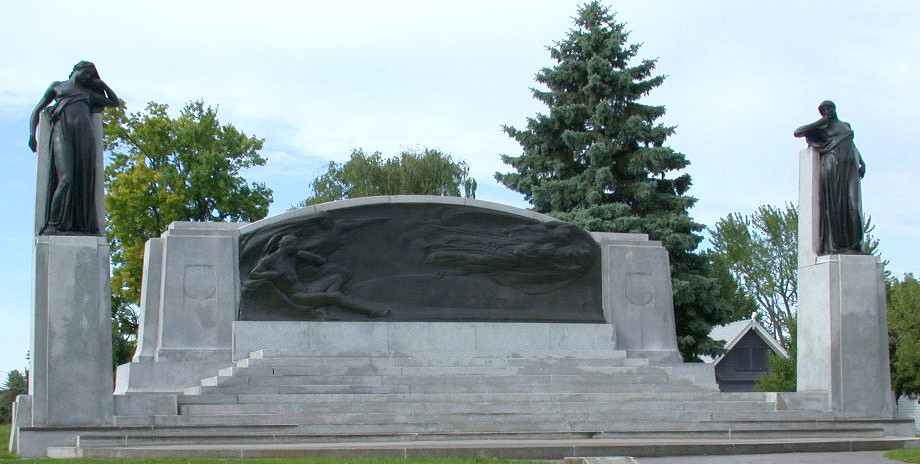
The Bell Telephone Memorial, commemorating the invention of the telephone by Alexander Graham Bell. The monument, paid by public subscription and sculpted by W.S. Allward, was dedicated by the Governor General of Canada, Victor Cavendish, 9th Duke of Devonshire with Dr. Bell in The Telephone City's Alexander Graham Bell Gardens in 1917.

== See also ==
- Bell Telephone Company of Canada
- The Telephone Cases
