= AT&T Corporation =

American telecommunications company (1885–2024)

- 1983–2003 AT&T logo

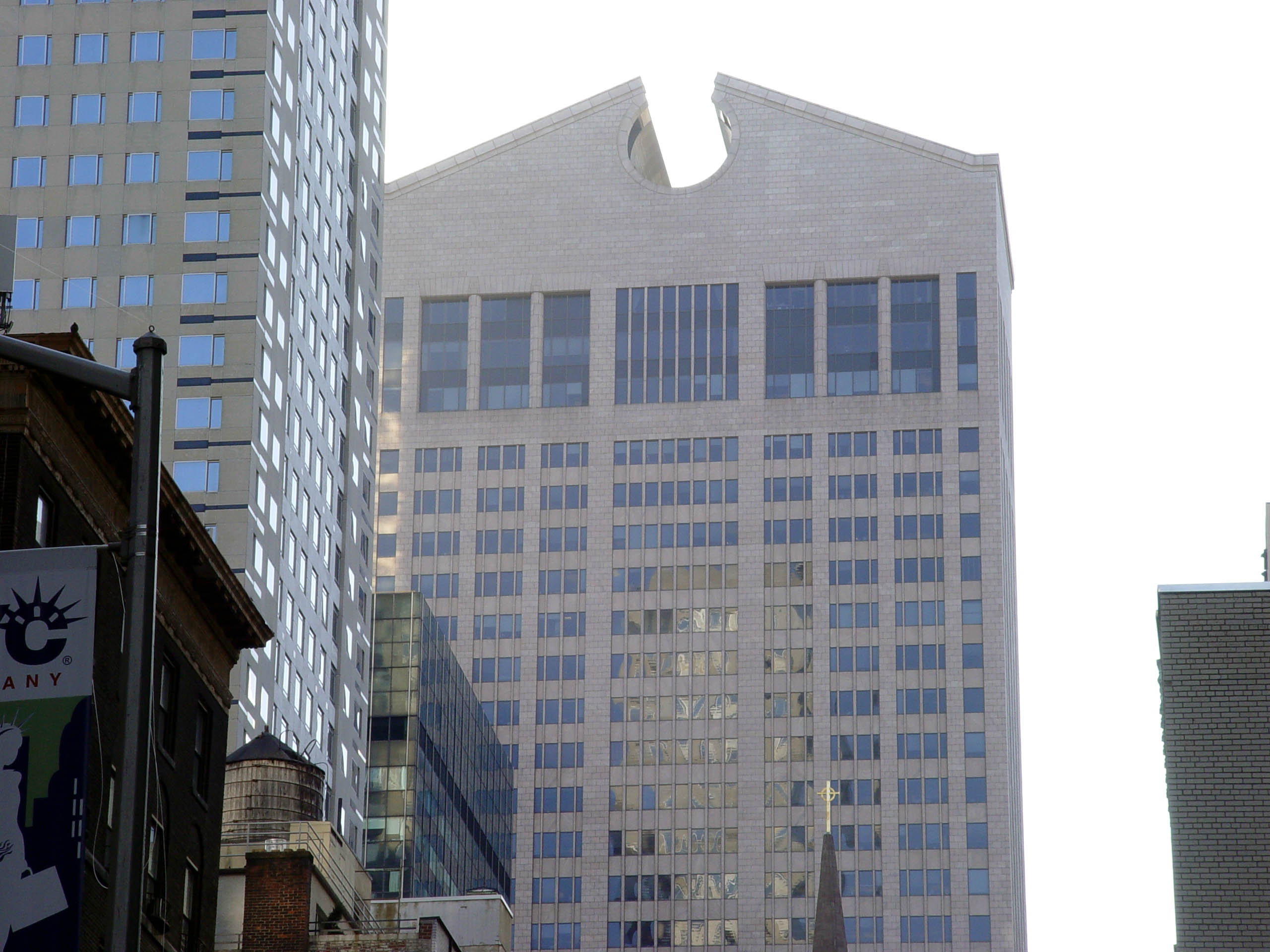
- AT&T Corporation's former headquarters at 550 Madison Avenue in New York City
- Formerly: American Telephone and Telegraph Company (1885–1994)
- Type: Subsidiary
- Traded as: NYSE: T S&P 100 component (until 2024); S&P 500 component (until 2024); DJIA component (until 2015)
- Industry: Telecommunications
- Predecessor: American Bell
- Founded: March 3, 1885; 141 years ago New York City, United States
- Founder: Theodore Newton Vail
- Defunct: May 1, 2024; 2 years ago
- Fate: Merged
- Successor: AT&T Inc.
- Headquarters: Bedminster, New Jersey, United States
- Area served: United States
- Products: Telephone services; Long-distance calling; Internet services
- Parent: American Bell (1885–1899); AT&T (2005–2024)
- Subsidiaries: AT&T Communications

AT&T Corporation, an abbreviation of its former name, the American Telephone and Telegraph Company, was an American telecommunications company that provided voice, video, data, and Internet telecommunications and professional services to businesses, consumers, and government agencies.

During the Bell System, AT&T was at times the world's largest telecommunications company, the world's largest cable television operator, and a regulated monopoly. At its peak in the 1950s and 1960s, it employed one million people and its revenue ranged between US$3 billion in 1950 ($43.6 billion in present-day terms) and $12 billion in 1966 ($123 billion in present-day terms).

In 2005, AT&T was acquired by "Baby Bell" and former subsidiary SBC Communications for more than $16 billion ($26.4 billion in present-day terms). SBC then changed its name to AT&T Inc., with AT&T Corporation continuing to exist as a long-distance calling subsidiary until its dissolution on May 1, 2024.

== History ==
Evolution of AT&T
- 1885: The American Bell company established the original iteration of AT&T to develop and operate the first long-distanced telephone network in the United States
- 1899: With the emergence of thousands of independent telephone companies, American Bell oversaw the transfer of its businesses to its subsidiary, AT&T
- 1901: AT&T underwent an initial public offering on the New York Stock Exchange, and embarked on a years-long acquisition spree to expand its telephone network
- 1907: Investors led by J.P. Morgan gained control over an indebted AT&T, and they appointed Theodore Vail as CEO to carry out goals for a telephone monopoly
- 1911: Morgan's financial backing allowed AT&T to buy hundreds of telephone companies and merge them into local operators, helping form the basis of the Bell System
- 1913: The Kingsbury Commitment enforced new regulations on AT&T by requiring its long-distance network to interconnect and secure approval for any acquisition
- 1918: A one-year wartime measure done by the U.S. Government briefly nationalized the telecom sector in the United States and placed it under the management of AT&T
- 1922: Even after the wartime measure ended, AT&T's competition had effectively been eliminated, and the Willis Graham Act helped solidify it as a monopoly
- 1925: Bell Laboratories was founded as AT&T's research and development division, and it would oversee numerous inventions that contributed to modern technology
- 1930: AT&T entered the 1930s as the world's largest company by total asset valuation and remained one of the most profitable corporations for the next several decades
- 1947: Researchers at Bell Labs developed the Transistor, and by the 1950s, it became a revolutionary due to its efficiency
- 1956: A consent decree between AT&T and the U.S. Department of Justice restricted the company to its native field of telephony
- 1974: After many unsuccessful lawsuits, the Justice Department sued AT&T in an antitrust lawsuit and sought to dismantle the Bell System piece by piece
- 1983: AT&T settled in 1982 and prepared for the Bell System breakup. Bell Labs assumed Western Electric's assets and was placed under AT&T Technologies
- 1984: Once the Bell System ended and became seven regional companies, AT&T entered into computing
- 1996: In preparation for relaxed regulations, AT&T separated NCR Corporation and Lucent Technologies into public companies and formed AT&T Labs
- 1999: Southwestern Bell grew throughout the late 1990s by acquiring Pacific Telesis and Ameritech while AT&T became the largest American cable operator
- 2002: Due to mounting debt, AT&T separated its cable and wireless divisions, and those companies were acquired by Comcast and Cingular Wireless
- 2005: Southwestern Bell acquired AT&T Corporation and adopted its branding as the modern iteration of AT&T
- 2007: Shortly after acquiring BellSouth, AT&T rebranded Cingular as AT&T Mobility and secured a four-year exclusivity contract with the newly released iPhone
- 2011: AT&T attempted to acquire T-Mobile US from Deutsche Telekom, but after the deal faced a lawsuit from regulators, the merger was eventually cancelled
- 2015: DirecTV was acquired and brought under AT&T Communications, while AT&T expanded its presence in Mexico
- 2018: Wanting to achieve vertical integration, AT&T bought out Time Warner and rebranded it as WarnerMedia
- 2020: HBO Max was released by WarnerMedia as the company's core streaming service to combat cord-cutting in pay televison
- 2022: AT&T and Discovery, Inc. conducted a Reverse Morris Trust and merged WarnerMedia into a separate company called Warner Bros. Discovery
- 2026: AT&T acquired the fiber internet assets of Lumen Technologies and celebrated 125 years of being a publicly traded company on the New York Stock Exchange

=== Origins ===
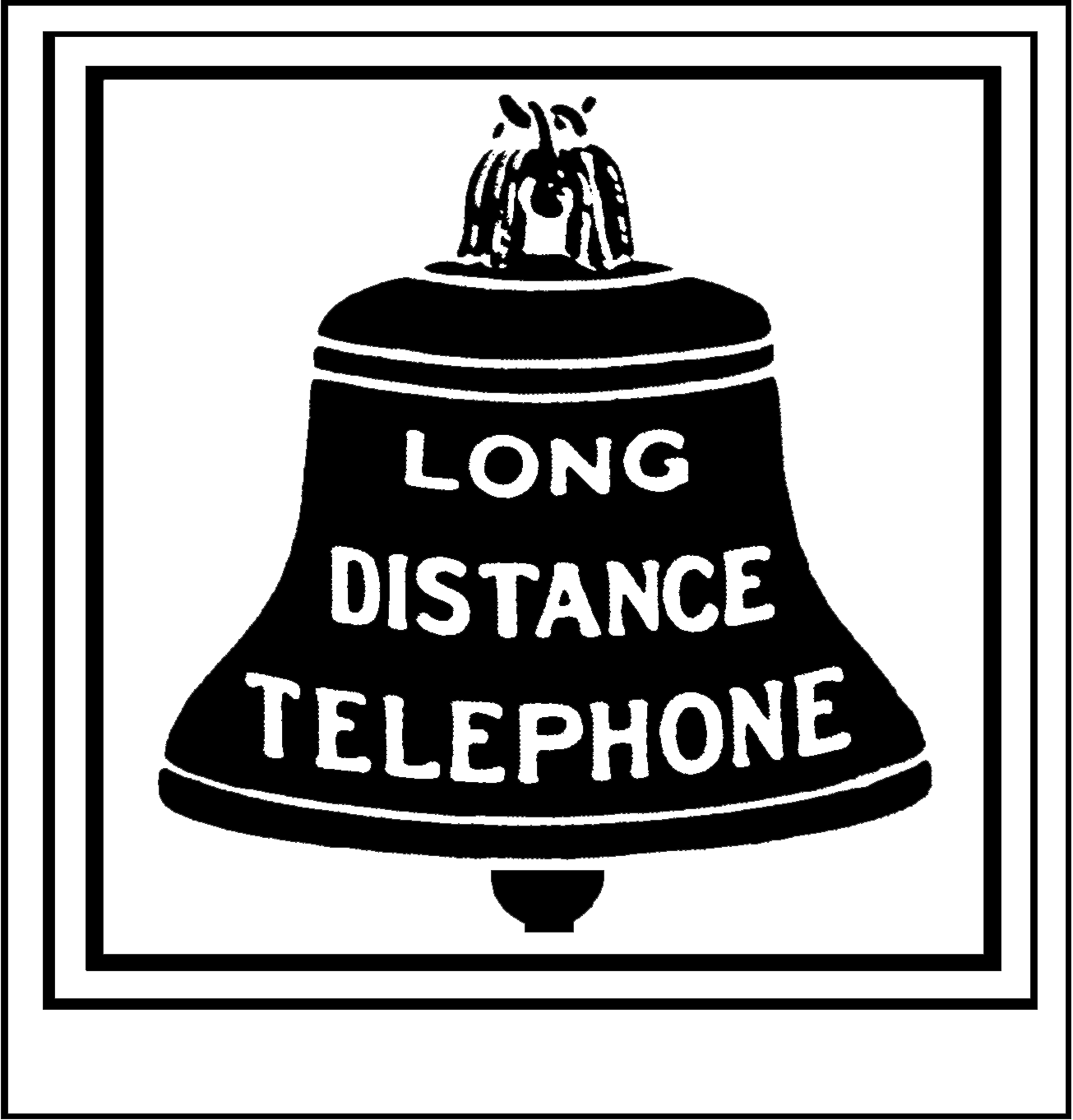
A Bell System logo (called the Blue Bell) used from 1889 to 1916

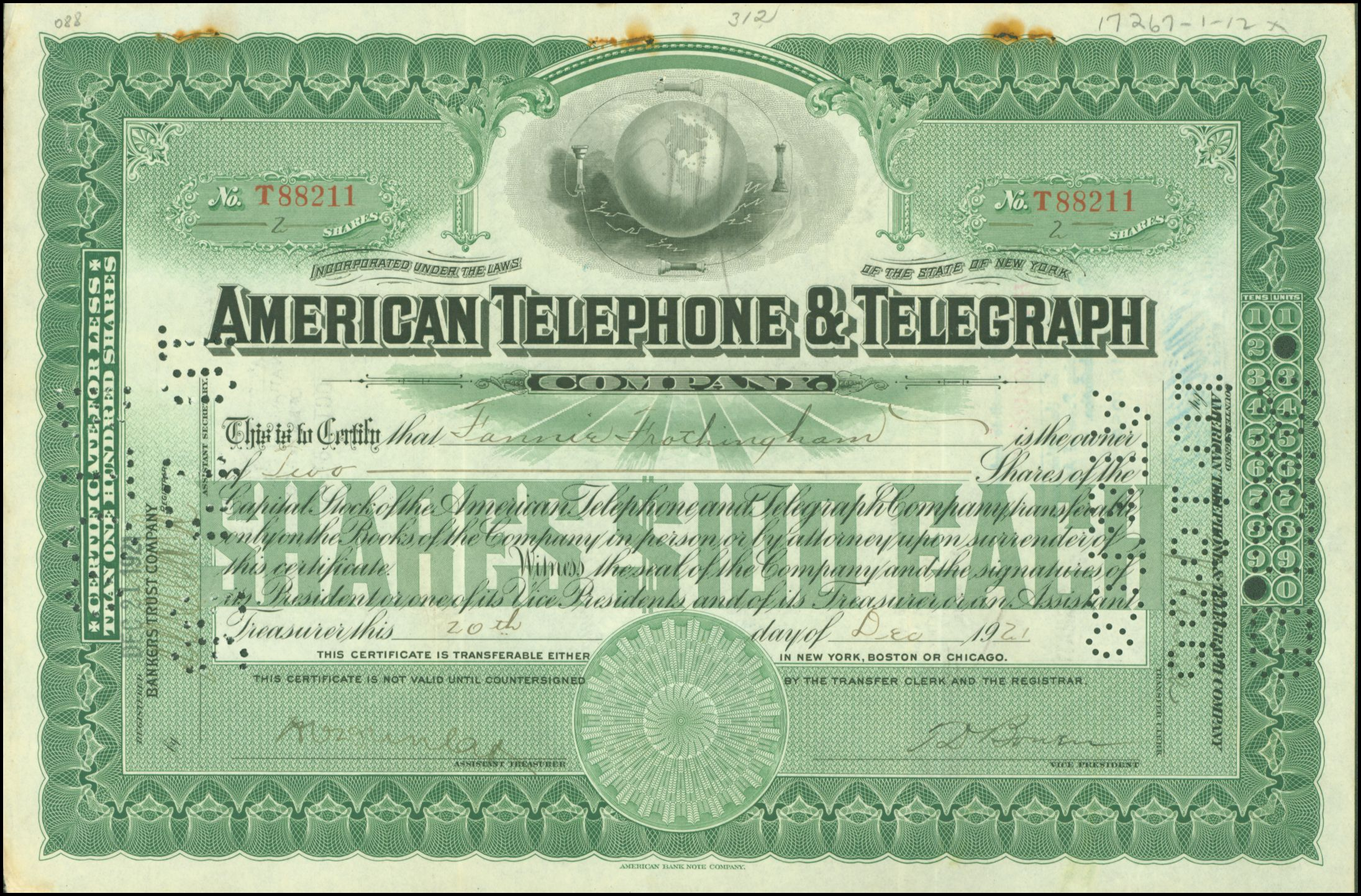
Share of the American Telephone & Telegraph Company, issued 20 December 1921

AT&T started with Bell Patent Association, a legal entity established in 1874 to protect the patent rights of Alexander Graham Bell after he invented the telephone system. Originally a verbal agreement, it was formalized in writing in 1875 as Bell Telephone Company.

In 1880 the management of American Bell created what would become AT&T Long Lines. The project was the first of its kind to create a nationwide long-distance network with a commercially viable cost-structure. The project was formally incorporated in New York as a separate company named American Telephone and Telegraph Company on March 3, 1885. Originating in New York City, its long-distance telephone network reached Chicago, Illinois, in 1892, with its multitudes of local exchanges continuing to stretch further and further yearly, eventually creating a continent-wide telephone system. On December 30, 1899, the assets of American Bell were transferred into its subsidiary American Telephone and Telegraph Company (formerly AT&T Long Lines); this was because Massachusetts corporate laws were very restrictive, and limited capitalization to ten million dollars, forestalling American Bell's further growth. With this assets transfer at the very end of the 19th century, AT&T became the parent of both American Bell and the Bell System.

On April 30, 1907, Theodore Newton Vail became president of AT&T. Vail believed in the superiority of one phone system and AT&T adopted the slogan "One Policy, One System, Universal Service." This would be the company's philosophy for the next 70 years.

Under Vail, AT&T began buying up many of the smaller telephone companies including Western Union telegraph. These actions brought unwanted attention from antitrust regulators. Anxious to avoid action from government antitrust suits, AT&T and the federal government entered into an agreement known as the Kingsbury Commitment. In the Kingsbury Commitment, AT&T and the government reached an agreement that allowed AT&T to continue operating as a telephone monopoly, subject to certain conditions, including divesting its interest in Western Union. While AT&T periodically faced scrutiny from regulators, this state of affairs continued until the company's breakup in 1984. Throughout most of the 20th century, AT&T held a semi-monopoly on phone service in the United States and Canada through a network of companies called the Bell System. At this time, the company was nicknamed Ma Bell.

=== Early radio development ===
AT&T closely monitored new telephony technologies, although initially for private communication. In 1906, it sent observers to Reginald Fessenden's radiotelephone demonstration of his alternator transmitter. Fessenden hoped that AT&T would purchase his company and patents, but the phone company concluded that Fessenden's system was not sufficiently refined.

It was not until the development of vacuum-tube transmitters that radiotelephony became practical. AT&T purchased the commercial rights to Lee de Forest's vacuum-tube and radio patents. Although originally the company developed vacuum-tubes for distant land-line amplification, in 1915 the company conducted radiotelephony tests from station NAA in Arlington, Virginia, which established impressive new audio distance records, heard as far west as Hawaii, and east to Paris, France, which was the first documented transmission of speech across the Atlantic Ocean.

In 1919, the Radio Corporation of America (RCA) was formed, from the assets of the American subsidiary of the Marconi Company. A series of patent cross-licensing agreements were made, including, effective July 1, 1920, one between RCA's founders and AT&T, which granted AT&T exclusive rights within the United States for "Public Service Telephony". In 1920, a telephone link using radio transmissions was established between Avalon Island, California and the mainland, although this was later replaced by an underwater cable, because local amateurs began to amuse themselves by listening-in to private conversations.

It was recognized that a potential use of unrestricted radio transmissions was broadcasting to a widespread audience. In a 1919 presentation at the Convention of the American Institute of Electrical Engineers, two company engineers noted the possibility for "the broadcasting of news, time and weather signals, and warning. In some cases one objection to radio-telephony would be an advantage in this class of service." The Westinghouse Electric and Manufacturing Company later purchased the successor company to Fessenden's early work. Employing vacuum-tube transmitters, it inaugurated well-financed radio broadcasting stations, starting in November 1920 with KDKA, located at its East Pittsburgh, Pennsylvania headquarters, and soon many additional stations began operating.

In December 1921, AT&T longline engineers John F. Bratney and Harley C. Lauderback prepared a memo reviewing AT&T's radio broadcasting options. They stated that commercial broadcasting was a significant opportunity, and proposed the nationwide establishment of 38 stations, linked together by long-distance telephone lines, that could be hired out (known, using telephone terminology, as "toll stations").

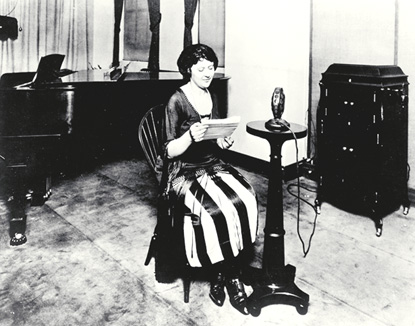
Helen Hann, broadcasting at WEAF in 1922

Radio broadcasting in the United States dramatically expanded in 1922, with over 500 stations by the end of the year. Thus, AT&T ended up establishing only two stations: WBAY (later WEAF) in New York City, and WCAP in Washington, D.C., licensed to its Chesapeake and Potomac subsidiary. WEAF was the company's showcase station. Its primary competition was RCA's WJZ, also in New York City, although, based on AT&T's interpretation of the cross-licensing agreements, WJZ was prohibited from commercial operation. Moreover, WJZ's engineer-in-charge, Carl Dreher, later admitted that "WEAF... was better on the technical end than we were... Raymond Guy... sums it up in his reminiscences... 'AT&T did things with a more thorough knowledge of what they were doing... They just knew more about telephony than we did, as you might expect. They had the best telephone engineers in the world. The entire Bell Laboratories were at their disposal.'"

AT&T initially found that, instead of hiring WEAF, most potential broadcasters wanted to establish their own stations. According to AT&T's interpretation of the RCA cross-licensing agreements, its Western Electric subsidiary had the exclusive right to manufacture and sell radio transmitters, although most early stations had built their own. In 1924, with only about 50 of the more than 500 U.S. stations having Western Electric transmitters, AT&T started to move aggressively to enforce its patent rights, and began a court case charging infringement against WHN, a New York City-area station. Although company president H. B. Thayer issued a statement that "We have no desire for a monopoly of the air", this was met with widespread skepticism, as earlier sales contracts for Western Electric transmitters had included a clause prohibiting stations "to operate for hire". This restriction on commercial programming was seen as a covert way to largely eliminate competition, as it was becoming apparent that for most stations there was no way to finance operations without selling airtime. In view of these concerns, Commerce secretary Herbert Hoover issued a statement that "neither will our public policy allow [radio broadcasting] to become monopolized".

Seeing no chance of prevailing against the AT&T suit, WHN reached an out-of-court settlement that set the standard for the radio broadcasting industry, which was reported as: "According to the stipulations of the settlement, the American Telephone and Telegraph Company released WHN from all liability for past infringement of its patents. WHN paid $2,000 for a personal, non-transferable license to do general telephonic broadcasting, including for toll or hire, for the entire term of the patents. If at any time the power of WHN should be increased, the American Telephone and Telegraph Company will grant a new license on similar terms and for a proportionally larger fee." The standard rate for a license to use AT&T's radio patents was based on a station's transmitter power, set at $4 per kilowatt, although non-commercial stations were only charged $1. Even this was too much for some stations, including KFAY in Medford, Oregon, which was unable to afford a license fee of $500, as well as two Portland, Oregon stations, KGG and KFOH. However, despite earlier concerns, the agreement allowed stations to begin commercial operation.

Meanwhile, AT&T engineers worked to develop a network of radio stations, linked by specially prepared long-distance telephone lines. The first permanent link, originating at WEAF, was established in the summer of 1923, to station WMAF in South Dartmouth, Massachusetts. As it expanded, this network became known as the "WEAF chain".

==== Broadcasting Company of America subsidiary ====
On May 11, 1926, AT&T announced a major reorganization, that "The radio broadcasting activities heretofore carried on by the radio broadcasting department of the American Telephone and Telegraph Company, under the general designation of WEAF, will be incorporated under the name Broadcasting Company of America." (BCA) Operations continued to be based at AT&T headquarters at 195 Broadway in New York City. AT&T's BCA consolidation allowed for two possible outcomes: if AT&T decided to withdraw from broadcasting, then the transfer of its radio operations would be simplified, otherwise, the new entity could continue to be run semi-independently of the parent corporation.

During BCA's short existence, the standard WEAF chain consisted of a network of 17 stations, concentrated in the northeastern United States, but also extended westward to WDAF in Kansas City, Missouri. Individual evening hourly station rates ranged from $170 for three stations located in smaller communities to $480 for flagship WEAF. The standard charge for an hour of evening programming over the entire roster of stations was $4,080, before any applicable discounts.

Unpublicized when the BCA subsidiary was established were ongoing intense negotiations between AT&T and the "radio group" companies, led by RCA, about the status of the cross-licensing agreements, and the overall future of the broadcasting industry. On July 21, AT&T issued a press release announcing BCA's sale to RCA for $1,000,000, which in turn used these assets to form the National Broadcasting Company. This memo stated that although operation of WEAF and the WEAF chain had been financially successful, it had been concluded that "while the technical principle was similar to that of the telephone system, the objective of the broadcasting station was quite different from that of a telephone system. Consequently, it has seemed to us after years of experimentation, that the broadcasting station which we have built up might be more suitably operated by other interests." Although it was ending its direct involvement in radio broadcasting, AT&T continued the very profitable leasing of long-distance telephone lines, to link together radio network affiliates.

=== Undersea communications and operations ===
AT&T had a domestic and global presence in laying the infrastructure of undersea routes for telecommunications. In 1950, the U.S. Navy commissioned a network of undersea surveillance cables for foreign submarine detection. AT&T was probably, according to internal employees, involved in this Sound Surveillance System (SOSUS). After completion, AT&T began commercial operations in cable laying for communications in 1955. The implementation of cables assured local and long-distance telephone or data services would provide revenue for the company. AT&T Long Lines was one of the divisions responsible for the cable-laying and maintaining of Long Lines' undersea cables. Western Electric was the manufacturing company responsible for production and supply of undersea coaxial equipment and later, fiber cables. Equipment such as repeaters was manufactured in Clark, New Jersey and coaxial cable was manufactured in Baltimore, Maryland . Also, Bell Labs was responsible for the innovations of products or technologies in cabling in transmission by undersea systems. In 1955, the first trans-Atlantic telephone undersea cable, TAT-1, from North America to Europe was installed by AT&T. This installation allowed 48 telephone circuits to be used for long-distance calling. When partnering with other global Telecommunications companies, such as the French Cables de Lyon and German Felten & Guilleaume, Bell Labs provided the specification and inspection of non Bell System cable for networks such as the TAT-2. By the continuous undersea network installations, AT&T was a globally technology leader with the 1970 installed TAT-5 and the 1975 installed TAT-6, achieving 720 channels and then 4000 channels for transmitting voice or data. Prior to 1963, AT&T had to charter oceanic ships, such as the CS Monarch (1945) for installations. AT&T purchased CS Long Lines in 1961 and operated it with several cable laying ships that would provide, either the laying or repair of cabling under the subsidiary, Transoceanic Cable Ship Company. After the break-up, AT&T operated their ships under a subsidiary called AT&T Submarine Systems Inc, based in Morristown, New Jersey, until they sold six ships to Tyco International Ltd in 1997 for $850 million. AT&T continued to maintain their communication building facilities. Here is a list of the cable laying-ship fleet:

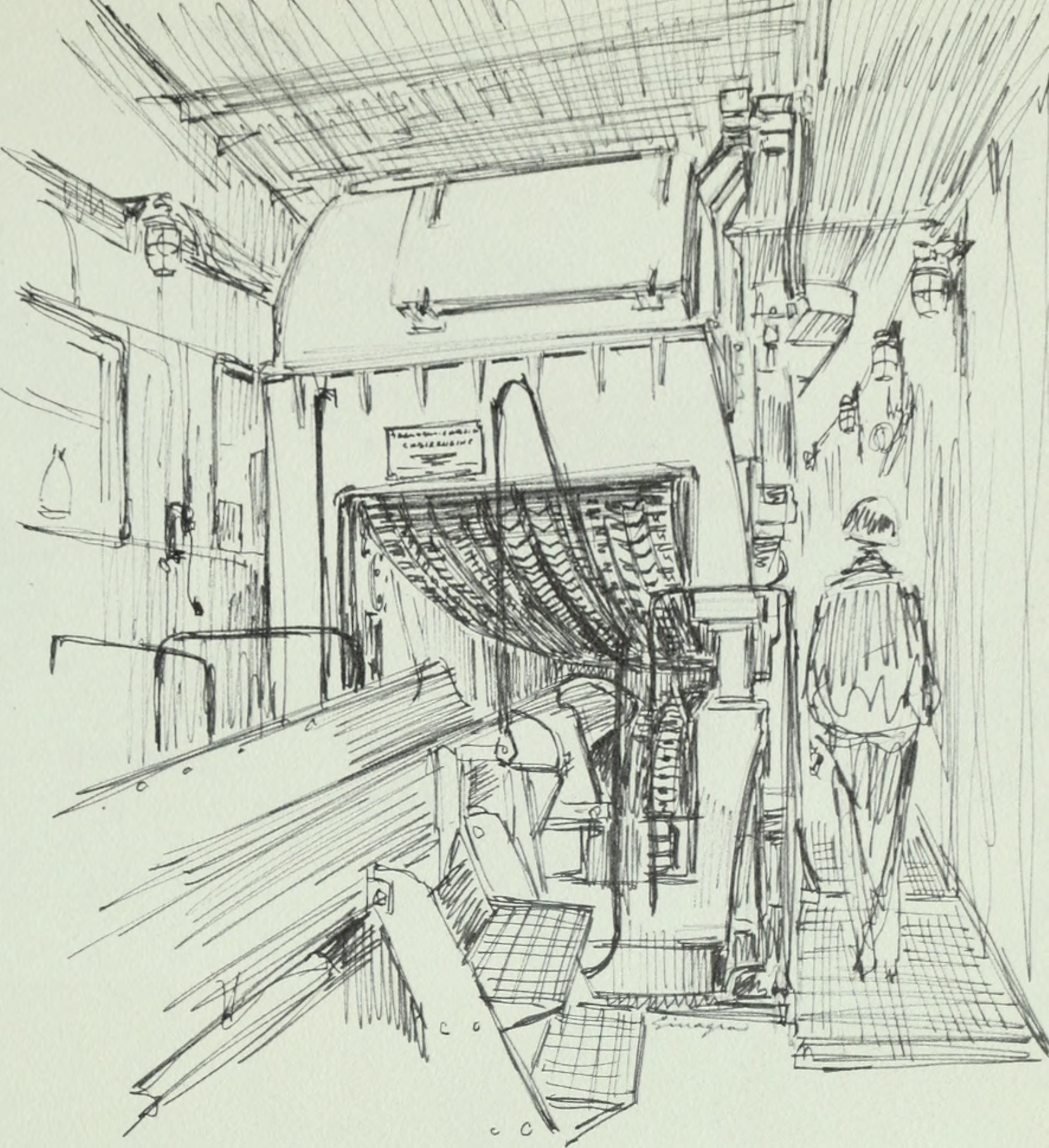
The 180,000-pound linear cable laying engine of CS Long Lines used for cable flow from storage to seabed

- CS Lidiv (Decommissioned 1955) Built for AT&T Corp. for New York Telephone Company use. Decommissioned in 1955 and the CS Cable Queen was the replacement.
- CS Cable Queen (Built 1951–1952) Built for AT&T Corp. for the Bell System usage by New York Telephone Company. A 65-foot small-scale underwater telephone cable-laying vessel. Decommissioned after 1989 with over 100,000 miles of cable laying.
- CS Salernum (Built 1954) Built in Italy and named CS Salernum. Dimensions were length as 339.6 ft, breadth as 41.0 ft, depth as 18.5 ft, and gross tonnage at 2789. Purchased by AT&T Corp. through its subsidiary, Transoceanic Cableship Co., in 1984. Sold by AT&T in 1997 to Tyco International in the AT&T Submarine Systems fleet purchases. The wreck became an article reef in the Dutch Caribbean island, Sint Eustatius.

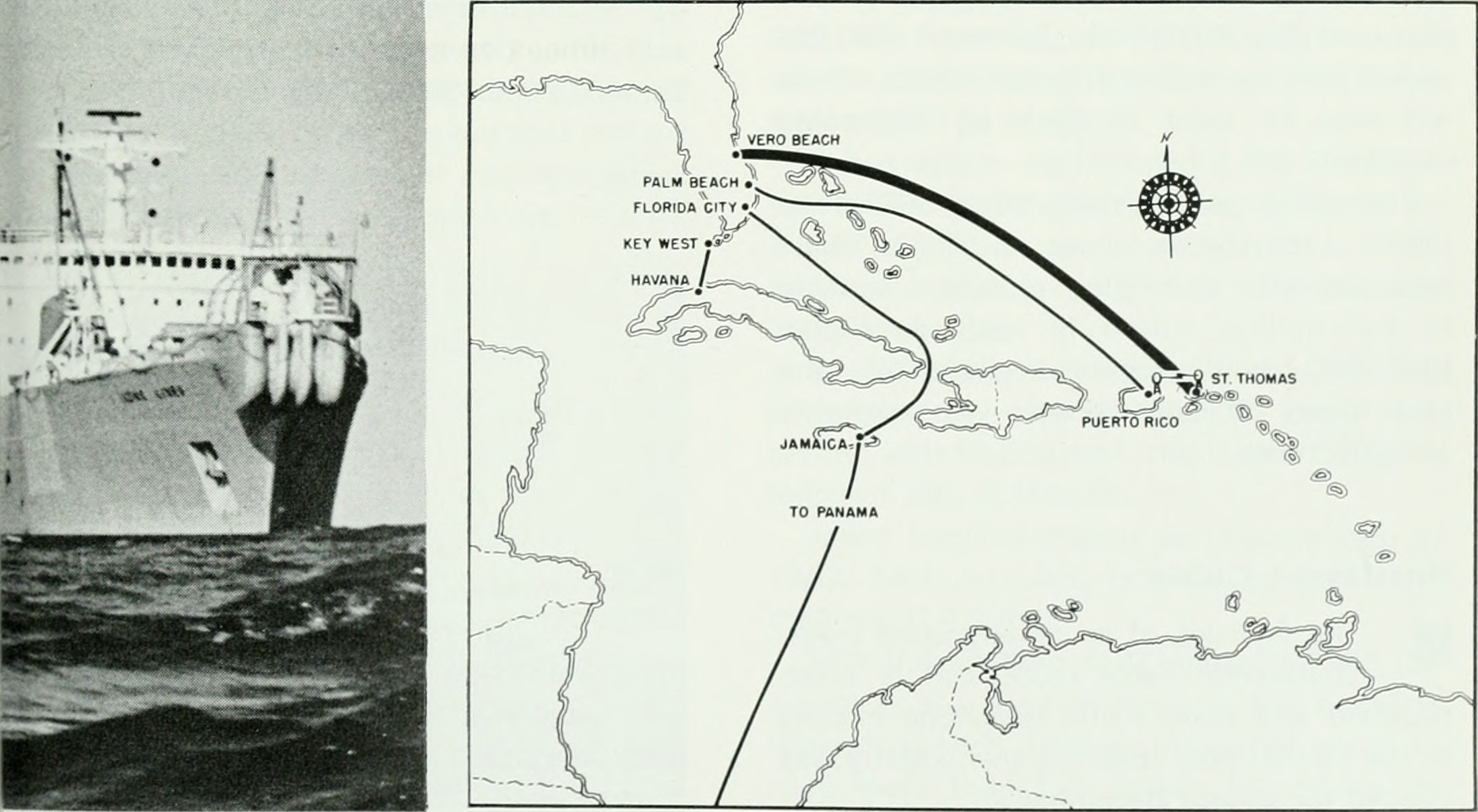
AT&T Long Lines cable ship working on the cable linking mainland Vero Beach, Florida to St. Thomas in the Virgin Islands. Typical maps, US to Venezuela cable route.

- CS Long Lines (Built 1961–1963) Built for AT&T Corp. for the 1961 launching, but cable laying assignments began in 1963. The $19 million vessel was 511 feet length and 11,300-tons. Performed the laying of the first trans-Pacific telephone cable, known as TRANSPAC-1 (TPC-1) in 1964. and the first trans-Pacific fiber cable, known as TPC 3. Sold in 1997 to Tyco International. Scrapped in 2003.
- C.S. Link (Built 1990s) Owned by Transoceanic Cable Ship Co., a subsidiary of the United States–based telephone company, AT&T Corp.
- CS Global Sentinel (Built 1992) Maiden voyage from shipyard to Honolulu was February 1992. The 479-foot vessel equipped with bow thrusters, began cable laying operations in early 1992. Owned by Transoceanic Cable Ship Co., a subsidiary of the United States telephone company, AT&T Corp.
- CS Global Mariner (Built 1992) Built in Singapore. The 479-foot vessel was equipped with bow thrusters and had storage space for up to 4100 nautical miles of cable. Seafaring was done in December 1992 by Seafarers International Union crew. A SIU publication, Seafarers Log, indicated in January 1993 the vessel was the fifth cable ship of the AT&T Corp. fleet. It was a sister ship and identical to CS Global Sentinel. Owned by Transoceanic Cable Ship Co., the subsidiary of the United States AT&T telephone company.

Between 1951 and 2000, AT&T was listed 73 times in cable laying operations for specific routes deployed. The Cable Ship Long Lines had 23 cable runs from 1963 to 1992, with the first deep-sea trial of optical fiber cable in 1982 leading to the consortium of countries and locations for the TAT-8 fiber cable implementation of 1988.

=== Break-up ===
Logo used from 1983 to 1999

Logo used since 2005

The United States Justice Department opened the case United States v. AT&T in 1974. This was prompted by suspicion that AT&T was using monopoly profits from its Western Electric subsidiary to subsidize the cost of its network, a violation of antitrust law. A settlement to this case was finalized in 1982, leading to the division of the company on January 1, 1984, into seven Regional Bell Operating Companies, commonly known as Baby Bells. These companies were:

- Ameritech, acquired by SBC in 1999, now part of AT&T Inc.
- Bell Atlantic (now Verizon Communications), which acquired GTE in 2000
- BellSouth, merged with AT&T Inc. in 2006
- NYNEX, acquired by Bell Atlantic in 1996, Bell Atlantic is now Verizon Communications
- Pacific Telesis, acquired by SBC in 1997, now part of AT&T Inc.
- Southwestern Bell (later SBC, now AT&T Inc.), which acquired AT&T Corp. in 2005
- US West, acquired by Qwest in 2000, which in turn was acquired by CenturyLink (now Lumen Technologies) in 2011. In May 2025, AT&T announced an agreement to purchase Lumen Technologies' consumer connectivity business. This deal will incorporate most of US West's residential footprint into AT&T Inc.

AT&T Corporation; RBOC grouped into "Baby Bells" split off in 1984
BellSouth	AT&T Corporation (non-LEC)	Ameritech	Pacific Telesis	Southwestern Bell (later SBC Communications)	Bell Atlantic	NYNEX	US West
GTE (non-RBOC ILEC)	Qwest (non-ILEC)
Verizon
AT&T (former SBC)
CenturyLink (non-RBOC ILEC)
AT&T	Verizon	Lumen Technologies

Post-breakup, the former parent company's main business was now AT&T Communications Inc., which focused on long-distance services, and with other non-RBOC activities.

AT&T acquired NCR Corporation in 1991. AT&T announced in 1995 that it would split into three companies: a manufacturing/R&D company, a computer company, and a services company. NCR, Bell Labs and AT&T Technologies were to be spun off by 1997. In preparation for its spin-off, AT&T Technologies was now Lucent Technologies. Lucent was completely spun off from AT&T in 1996.

=== Acquisition by SBC ===
On January 31, 2005, the "Baby Bell" company SBC Communications announced its plans to acquire "Ma Bell" AT&T Corp. for $16 billion. SBC announced in October 2005 that it would shed the "SBC" brand and take the more recognizable AT&T brand, along with the old AT&T's "T" NYSE ticker symbol.

Merger approval concluded on November 18, 2005; SBC Communications began rebranding the following Monday, November 21 as "the new AT&T" and began trading under the "T" symbol on December 1. Present-day AT&T Inc. claims AT&T Corp.'s history as its own, but retains SBC's pre-2005 stock price history and corporate structure. As well, all SEC filings before 2005 are under SBC, not AT&T.

=== The AT&T headquarters buildings ===
From 1885 to 1910, AT&T was headquartered at 125 Milk Street in Boston. With its expansion it moved to New York City, to a headquarters on 195 Broadway (close to what is now the World Trade Center site). The property originally belonged to Western Union, of which AT&T held a controlling interest until 1913 when AT&T divested its interest as part of the Kingsbury Commitment. Construction of the current building began in 1912. Designed by William Welles Bosworth, who played a significant role in designing Kykuit, the Rockefeller mansion north of Tarrytown, New York, it was a modern steel structure clad top to bottom in a Greek-styled exterior, the three-story-high Ionic columns of Vermont granite forming eight registers over a Doric base. The lobby of the AT&T Building was one of the most unusual ones of the era. Instead of a large double-high space, similar to the nearby Woolworth Building, Bosworth designed what is called a "hypostyle hall", with full-bodied Doric columns modeled on the Parthenon, marking out a grid. Bosworth was seeking to coordinate the classical tradition with the requirements of a modern building. Columns were not merely the decorative elements they had become in the hands of other architects but created all the illusion of being real supports. Bosworth also designed the campus of MIT as well as Theodore N. Vail's mansion in Morristown, New Jersey.

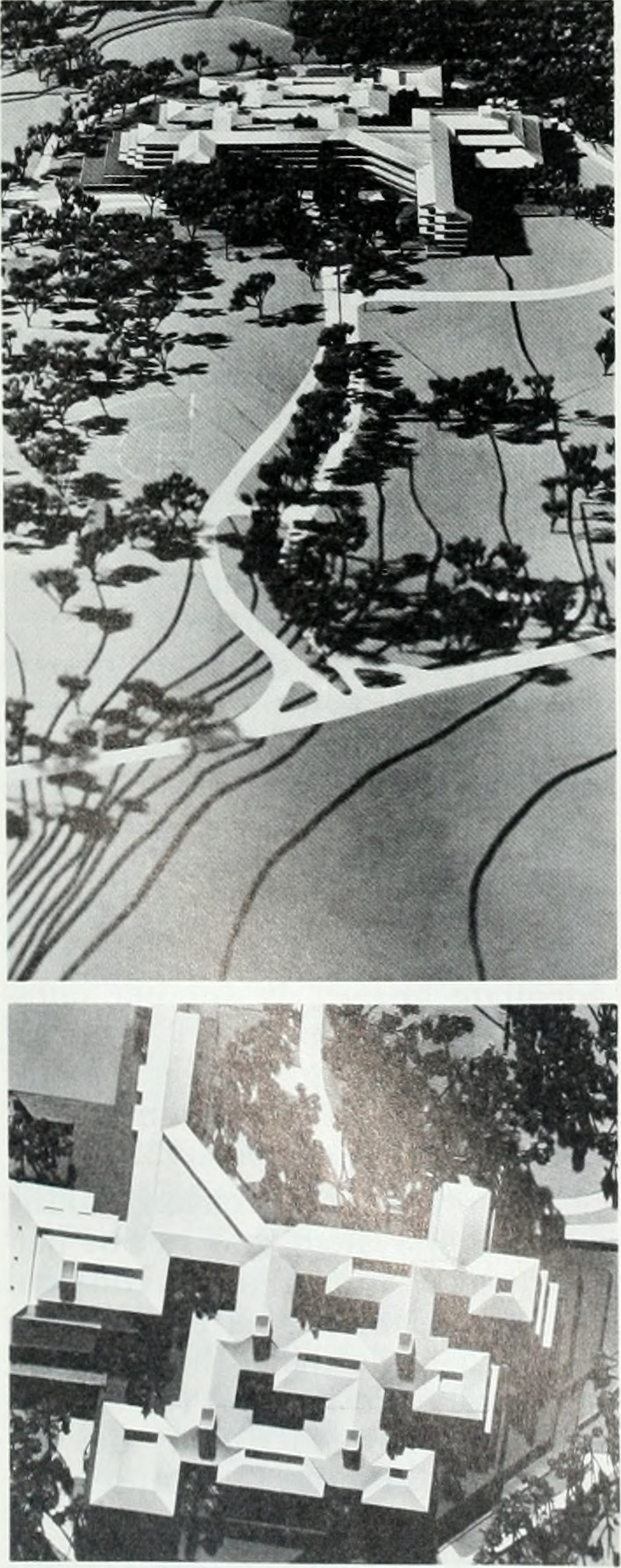
AT&T Basking Ridge "Pagoda" campus renditions for office complex, 1972

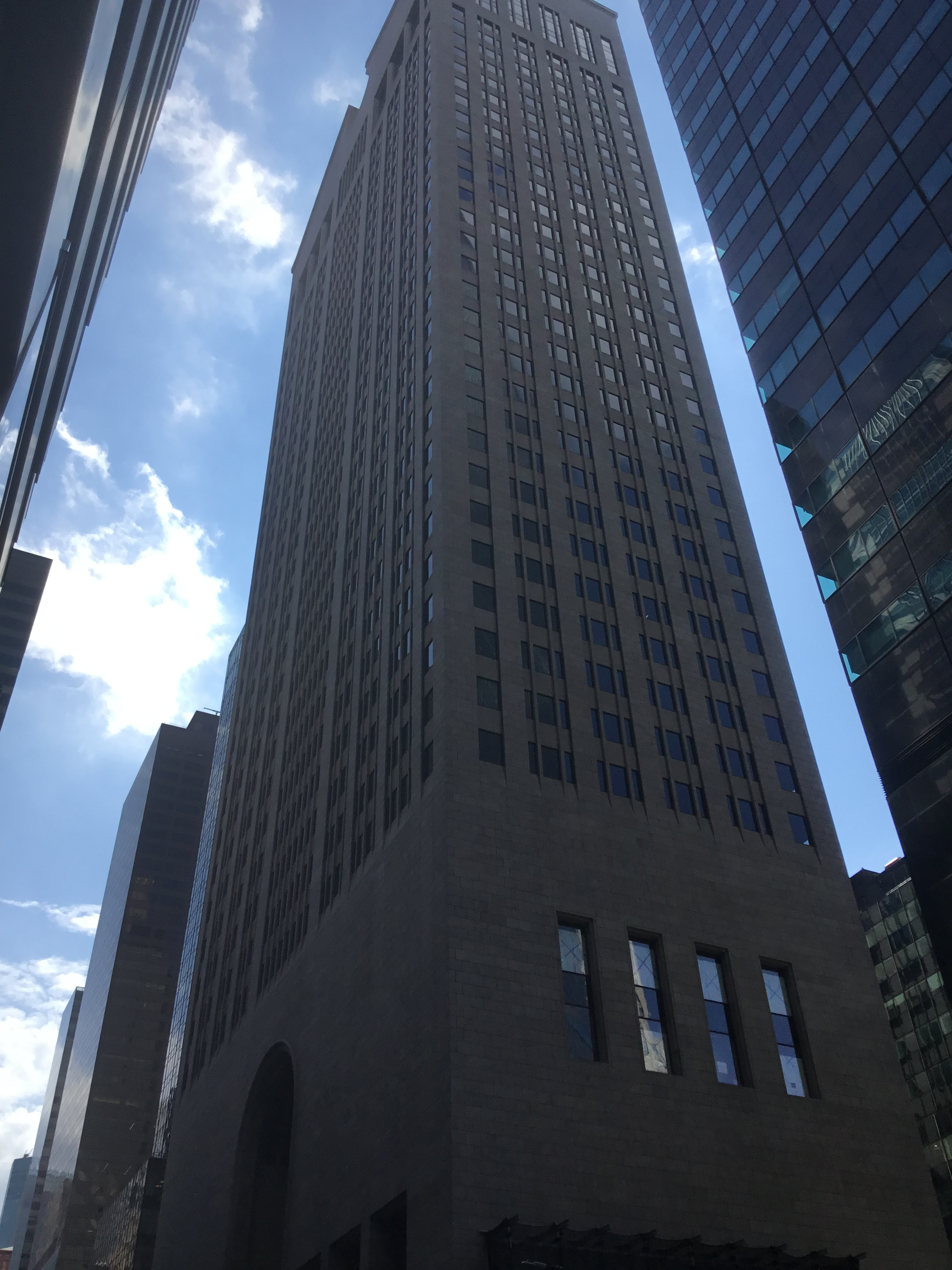
AT&T 550 Madison Ave building, no longer corporate headquarters after 1992 (pictured 2021)

In 1978, AT&T commissioned a new building at 550 Madison Avenue. This new AT&T Building was designed by Philip Johnson and quickly became an icon of the new Postmodern architectural style. The building was completed in 1984, the very year of the divestiture of the Bell System. The building proved to be too large for the post-divestiture corporation and in 1993, AT&T leased the building to Sony, who then subsequently owned the building until it was sold in 2013.

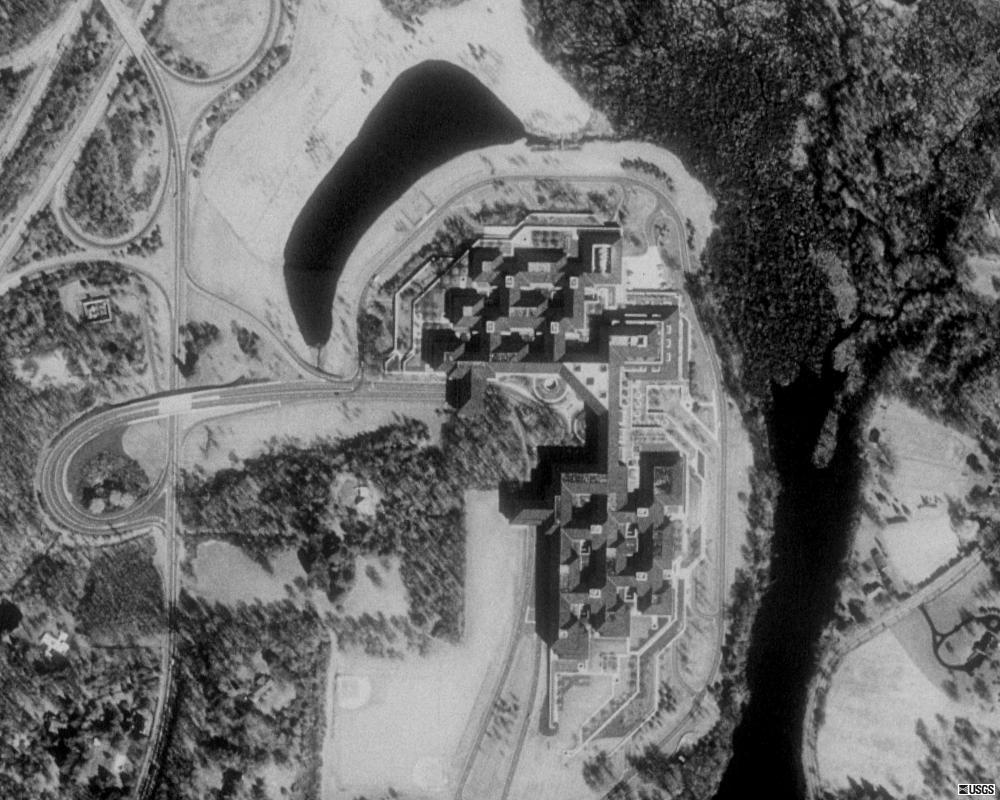
AT&T Basking Ridge complex prior to becoming corporate headquarters. Satellite image from 1991.

In 1969, AT&T began plans to construct an administration corporate complex in the suburbs. In early 1970, AT&T began purchases of land in the suburbs of New Jersey for this office complex and began construction in 1974. The award-winning architect, Vincent Kling, designed a Fordism style, luxurious "Pagoda" campus layout and the construction firms: New York–based Walter Kidde and Newark, New Jersey–based Frank Briscoe, managed this joint venture construction project with Vollers Construction of Branchburg, New Jersey, as the subcontractor. The 295 North Maple Avenue and Interstate 287 location of Basking Ridge in Bernards Township, New Jersey was completed in 1975 for the AT&T General Department offices. Employees began moving, in November 1975, to the seven inter-connected building complex using 28 acre of the property. The property had a 15-acre underground parking garage with spaces for 3,900 vehicles, and included a Class 1 licensed private helipad, a two-story cafeteria, a wood-burning fireplace, an indoor waterfall at the entrance lobby, and a seven-acre created lake for flood control. The entire property was 130 acre and cost $219 million to construct. Later, across the street from the complex, AT&T purchased additional land and established its Learning Center in 1985, at 300 North Maple Avenue, to become a 171 conference room inn. The AT&T Learning Center won the commercial property known as Somerset County's Land Development Award that year. In 1992, Basking Ridge location would become a corporate headquarters just before AT&T leased the New York City, 550 Madison Avenue building to Sony in 1993. The corporate statue, known as "Golden Boy" was moved in 1992, from the former New York City headquarters to this current New Jersey headquarters. In 1992, a corporate art consultant approached, artist sculptor, Elyn Zimmerman, to commission a 30-foot diameter project with fountain and seating area for the conference center courtyard gardens. In 1994, the project was completed and had one 34 ton granite boulder centered on top of the other boulders, which flowed water from the fountain designed by fountain engineer, Dr. Gerald Palevsky. AT&T occupancy at the location peaked to 6,000 employees in its heyday before AT&T experienced competition and downsizing.

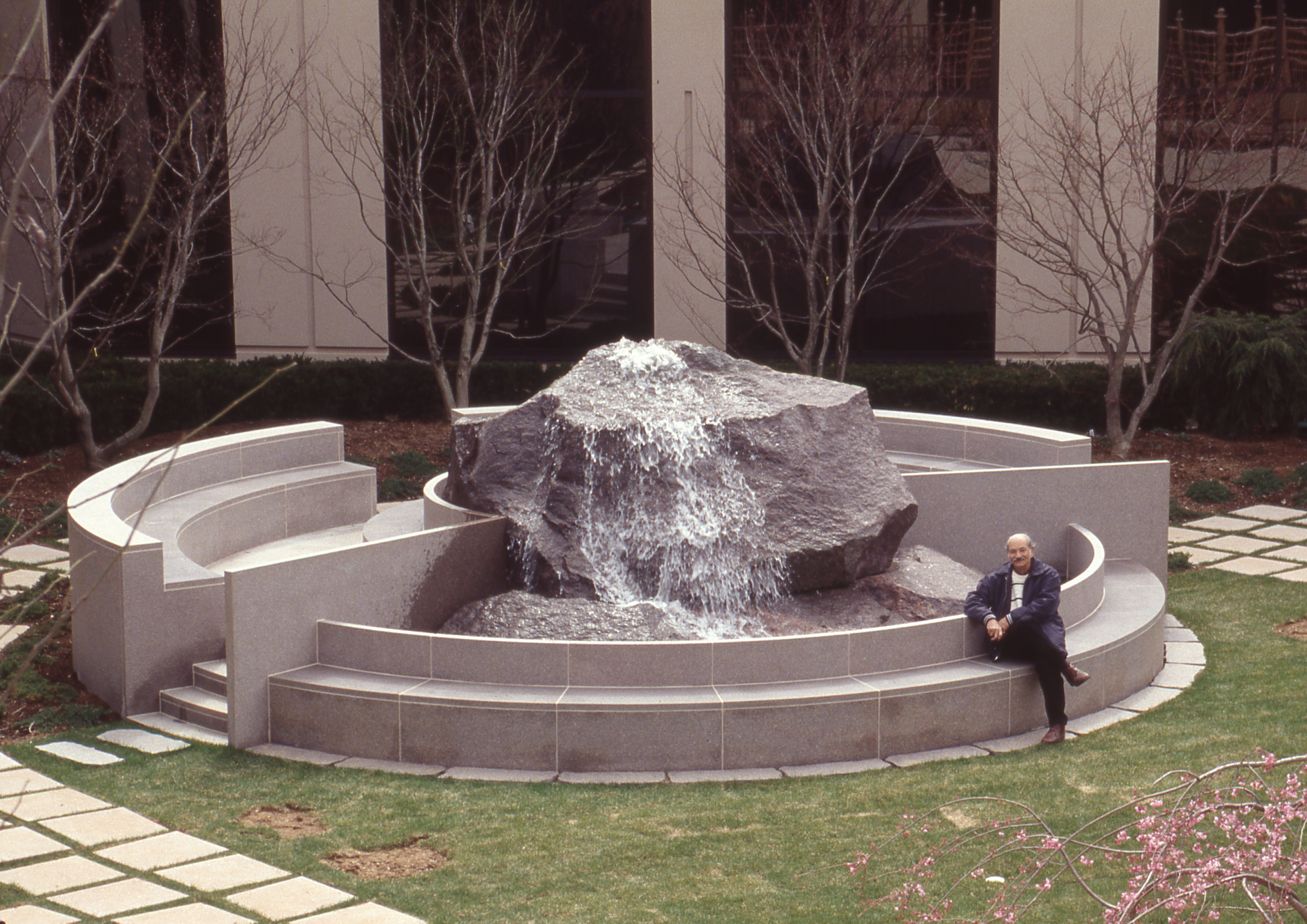
AT&T Learning Center courtyard, fountain sculpture designed by Elyn Zimmerman (not pictured)

In October 2001, the Basking Ridge property was 140 acre with 2.6 million square feet and was placed for sale. Basking Ridge employee occupancy, prior to the sale were approximately 3,200 employees. In April 2002, Pharmacia Corporation purchased the complex for $210 million for their corporate headquarters from existing Peapack-Gladstone, New Jersey headquarters. A short time afterwards, in 2005, Verizon purchased the former complex, excluding the hotel/conference room building, from Pfizer for Verizon Wireless Headquarters and consolidation of employees from Manhattan as well as other nearby New Jersey building locations. In 2007, Pfizer placed the North Maple Inn for sale. At the time, it was a four-diamond, certified hotel and conference center under IACC ("International Association of Conference Centers") designation. In 2015, Verizon performed a sale-leaseback agreement valued at $650.3 million on the complex with the address previously known as One Verizon Way. In 2017, the 35 acre hotel/conference center was known as the Dolce Basking Ridge Hotel and sold for $30 million.

=== Dissolution ===
On February 15, 2024, AT&T Inc. filed notice with the Kentucky Public Service Commission that it intends to make an internal structural change and merge AT&T Corp. into AT&T Enterprises, Inc., which will become a limited liability company. In a filing with the South Dakota Secretary of State dated January 30, 2024, the reason given for the merger is that New York state law does not allow AT&T Corp. to be directly converted into an LLC. Although acquired by SBC in 2005, AT&T Corp. has remained a separate entity within the corporate structure of AT&T Inc. The merger, said to create "greater operational efficiencies", will end the existence of the nearly 140-year-old entity. The internal merger took effect on May 1, 2024.

== Divisions and subsidiaries ==
AT&T, prior to its merger with SBC Communications, had three core companies:

- AT&T Alascom
- AT&T Communications
- AT&T Laboratories

AT&T Alascom sold service in Alaska. AT&T Communications was renamed AT&T Communications – East, Inc. and sold long-distance telephone service and operated as a CLEC outside of the borders of the Bell Operating Companies that AT&T owned. It has now been absorbed into AT&T Corp. and all but 4 of the original 22 subsidiaries that formed AT&T Communications continue to exist. AT&T Laboratories has been integrated into AT&T Labs, formerly named SBC Laboratories.

== Nicknames and branding ==
AT&T was formerly known as "Ma Bell" and affectionately called "Mother" by phone phreaks. During some strikes by its employees, picketers would wear T-shirts reading, "Ma Bell is a real mother." Before the break-up, there was greater consumer recognition of the "Bell System" name, in comparison to the name AT&T. This prompted the company to launch an advertising campaign after the break-up to increase its name recognition. Spinoffs like the Regional Bell Operating Companies or RBOCs were often called "Baby Bells". Ironically, "Ma Bell" was acquired by one of its "Baby Bells", SBC Communications, in 2005.

The AT&T Globe Symbol, the corporate logo designed by Saul Bass in 1983 and originally used by AT&T Information Systems, was created because part of the United States v. AT&T settlement required AT&T to relinquish all claims to the use of Bell System trademarks. It has been nicknamed the "Death Star" in reference to the Death Star space station in Star Wars which the logo resembles. In 1999 it was changed from the 12-line design to the 8-line design. Again in 2005 it was changed to the 3D transparent "marble" design created by Interbrand for use by the parent company AT&T Inc.

== List of AT&T chief executive officers ==
The following is a list of the 16 CEOs of AT&T Corporation, from its incorporation in 1885 until its purchase by SBC Communications in 2005.

#	Chief executive officer	Years in office	Title
1	Theodore Newton Vail	1885–1887	President
2	John E. Hudson	1887–1900	President
3	Frederick Perry Fish	1901–1907	President
4	Theodore Newton Vail	1907–1919	President
5	Harry Bates Thayer	1919–1925	President
6	Walter Sherman Gifford	1925–1948	President
7	Leroy A. Wilson	1948–1951	President
8	Cleo F. Craig	1951–1956	President
9	Frederick Kappel	1956–1961; 1961–1967	President; Chairman
10	H. I. Romnes	1967–1972	Chairman
11	John D. deButts	1972–1979	Chairman
12	Charles L. Brown	1979–1986	Chairman
13	James E. Olson	1986–1988	Chairman
14	Robert Eugene Allen	1988–1997	Chairman
15	C. Michael Armstrong	1997–2002	Chairman
16	David Dorman	2002–2005	Chairman

== See also ==
- Bell Telephone Memorial, a monument sculpted by W.S. Allard, commemorating the invention of the telephone
- International Bell Telephone Company, sister company to American Bell Telephone, with its headquarters in Brussels, Belgium
