= Frederick Perry Fish =

American lawyer

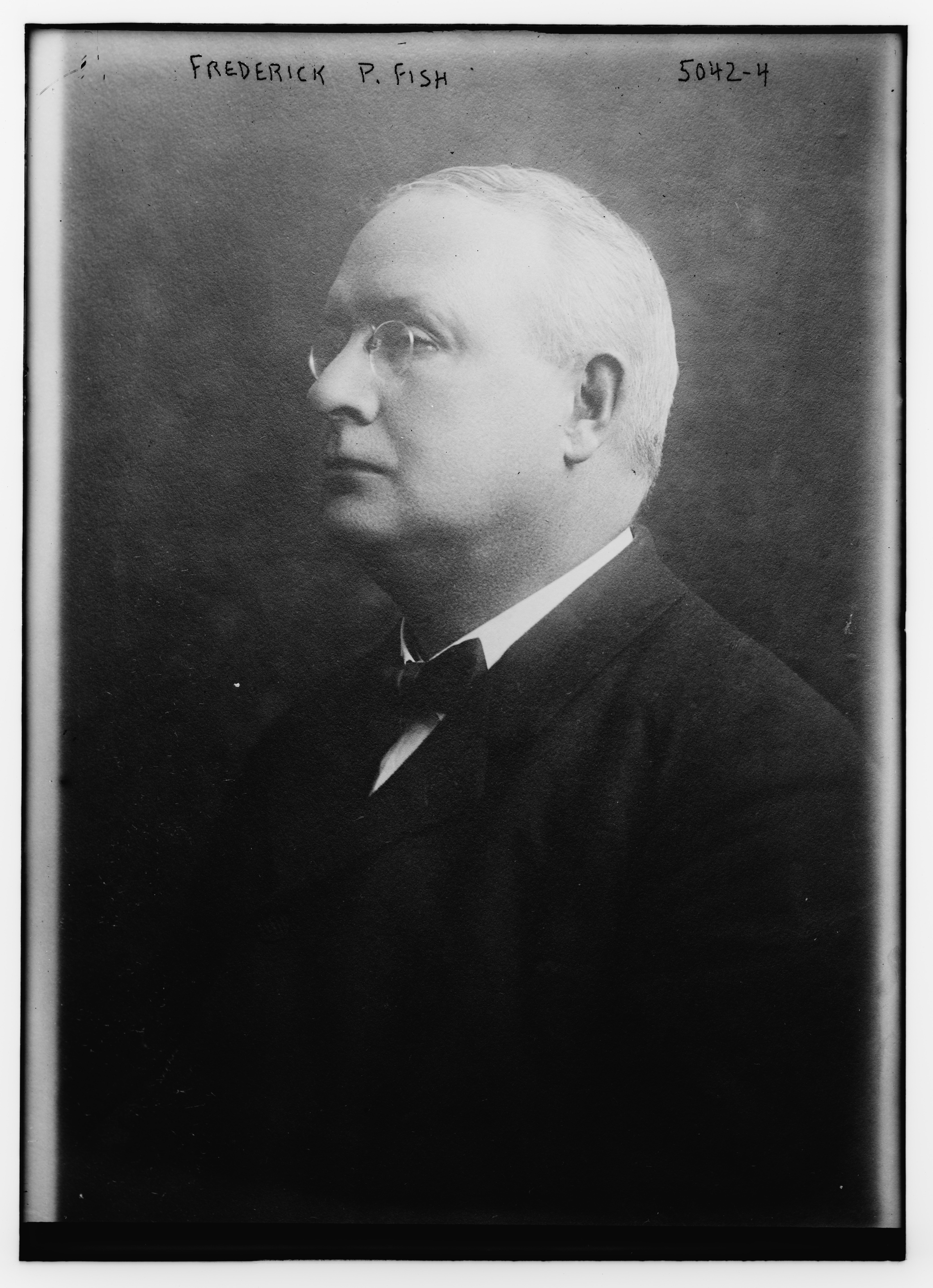

President of American Telephone & Telegraph Corporation
- In office 1901–1907
- Preceded by: John Elbridge Hudson
- Succeeded by: Theodore Newton Vail

Personal details
- Born: January 13, 1855; Taunton, Massachusetts, U.S.
- Died: November 6, 1930 (aged 75); Brookline, Massachusetts, U.S.
- Spouse: Clara Perkins Livermore (m. 1880; died 1914)
- Children: Erland F. Fish
- Education: Harvard College; Harvard Law School
- Occupation: Patent Lawyer

Frederick Perry Fish (13 January 1855 – 6 November 1930) was an American lawyer and executive who served as president of American Telephone & Telegraph Corporation from 1901 to 1907. One of the leading patent attorneys of his age, representing such clients as Alexander Graham Bell, Thomas Edison, and The Wright Brothers, by the time of his death he was believed to have appeared in more patent cases at the Supreme Court than any other lawyer. He was the founder of the law firm now known as Fish & Richardson.

== Early life ==
Fish was born on 13 January 1855 in Taunton, Massachusetts, to Frederick L. Fish (1813–1892) and Mary Jarvis (née Perry) Fish (1833–1910). Among his siblings were Nathaniel J. W. Fish, the mayor of Taunton, and engineer Charles Henry Fish.

Fish's paternal grandparents were Simeon Fish and Judith (née Rayder) Fish and his maternal grandparents were the Rev. Clark Perry and Mary Jarvis (née Stone) Perry.

Fish attended Harvard College and Harvard Law School. He was admitted to the bar in 1878.

== Career ==
Fish worked at the law firm of Thomas L. Livermore and Senator Bainbridge Wadleigh in Boston. During his lifetime, the law firm was successively renamed Wadleigh & Fish (1878); Livermore & Fish (1885); Livermore, Fish & Richardson (1889); Fish, Richardson & Storrow (1890); Fish, Richardson, Herrick & Storrow (1899); Fish Richardson, Herrick & Neave (1900); Richardson, Herrick & Neave (1901); Fish, Richardson, Herrick & Neave (1907); and Fish, Richardson & Neave (1916). In 1969, after Fish's death, the firm adopted its current name, Fish & Richardson.

Fish's specialty was patent law. He was involved in key patent litigation during development of the telephone, the air brake, the steam turbine, the automobile, the airplane, the radio, and other electric appliances.

In 1901, Fish left law practice to serve as the president of AT&T. During his tenure at AT&T, he oversaw completion of a unified national network of telephone lines.

In 1907, Fish turned down the presidency of the Massachusetts Institute of Technology and returned to law. That year, he first credited Thomas Edison with suggesting "hello" as a more efficient telephone greeting than "Are you there?" or "Are you ready to talk?" Alexander Graham Bell had proposed "ahoy".

In 1906, Fish helped the Wright Brothers secure their patent on wing warping. In 1913, Fish helped them prevail over Glenn Curtiss in an infringement case involving the 1906 “Flying Machine” patent. Wilbur Wright's last known letter before his death was to Fish.

=== Volunteer work and legacy ===
Fish served as vice president of the Bar Association of the City of Boston from 1909 to 1920, and president of the Massachusetts State Bar Association for the year 1919–20. He served on the Corporation of the Massachusetts Institute of Technology and the Governing Board of Radcliffe College. He was also an overseer of Harvard College, a trustee of the American School of Classical Studies in Athens, and chairman of the Massachusetts State Board of Education.

Firm partner William King Richardson wrote in his eulogy for Fish, "He was a great lawyer and a great scholar, but above all he was a great human being. Each of the thousands who came in contact with him during his extraordinarily active life is better for having known him. He radiated kindliness, sympathy and courage."

== Personal life ==
On April 7, 1880, Fish married Clara Perkins Livermore (1851–1914), a daughter of Leonard Jarvis Livermore, a minister, and Mary Ann Catherine (née Perkins) Livermore of Cambridge, Massachusetts. They had two children, Margaret A. Fish and Erland Frederick Fish (1883–1942), a Major General and commander of the Massachusetts State Guard who served as President of the Massachusetts Senate.

Fish died at his home in Brookline, Massachusetts, on November 6, 1930.
