= KFAY (Oregon) =

Radio station in Medford, Oregon (1922–1924)

KFAY was licensed in August 1922 as Medford, Oregon's first broadcasting station, and was also the first radio station in southern Oregon. The station was deleted in late 1924. Two years later KFAY's owner, W. J. Virgin, founded KMED in Medford.

== History ==
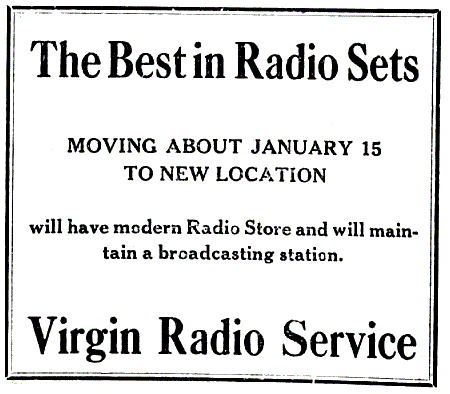
In January 1924 the Virgin Radio Service store and KFAY moved to a new location on West Main Street.

KFAY's history is generally traced to the fall of 1921, when four radio enthusiasts—Elmer Morrison, Sam Jordan, owner of an automotive and electronics shop, Floyd Rush, a veteran radio operator, and William ("Bill") Virgin—constructed a 5-watt transmitter in Morrison's garage at 1049 Ashland Street in Ashland. It is not clear if this transmitter was licensed, or if it ever expanded beyond experimental transmissions at this time.

Effective December 1, 1921, the Department of Commerce, the current regulators of radio, adopted regulations to formally establish a broadcast service category, which set aside the wavelength of 360 meters (833 kHz) for "entertainment" broadcasting, and 485 meters (619 kHz) for "market and weather reports". In May 1922 it was announced that fundraising was taking place to finance the construction of a broadcasting station in Central Point. On July 21, 1922 the Medford Mail Tribune further reported that "W. J. Virgin of Central Point is installing a radio transmitting set and will broadcast market and news reports furnished by The Mail Tribune. He will start with a 5-watt station, but a 50-watt transmitter will be installed as soon as possible. The reports will be able to be heard with suitable receiving apparatus all over southern Oregon. It is expected that the set will be in operation within the next three weeks. Mr. Virgin is doing the work himself and has bought the apparatus. Concerts will be broadcasted in addition to the news and market reports from The Mail Tribune." Three days later an additional newspaper report stated that Virgin was setting up the station at the family's milling site at Central Point, and was preparing to "broadcast the status of fruit and grain prospects throughout the valley".

KFAY received its first license in August 1922, which was issued to the E. J. Virgin Milling Co. in Central Point, for operation on the 360 meter "entertainment" wavelength. The call letters were randomly assigned from an alphabetical list. The station apparently never made any broadcasts from Central Point. The owner was changed to Virgin's Radio Service, and it was announced that construction had started to set up the station on the Jackson County fairgrounds in Medford. Broadcasting equipment was installed above the orchestra platform in the amusement pavilion, with plans to feature "the latest popular dance music as present by Launspach's pavilion orchestra". KFAY's debut broadcast was made from the fairgrounds on September 23, and it was announced that regular programs would be broadcast Monday, Wednesday and Friday nights.

In April 1923 burglars broke into the fairgrounds building housing the station and stole most of its equipment. However, the broadcasting apparatus was eventually recovered and reassembled and the station was able to resume operations. In July the station began broadcasting daily Department of Agriculture market reports. In January 1924 Virgin's radio store and the broadcasting station were moved from the fairgrounds to the Springer-Lee location on West Main Street. In March KFAY broadcast returns for the Medford basketball team's game at the National Interscholastic Basketball Tournament in Chicago, based on telegraphed reports. In May the station teamed up with the Medford Mail Tribune to broadcast local election returns.

During its short life KFAY faced significant financial pressures, especially since at this time it did not carry advertising. An anonymous letter published in the November 23, 1922 Medford Mail Tribune reported that the cost of running the station had already become a financial burden, and there was a possibility that the station might be moved to another town. In March 1923 the Medford Chamber of Commerce directors reviewed whether the community should provide financial support, after they were informed that "the total expense of the station has been paid for by W. J. Virgin but it has cost him more than what he can afford to spend, therefore he has signified his intention to close the station unless outside assistance is rendered".

In late 1923, the station was reassigned to 1060 kHz. In 1924, the American Telephone & Telegraph Company (AT&T), which held a number of important radio patents, announced that existing stations would have to pay for the right to use its patents, and the company started legal proceeding against infringers, beginning with a widely publicized suit against station WHN (now WEPN) in New York City. Virgin reported that AT&T wanted a $500 licensing fee if KFAY was to continue operating. Around this time KFAY ended its broadcasts, and its license was formally deleted in December 1924. An experimental license with the call sign 7XAC, which had been issued to W. J. Virgin in October 1923, was deleted a few months later.

In December 1926 Virgin resumed broadcasting, with the establishment of a new station, KMED, which ceased broadcasting on January 8, 2023, and was deleted, as KYVL, on September 19, 2024.
