= Theodore Newton Vail =

American industrialist (1845–1920)

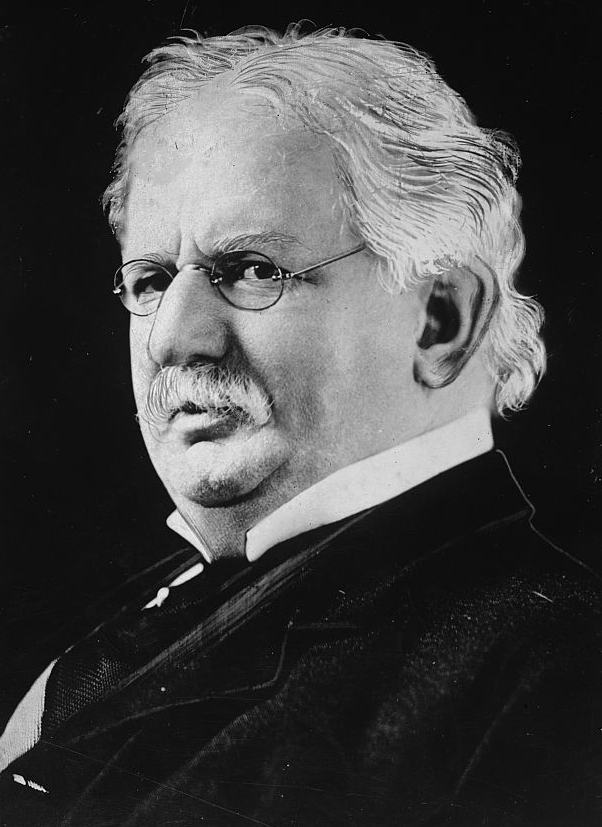
- Vail in 1913

4th President of American Telephone & Telegraph
- In office 1907–1919
- Preceded by: Frederick Perry Fish
- Succeeded by: Harry Bates Thayer

1st President of American Telephone & Telegraph
- In office 1885–1887
- Preceded by: Inaugural holder
- Succeeded by: John Elbridge Hudson

Personal details
- Born: July 16, 1845 Malvern, Ohio, U.S.
- Died: April 16, 1920 (aged 74) Baltimore, Maryland, U.S.
- Spouse: Emma Righter (m. 1869; died 1905)

Theodore Newton Vail (July 16, 1845 – April 16, 1920) was an American businessman who served as the general manager of the Bell Telephone Company from 1878 to 1887 and became the founding president of the American Telephone and Telegraph Company (AT&T) in 1885. Vail viewed telephone service as a public utility and moved to consolidate telephone networks under the Bell system. In 1913, he oversaw the Kingsbury Commitment that led to a more open system for connection.

== Early life ==
Theodore was born on July 16, 1845, in Malvern, Ohio, and was educated in Morristown, New Jersey. He initially studied medicine with his uncle. He also studied telegraphy. Success in telegraphy inspired him to go to New York City, where he became manager of a local telegraphy office. He then joined the staff of a superintendent of United States Telegraph, which ultimately became Western Union.

== Career ==
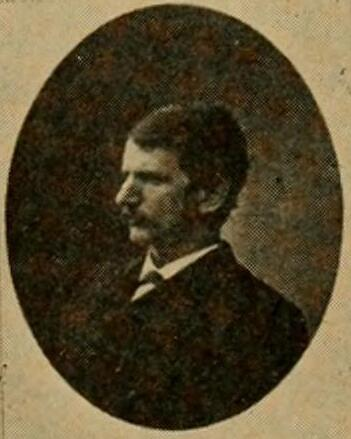
Portrait of Vail in 1877

In 1866, Vail went west with his father to farm. In the fall of 1868, he was made operator and afterward agent at Pine Bluffs, Wyoming, on the Union Pacific Railroad. Pine Bluffs at that time was the principal supply point for wood for the Union Pacific, which had not then been completed.

In Spring 1869, Vail was appointed clerk of the railway mail service between Omaha, Nebraska, and Ogden, Utah. His success in getting the mail through during the snow blockage of 1870 drew the attention of upper management.

He was promoted to the Chicago and Iowa City railway post office, an important distribution point at the time. When the railway post office was established on the Union Pacific, Vail was promoted to head clerk.

In March 1873, Vail was assigned to duty in the office of the General Superintendent of Railway Mail Service in Washington, D.C., where he oversaw mail distribution and justified to Congress the compensation the railways received for carrying the mail. In June 1874, he was appointed Assistant Superintendent of Railway Mail Service. In 1875, he became Assistant General Superintendent.

In February 1876, Vail was appointed General Superintendent after his boss retired. He reached the highest grade attainable in this branch of the federal government and was the youngest officer in the Railway Mail Service, both in years and terms of service. When this final appointment was made by the Postmaster General, the Postmaster General said his only objection with Vail was his youth.

As General Superintendent, Vail helped place U.S. Postal employees under general civil service laws and established a system of six months' probationary appointments, which were subsequently adopted by all agencies.

=== American Bell and AT&T ===
The American Bell Telephone Co. had been organized by Gardiner G. Hubbard, father in law of Alexander Graham Bell. As a lawyer and lobbyist, Hubbard had opposed the Post Office Department before Congress for a variety of reasons.

Vail became convinced as a result of his association with Hubbard that the telephone would eventually revolutionize world communication, and he became a vigorous, though generally unsuccessful, promoter of Bell stock. Hubbard was impressed with Vail and offered him the position of general manager of the American Bell Telephone Company in 1878. Vail defended the Bell patents successfully from challenges from Western Union and others. He introduced the use of copper wire in telephone and telegraph lines.

== Personal life ==
Vail was a first cousin to Alfred Vail, who was instrumental in developing the first telegraph. In August 1869, Vail married Emma Righter of Newark, New Jersey. They had one son, Davis Righter Vail, who died after a 10-day bout with typhoid fever in 1906. Vail visited Vermont in 1883 and eventually purchased a 1,500-acre (6.1 km^{2}) farm in Lyndon, Vermont, Speedwell Farms, a site for conferences that culminated in the creation of American Telephone & Telegraph. He was a member of the Union League Club of New York, the Algonquin Club in Boston, and Jekyll Island Club.

== Later years and death ==
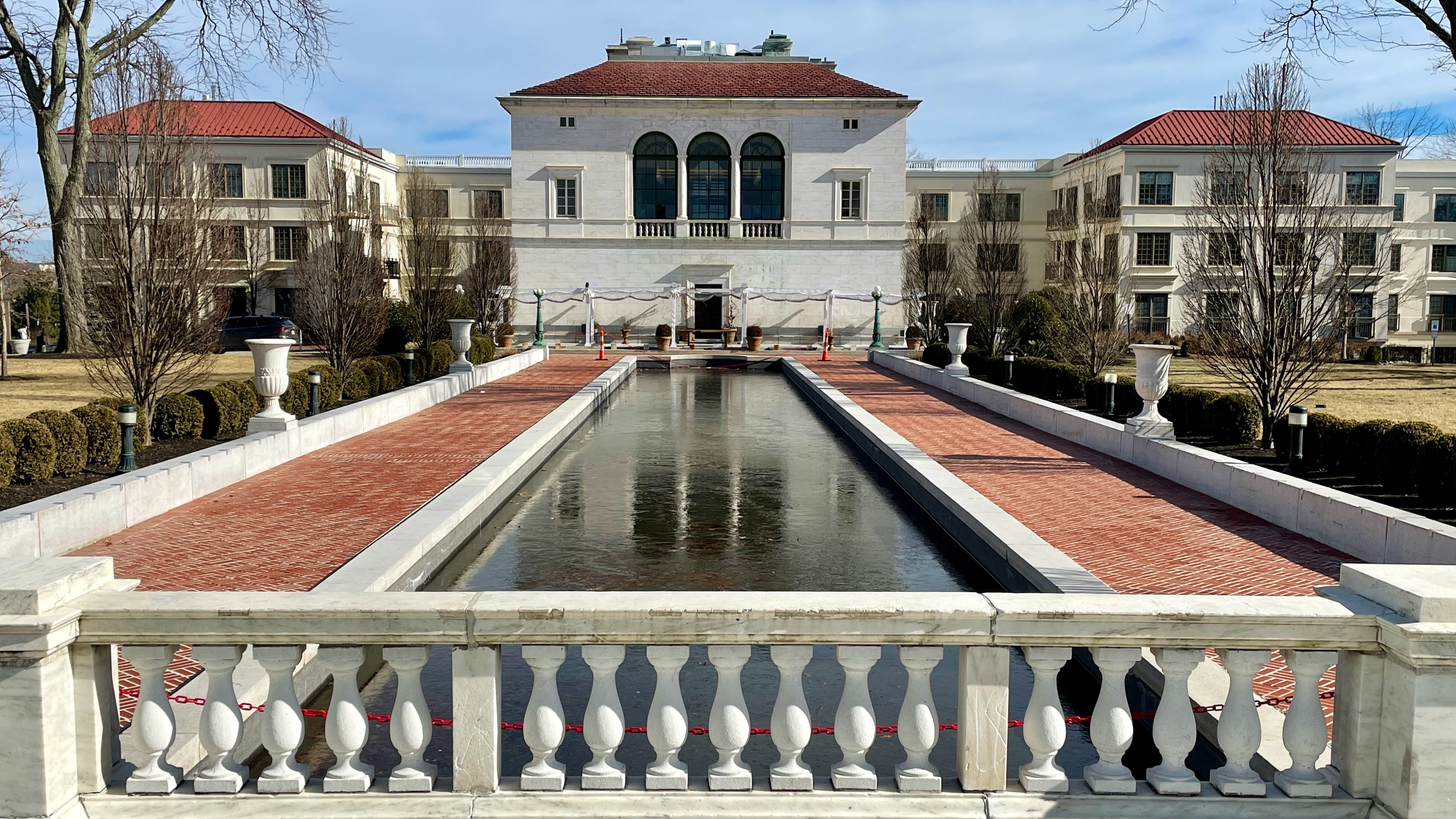
The Vail Mansion and reflecting pool, part of the Morristown Historic District in Morristown, New Jersey

Vail retired in 1888, but only temporarily. He devoted his time to travel and adventure in South America, and promoting the use of the telephone abroad. In 1890, he received a concession from the federal government of Argentina to build a generating station at Cordoba to supply power to a trolley system in Buenos Aires. Vail had purchased a horse-drawn streetcar line serving the city and later bought out all competing lines and consolidated the system.

The Vail Mansion in Morristown, New Jersey, was built 1916–1918 as Vail's residence. It was the Morristown Municipal Building for over 75 years and, as of 2023, is a condominium.

Vail died on April 16, 1920, at Johns Hopkins Hospital in Baltimore. He had been brought to Baltimore from Jekyll Island, Georgia, in his personal rail car. Jekyll Island was a winter retreat for wealthy northern industrialists.

As a tribute to Vail, telephone service across the United States was halted for one minute on the morning of April 18, 1920, while his funeral was conducted in Parsippany, New Jersey. From 11:00 to 11:01, Eastern time (8:00 to 8:01 a.m. Pacific Time), AT&T telephone operators disconnected calls. At the time, "This caused temporary silence of about 12,000,000 telephones and 24,000,000 miles of telephone wire."

== Legacy ==
In his historical review of AT&T, John Brooks explained Vail's contribution to enlightened corporate policy:

Vail's presidential essays in AT&T annual reports are like nothing else in American business literature, before or since. They are personal, revealing, discursive, and sometimes pontifical. "If we don't tell the truth about ourselves, someone else will", Vail said in 1911. ... In 1907, he led off with a section entitled "Public Relations" – by which, as the context made clear, he meant not advertising and promotion, but the whole scope of relations between the corporation and the public. ... Vail introduced the concept ... that maximum private profit was not necessarily the primary objective of private enterprise. Profit was necessary to insure financial health...but was only one element in an equation.

== Other accomplishments ==
In 1910, Vail founded the Vermont School of Agriculture in Lyndon, Vermont, which was subsequently merged into Lyndon Institute, a preparatory school.

Vail acquired the scientific book collection of George Edward Dering in 1911 and presented it to the library of Massachusetts Institute of Technology. The Vail Collection covers topics including "electricity, magnetism, lighter-than-air travel, animal magnetism" and others.

Vail also co-founded Junior Achievement in 1919.

== Namesakes ==
- Vail Campus at the Lyndon Institute in Lyndon, Vermont

Business positions
Preceded by (position created)	President of American Telephone & Telegraph; 1885–1889	Succeeded by John Elbridge Hudson
Preceded by Frederick Perry Fish	President of American Telephone & Telegraph; 1907–1919	Succeeded by Harry Bates Thayer
