= John Elbridge Hudson =

American lawyer and businessman

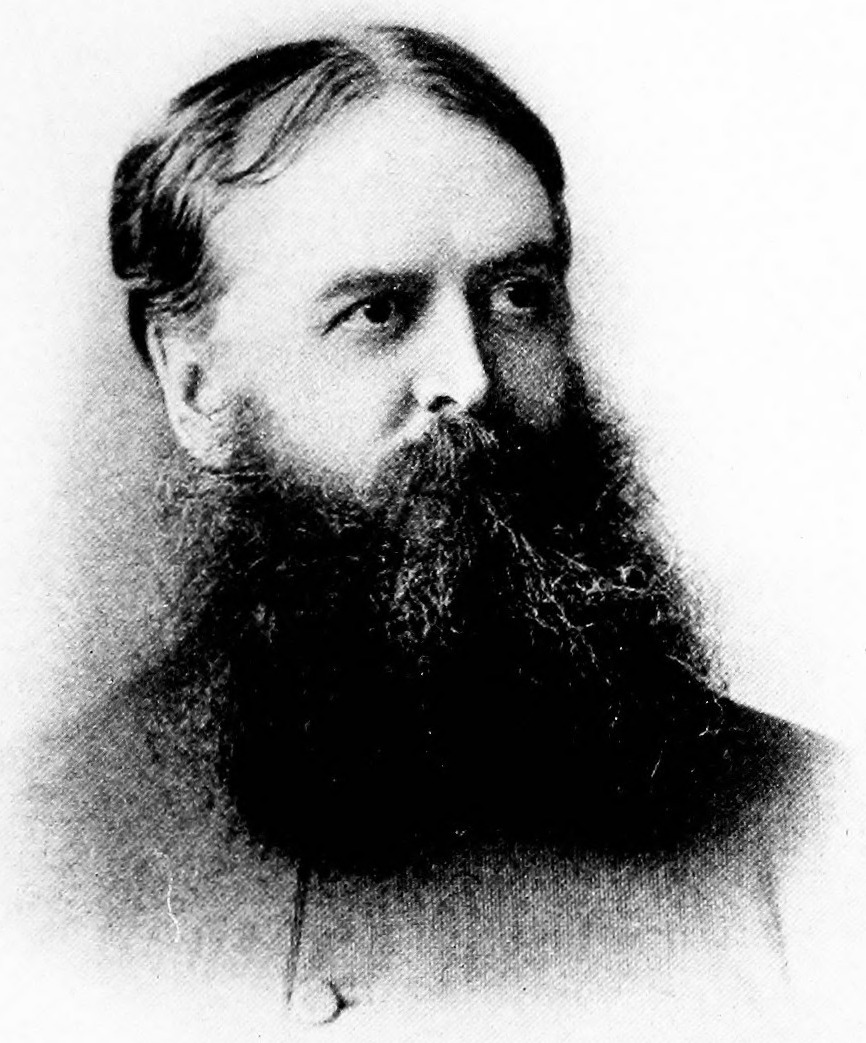

President of American Telephone & Telegraph Corporation
- In office April 1, 1889 – October 1, 1900
- Preceded by: Theodore Newton Vail
- Succeeded by: Frederick Perry Fish

Personal details
- Born: August 3, 1839 Lynn, Massachusetts
- Died: October 1, 1900 (aged 61) Beverly, Massachusetts
- Spouse: Eunice Healey
- Education: Harvard College; Harvard Law School

John Elbridge Hudson (August 3, 1839 – October 1, 1900) was an American lawyer, telephone businessman, and president of AT&T from 1889 to 1900.

== Early life ==
Hudson was born in Lynn, Massachusetts, to John Hudson and Elizabeth C. (née Hilliard) Hudson.

He made Bachelor of Arts at Harvard College in 1862 as valedictorian. He made Bachelor of Laws in 1865 and was admitted to the bar the following year.

== Career ==
After admission to the bar, Hudson joined the Boston law firm Chandler, Shattuck & Thayer, where he became partner in 1870.

In 1878, the firm dissolved, and he became counsel for the American Bell Telephone Company in 1880, later known as AT&T. He became solicitor, vice president on November 29, 1886, and president on April 1, 1889.

Hudson was involved with numerous organizations and learned societies throughout his life, including the American Academy of Arts and Sciences, the corporation of the Massachusetts Institute of Technology, the British Association for the Advancement of Science, the New England Historic Genealogical Society (where he became vice-president), the Colonial Society of Massachusetts, the Bostonian Society, the Lynn Historical Society, the American Institute of Electrical Engineers, the Boston Bar Association, the Virginia Historical Society, and he was elected a member of the American Antiquarian Society in April 1894.

== Personal life ==
Hudson married Eunice Healey, daughter of Wells and Elizabeth (née Pickering) Healey, from Hampton Falls, New Hampshire, on August 23, 1871.

Hudson died on October 1, 1900, in Beverly, Massachusetts.
