= L. A. Wilson =

Leroy August Wilson (February 21, 1901 – June 28, 1951) was an American telecommunications executive who served as president of the American Telephone & Telegraph from 1948 until his death in 1951.

== Early life and education ==
Wilson was born in Terre Haute, Indiana, on February 21 1901. The only child of modest means, he financed his studies at Rose Polytechnic Institute (now Rose-Hulman Institute of Technology) by delivering newspapers, shovelling ore, laying railroad track, and playing semi-professional baseball. He earned a civil engineering degree in 1922 and was one of the first two graduates of the institute's new Army ROTC program to receive a commission in the Engineer Reserve Corps.

== Career ==
Wilson joined Indiana Bell as a clerk immediately after graduation, working night shifts that acquainted him with every department of the company. By 1929, he had moved to AT&T headquarters in New York, becoming general commercial engineer in 1942 and a vice president two years later.

Elected president of AT&T on February 17 1948, Wilson inherited a company whose wartime debt load threatened its bond rating. He launched rate-case campaigns and cost-control programs that began restoring the Bell System's finances and accelerated long-distance network modernisation. He is credited with securing more than $1 billion in new capital at a time when the market was tight, enabling AT&T's largest expansion to date.

In May 1949, President Harry S. Truman asked Wilson to have the Bell System assume management of Sandia Laboratory to support the nation's atomic programme. Wilson agreed on a "no-profit, no-fee" basis, formally accepting the contract on 1 July 1949. Truman's letter praising AT&T's "exceptional service in the national interest" later inspired Sandia’s enduring motto.
