= Corbin Building =

Office building in Manhattan, New York

- U.S. National Register of Historic Places
- U.S. Historic district – Contributing property
- New York State Register of Historic Places
- New York City Landmark
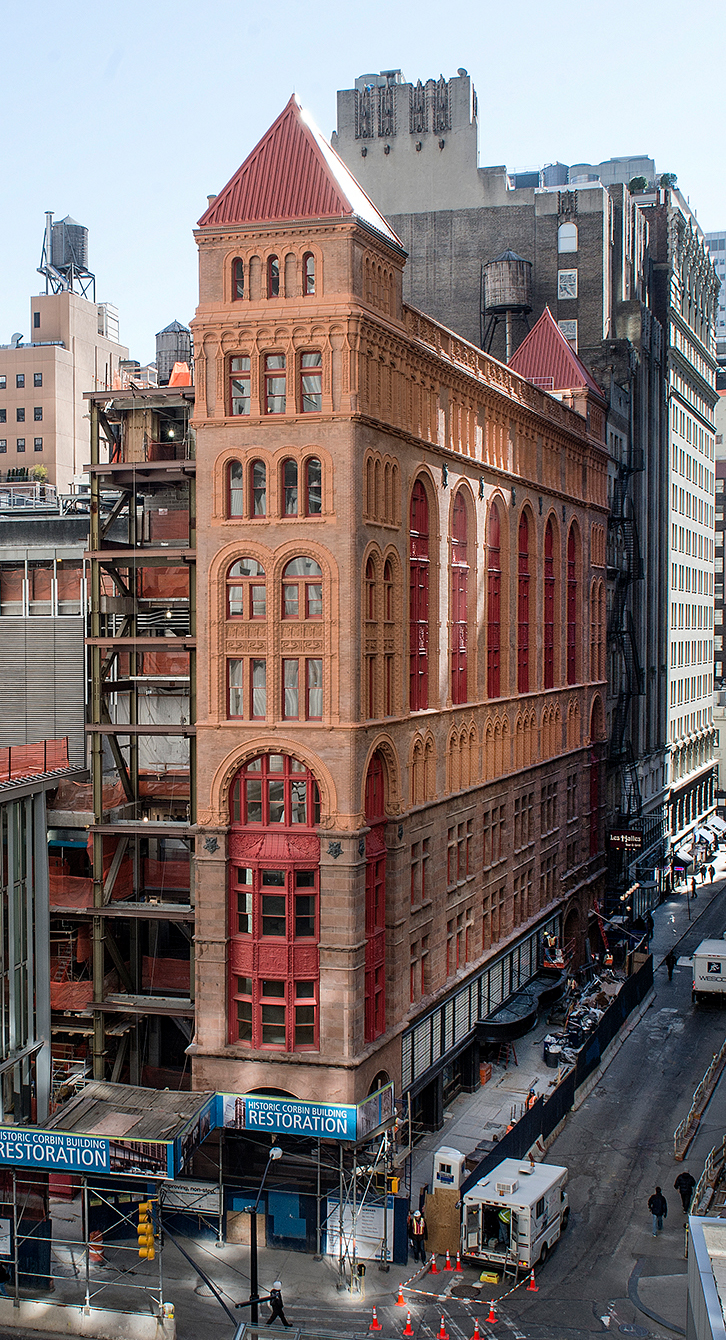
- (2013)
- Location: 13 John Street; Manhattan, New York
- Coordinates: 40°42′36″N 74°00′33″W
- Built: 1888–1889
- Architect: Francis H. Kimball
- Architectural style: Romanesque Revival
- Part of: Fulton–Nassau Historic District (ID05000988)
- NRHP reference No.: 03001302
- NYSRHP No.: 06101.008592
- NYCL No.: 2569

Significant dates
- Added to NRHP: December 18, 2003
- Designated NRHP: September 7, 2005
- Designated CP: September 7, 2005
- Designated NYSRHP: October 17, 2003
- Designated NYCL: June 23, 2015

The Corbin Building (also known as 13 John Street and 192 Broadway) is a historic office building at the northeast corner of John Street and Broadway in the Financial District of Manhattan in New York City. It was built in 1888–1889 as a speculative development and was designed by Francis H. Kimball in the Romanesque Revival style with French Gothic detailing. The building was named for Austin Corbin, a president of the Long Island Rail Road who also founded several banks.

The Corbin Building has a polychrome exterior of brick, brownstone and terracotta featuring rounded arches with terracotta detailing, while its interior vaulted ceilings employ a Guastavino tile system. Structurally, it preceded the use of steel skeletons for skyscrapers, utilizing cast-iron beams and masonry walls that were load-bearing. The Corbin Building sits on a narrow trapezoidal lot with 160 feet (49 m) of frontage on John Street and 20 feet (6.1 m) on Broadway. It was significantly taller than others around at the time it was built.

The building was rehabilitated by the Metropolitan Transportation Authority (MTA) as part of its Fulton Center project, which comprised improvements to the New York City Subway's adjoining Fulton Street station. It was added to the National Register of Historic Places (NRHP) on December 18, 2003, and designated a New York City Landmark on June 23, 2015. It is also a contributing property to the Fulton–Nassau Historic District, an NRHP district created in 2005.

== Site ==
The Corbin Building is in the Financial District of Manhattan, at the northeast corner of Broadway and John Street. 195 Broadway is to the northwest, while the Fulton Building—the head house of the New York City Subway's Fulton Center station complex, served by the 2, 3, 4, 5, A, C, E, J, N, R, W, and Z trains—is to the north. The lot has an irregular trapezoidal shape and measures 20 feet (6.1 m) on Broadway to the west, 162.83 feet (50 m) on John Street to the south, 49.08 feet (15 m) to the east, and 161.33 feet (49 m) to the north.

== Architecture ==
Francis H. Kimball designed the Corbin Building. Most of the building is eight stories high, but there are two single-story towers with pyramidal roofs on the extreme western and eastern ends.

The Corbin Building is considered to be a "transitional" building in the history of early skyscrapers: it was developed after the elevator had been introduced but before skeleton-framed skyscrapers were built. There are wrought iron horizontal beams and cast-iron columns in the internal structure, although the building was also supported by brick, concrete, terracotta, and tile, which also served to fireproof the structure. The internal structure was supported on masonry walls that were load-bearing. The Corbin Building utilized "cage construction" in which the steel structure supported the floors, but not the outer walls. Guastavino tile was utilized on the ceilings, roof, and floors to provide extra fireproofing, and the Corbin Building was supposedly the city's first structure to use such technology. It also used architectural terracotta supplied by the New York Architectural Terra-Cotta Company.

The Corbin Building is 135 feet (41 m) tall. Because the internal structure was not completely made of steel, skyscrapers of the 1880s such as the Corbin Building were generally limited to ten stories. As such, it was significantly taller than others around at the time it was built. It was reported to be the tallest commercial building in New York City at the time of its completion, but both the New York Tribune and Western Union buildings of 1873 far exceeded the Corbin Building's height, at 260 and 230 feet (79 and 70 m), respectively. Architectural writer Robert A. M. Stern stated that "smaller infill buildings" such as the Corbin Building had tended "to experiment with new forms and unusual compositions" since 1880.

=== Facade ===
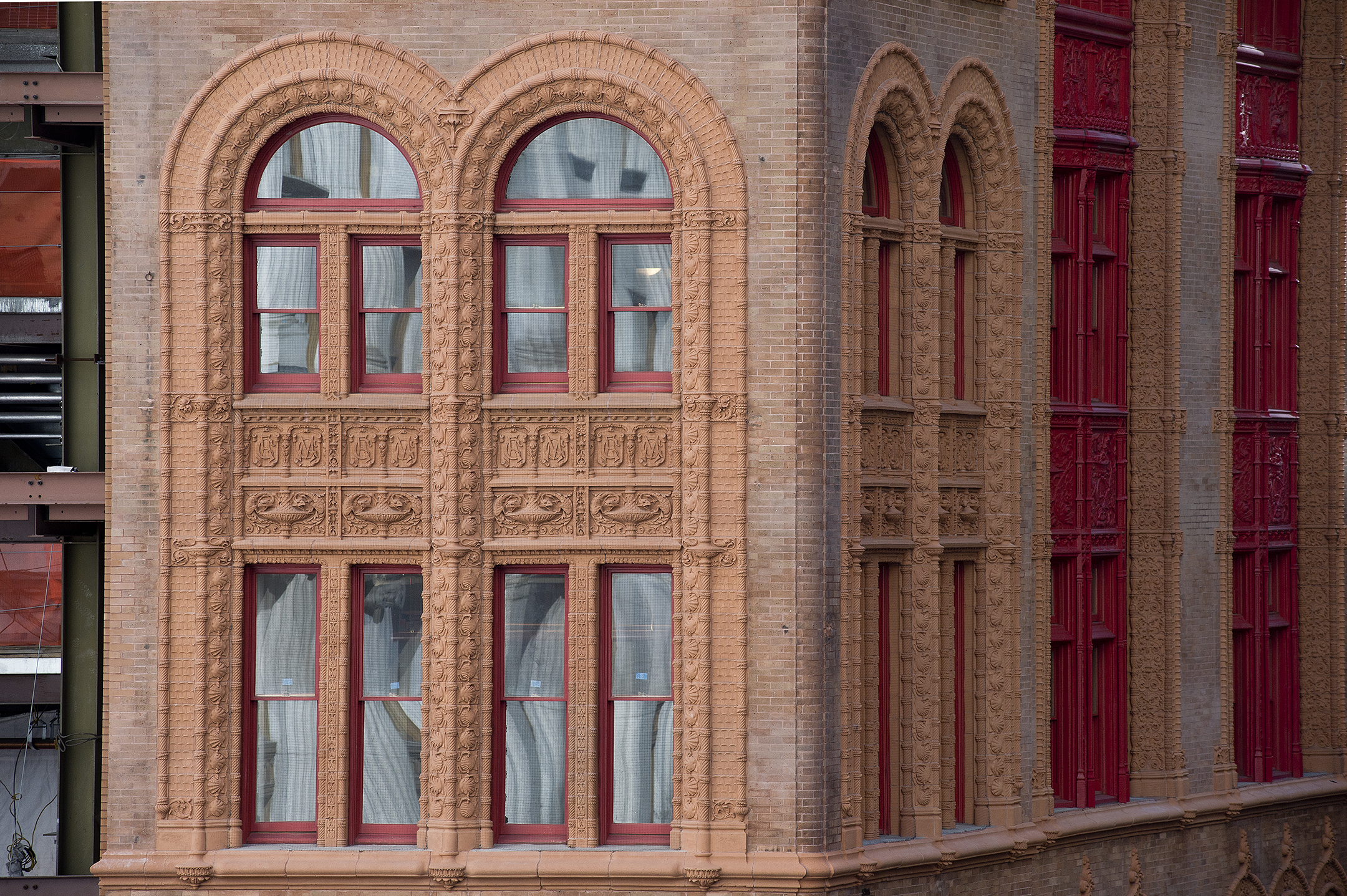
Fifth and sixth stories on Broadway

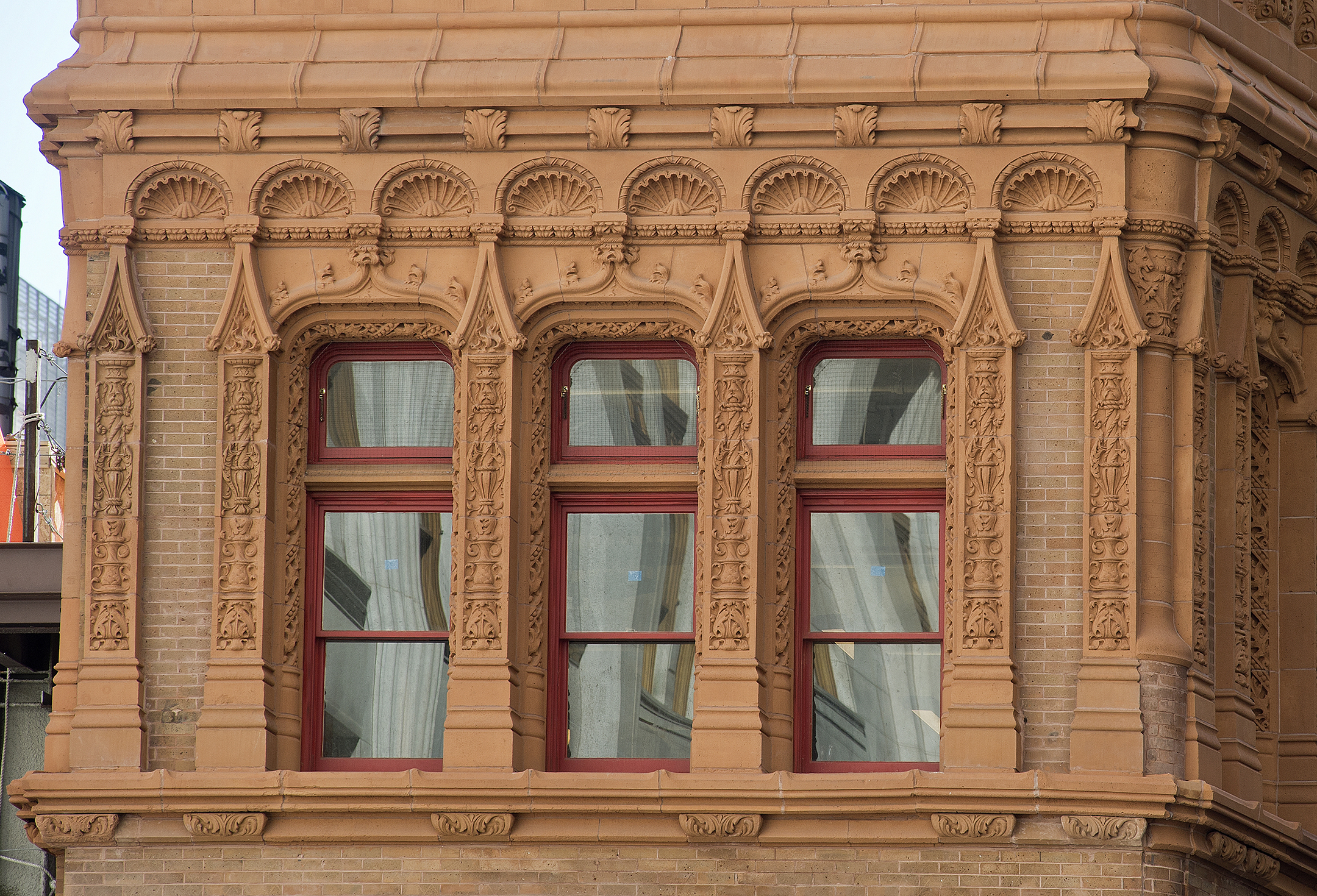
Eighth-story windows

The building's facade contains one bay on Broadway and eight on John Street. The facades are horizontally divided into the ground story, two midsections of three stories each, and an attic. The lowest three stories on both sides are made of Long Meadow brownstone, while the upper stories are clad with light brick surrounded by red-brown terracotta trim. On both of the visible facades, there are belt courses above the first four stories, as well as above the seventh story. A terracotta cornice resembling an arcade runs above the eighth story, while a smaller terracotta cornice runs above the ninth story. The decorations of the Corbin Building resemble those used on other nearby structures like the Potter Building and Temple Court Building.

An identical fenestration pattern is used on the Broadway facade and on either of the outermost bays on John Street, collectively known as the end bays. These bays form the facades of the "end pavilions", the only parts of the building that are nine stories high. The ground floor of the Broadway facade and the westernmost bay on John Street has stone arches supported by stone piers, while in the easternmost bay on John Street, the ground floor has a service entrance. The cornice above the first story of the end bays is supported by brackets and doubles as the second-story window sill. The second to fourth floors of the end bays are located within triple-story round arches. The fifth and sixth floors of the end bays consist of a pair of double arches with ornate terracotta surrounds and spandrels. The fifth story has four sash windows on each bay, while the sixth story has four sash windows under a transom bar with two arched windows. The seventh story of each end bay is composed of two pairs of single-height arched windows in each bay, with terracotta surrounds. On each end bay, the eighth story has three segmental arch windows with four terracotta pilasters, while the ninth story has five narrow round arches, two of which are filled with brick.

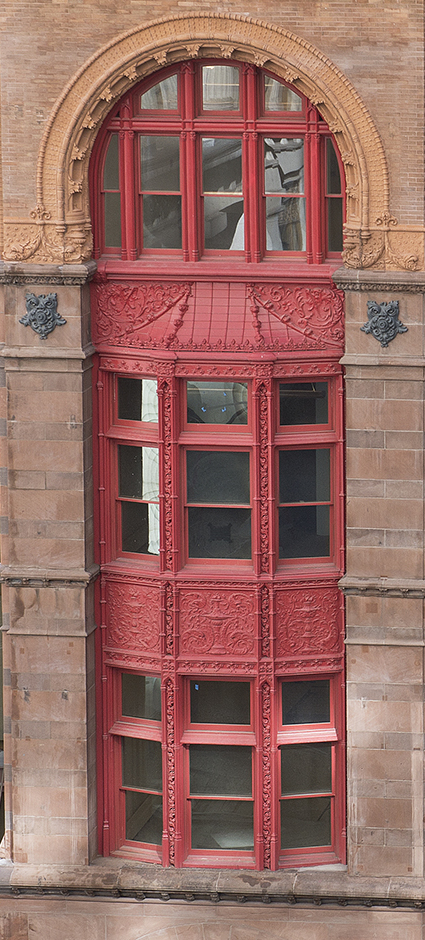
Triple-height arch

The six center bays on John Street also use an identical fenestration pattern to each other. At ground level, the main entrance to the building is on the second bay from the east, and is recessed within a decorative round arch. The interior of the arch contains ornate details, while the exterior is supported by heavy stone piers and is topped by a keystone, a Gothic molding, and a small blind arcade of four pairs of arches. The other bays contain a steel-and-glass enclosure with doors leading inside to a set of escalators, which in turn connect to the Fulton Center. On the second through fourth floors, the six center bays contain 2, 3, 3, 3, 3, and 2 windows per floor from west to east. The second- and third-story windows are rectangular, with sills projecting from the third-story windows, while the fourth-story windows are arched with terracotta surrounds. The fifth through seventh stories of the center bays contain triple-story round arches. On the eighth story, each of the center bays has three segmental arch windows with terracotta pilasters, similar to in the end bays.

The windows in the triple-height arches (the second through fourth floors on the end bays, and the fifth through seventh floors on the center bays) have cast-iron surrounds with Gothic foliate decorative elements. Each floor of the triple arches is separated by decorative spandrels. The lower two stories of each triple arches contain a grid of three panes by three panes on each floor. Decorative vertical mullions separate the panes in each bay, which are angled slightly outward, while the horizontal transoms are not decorated. The uppermost story of each triple arch has five window panes: two below the sides of the triple-height arch and three underneath the center with horizontal transoms.

=== Interior ===
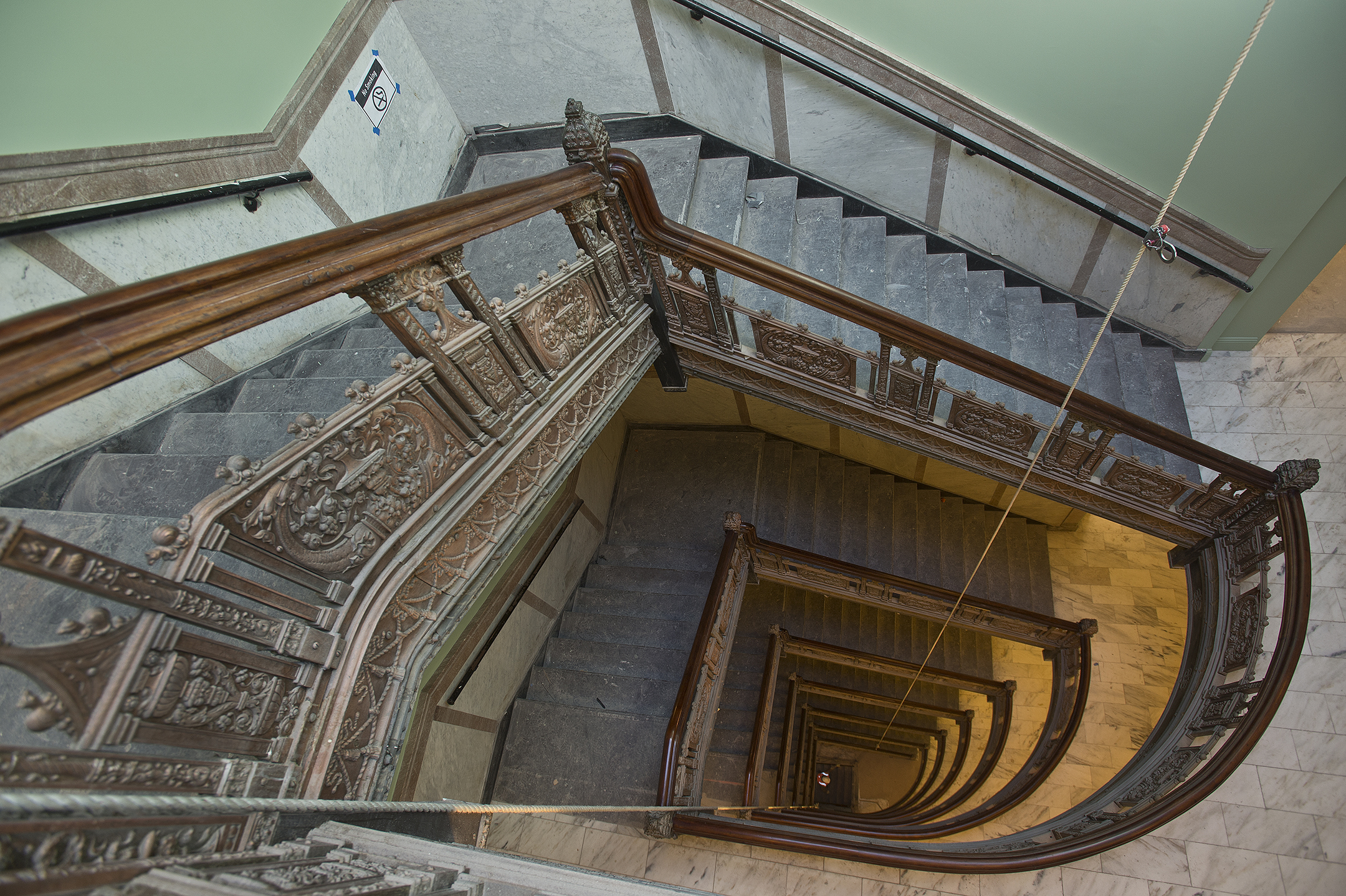
Interior staircase

The interior space is relatively narrow compared to other Financial District buildings, being 46 feet (14 m) wide at its widest point. There was a light court within the Corbin Building that illuminated the second through eighth stories, and has a large open staircase with wooden handrails, metal as well as railing panels and corner posts. An elevator bank is near the staircase. The ground floor was used as a bank and had an open floor plan. Girders were attached to metal columns between the first-floor ceiling and the building's roof, forming the light court.

Since its early-21st-century renovation, the ground floor has contained commercial space and escalators to the underground Fulton Street station, with a direct entrance to the uptown platform of the Lexington Avenue Line station (served by the 4 and 5 trains). A total of 31,000 square feet (2,900 m^{2}) of commercial office space in the above-ground levels of the building is leased out.

An interstitial structure has been built between the Corbin Building and the Fulton Center with a freight elevator and two passenger elevators. The addition brings the Corbin Building into compliance with modern building regulations, and gives added support to the Corbin Building. However, the interstitial building is considered to be a part of the Fulton Center's main building to the north.

== History ==
The Corbin Building's site was owned by the Collegiate Reformed Protestant Dutch Church through the 19th century, though records do not show when the church acquired the site. The site may have been part of a 1724 bequest to the church by landowner John Haberdinck. The lot was leased in 1869 to the North American Fire Insurance Company, which defaulted on the site three years later. Austin Corbin, president of the Long Island Rail Road, acquired the site in 1881, when there were four buildings on the site. In 1886, he signed a 21-year lease with the church in which he was to pay $18,000 in annual rent. The property records show that, as part of the agreement, Corbin would not build a church, school, hospital, charitable building, theater, museum, gambling house, liquor venue, or "a building for noxious uses" on what would become the Corbin Building's site.

=== Construction and early use ===
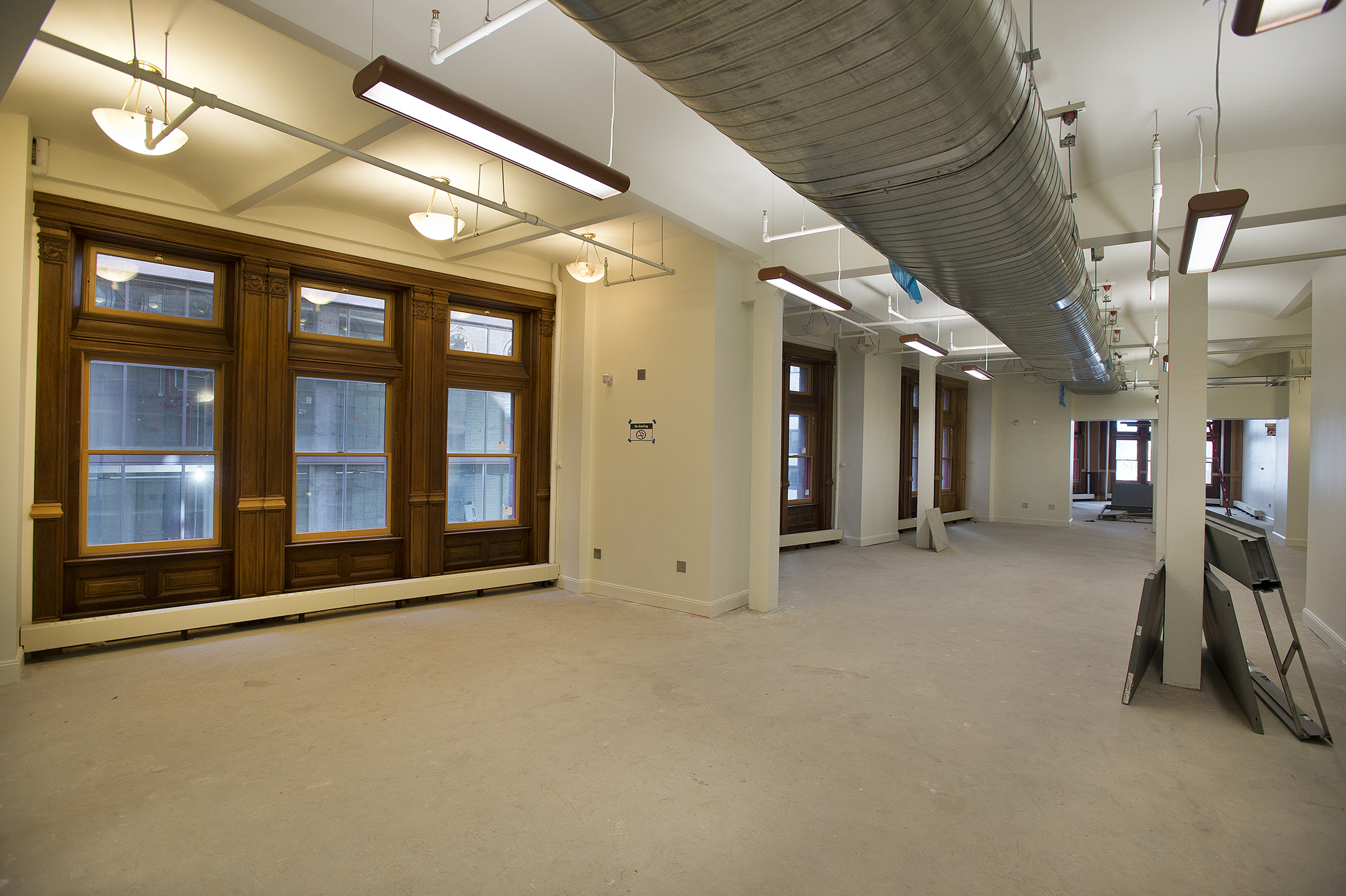
Interior during 2013 restoration

Corbin wished to design a building on the property, which would house his banking firm, with extra space left over for him to rent out. Stephen Decatur Hatch was listed as the original designer, but he is not known to have any connection with the final design. Francis H. Kimball was ultimately responsible for the final design. Kimball's design for the Corbin Building was influenced by his previous experience in the usage of terracotta decorative elements, such as at the Casino Theatre. Intended as a speculative development, the Corbin Building was erected within 11 months between 1888 and 1889.

The Corbin Banking Company leased space in the building until it went bankrupt in 1907. The Corbin Building Company subsequently sold the building in 1908 to the Chatham National Bank of New York; at the time, the land was still held by the Dutch Reformed Church. Chatham National was a long-term lessee of the ground-floor space. The Corbin Building Company apparently became a Chatham National subsidiary, and in 1925, the Schulte Cigar Stores Company bought the building and land lease from the Corbin Building Company. In 1937, jeweler Herman A. Groen leased the corner space from the Dutch Reformed Church.

=== Renovation ===
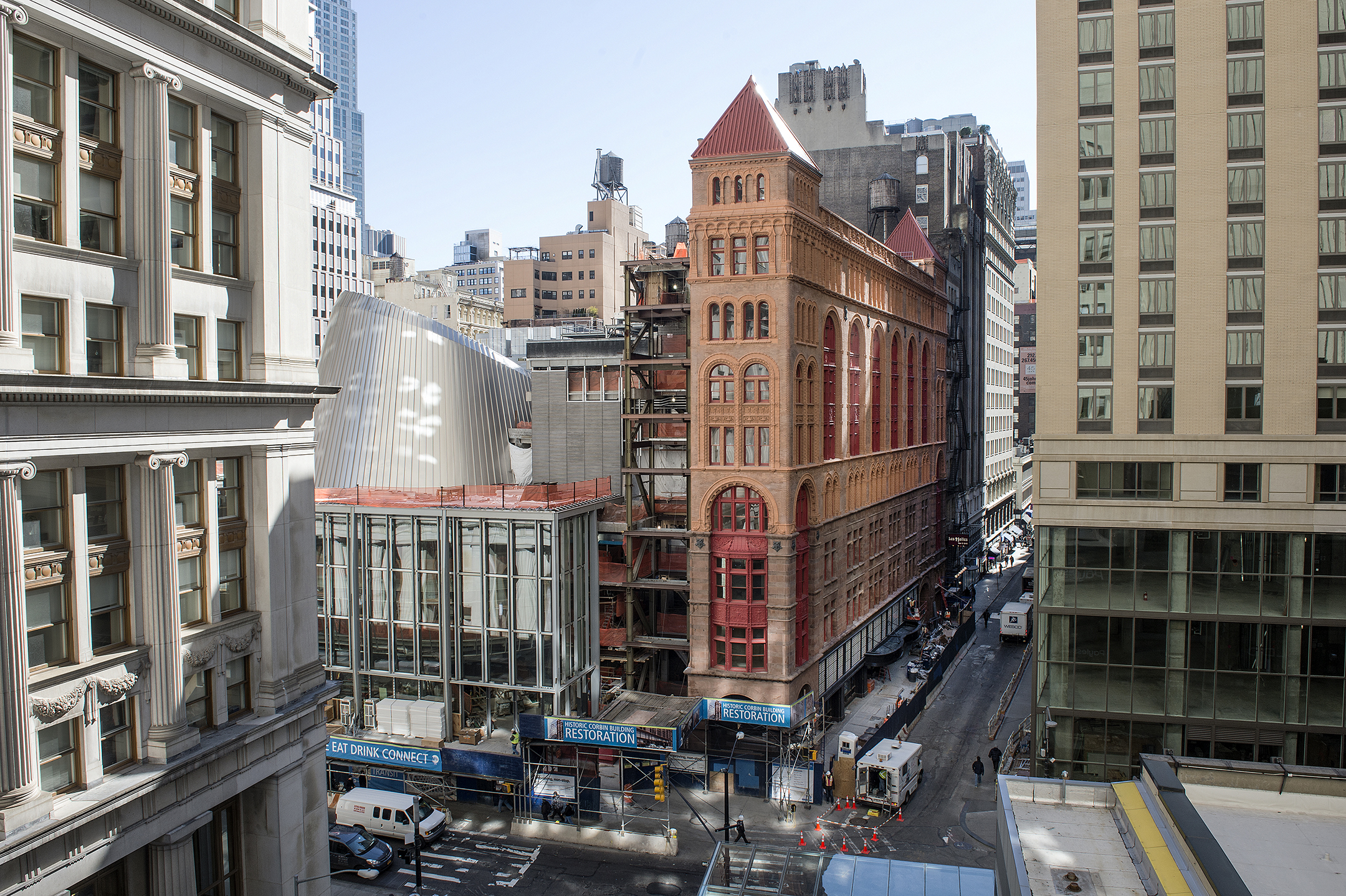
The building during its renovation

After several pieces of transit infrastructure in Lower Manhattan were destroyed or severely damaged during the September 11 attacks in 2001, government officials proposed a $7 billion redesign of transit in the neighborhood, one of which was the Fulton Center. After the Fulton Center project was announced, the World Monuments Fund listed the Corbin Building as one of the 100 most endangered historic sites globally, and one of about 300 historical sites in Lower Manhattan. The Metropolitan Transportation Authority (MTA), which was developing the Fulton Center, considered several options that would either demolish the Corbin Building, leave it alone, or integrate it into the Fulton Center. The MTA conducted a report on the Corbin Building and found that it held historical significance. Other buildings, such as the adjoining Childs Restaurants location and the Girard Building on Broadway, were demolished. The building was added to the National Register of Historic Places (NRHP) in 2003. The same year, the end bays and main entrance were cleaned and renovated. In 2005, the Corbin Building was designated as a contributing property to the Fulton–Nassau Historic District, a NRHP district.

The building was rehabilitated as part of the Fulton Center project, with Judlau Contracting as main contractors, Page Ayres Cowley Architects as sub-consultants, and Arup Group as designer. The project cost $59 million. The ground and basement levels of the building were incorporated into the Fulton Center, serving as an entrance to the subway station below. During construction, the Corbin Building was underpinned by mini-piles that were placed manually due to the small lot area. Sensors and other devices were used to ensure building safety. Foundation work uncovered a well lined with stone, which contained artifacts dating to the late 19th and early 20th centuries, such as newspapers from 1889, an invoice for a jewelry company, and handwritten accounts of stock trades. The underpinning was required due to the rehabilitation of the 4 and 5 trains' platforms and the transit building construction. The building as a whole is integrated into the Fulton Center project, with escalators at John Street descending to the 4 and 5 trains' platforms and the Fulton Building.

The Corbin Building reopened in December 2012, with retail space returning to the ground floor. In 2015, the Corbin Building was designated a city landmark by the New York City Landmarks Preservation Commission. The coworking firm WeWork leased space in the Corbin Building in 2016.

== Reception ==
The Real Estate Record and Guide described the Corbin Building in 1898 as "another example of profuse decoration of surfaces" by Kimball, besides his previous Our Saviour New York building. The Guide said that the surfaces, "together with the color of the terra cotta, produces effects at once agreeable and varied, and almost unattainable in any other material". Another critic in the Guide said that the building was "in many points highly successful, and at all points extremely interesting", although the unnamed critic disapproved of the facade's division into two horizontal sections, rather than into three such sections. Architectural critic Montgomery Schuyler also negatively viewed Kimball's division of the Corbin Building's facade into two sections. However, Schuyler said that the contrast between the brownstone base and the brick-and-terracotta upper stories helped unite the two sections, and also praised the Broadway pavilion "work[ing] out naturally and effectively into a tower".

Modern critics have also praised the Corbin Building. Architectural writers Sarah Landau and Carl Condit wrote in 1996 that the building exhibited "fine detail and slablike proportions". David W. Dunlap of The New York Times wrote in 2003 that "the Corbin Building looks something like a Roman aqueduct with French Renaissance flourishes, arches over arches over arches". Dunlap stated at the time that most of the upper floors were intact while the ground floor had been significantly revised. After the demolition of other structures nearby in the early 20th century, the fifth edition of the AIA Guide to New York City (2010) called the Corbin Building "a slender book-end at the corner, with no books to hold up". The book described the upper-story arches as "asserting strong individuality above a tawdry commercial corner".

== See also ==
- List of New York City Designated Landmarks in Manhattan below 14th Street
- National Register of Historic Places listings in Manhattan below 14th Street
