= Francis H. Kimball =

American architect (1845–1919)

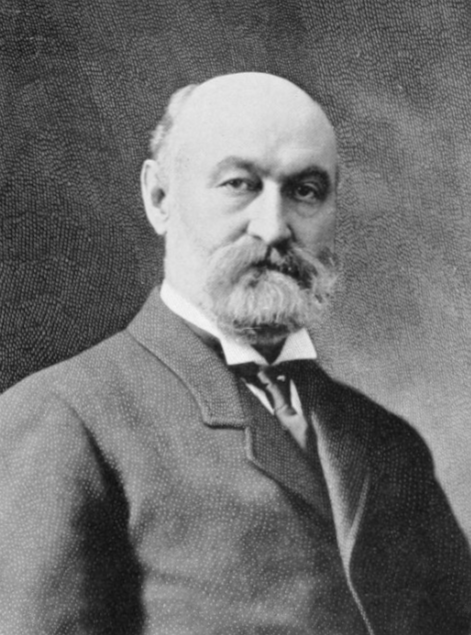
- Born: September 24, 1845; Kennebunk, Maine, US
- Died: December 20, 1919 (aged 74); New York City, US
- Occupation: Architect

Francis Hatch Kimball (September 24, 1845 – December 20, 1919) was an American architect practicing in New York City, best known for his work on skyscrapers in lower Manhattan and terra-cotta ornamentation. He was an associate with the firm Kimball & Thompson. His work includes the Empire Building, Manhattan Life Insurance Building, and Casino Theatre. All but one of Kimball's works were in the United States.

== Life ==
Kimball was born in Kennebunk, Maine. He went on to study architecture in England. In 1879 he joined forces with Thomas Wisedell, with whom he designed the 1882 Casino Theatre on Broadway, and other projects. Wisedell died in 1884. Kimball practiced independently until 1892, when he formed Kimball & Thompson with G. Kramer Thompson. That partnership ended in 1898.

Kimball's Victorian Gothic Catholic Apostolic Church in New York City (1897) was praised by influential architectural critic Montgomery Schuyler as there being "no more scholarly Gothic work in New York." Kimball was also a pioneer in the use of ornamental terra-cotta in the United States, evident on the Corbin Building; on a striking row of townhouses that he designed at 133–143 West 122nd Street in Harlem; and on the Montauk Club in Park Slope, Brooklyn. Contemporaries described Kimball as the "father of the skyscraper".

A 1917 article in The New York Times noted his bankruptcy. Kimball died in 1919 in New York City and buried at Linwood Cemetery in Haverhill, Essex County, Massachusetts.

== Works before 1892 ==
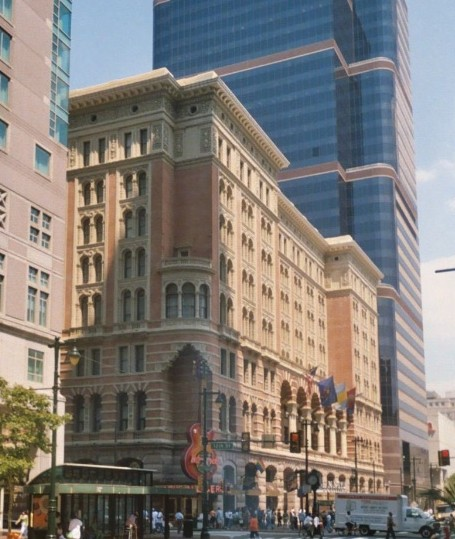
Reading Terminal Headhouse, 1115–41 Market St., Philadelphia, PA (1891–93). Now part of the Pennsylvania Convention Center.

- 26 Broadway (1885), Manhattan, New York; later extensively renovated
- Emmanuel Baptist Church (1887), NW corner of Lafayette Ave and St. James Place, Brooklyn, New York
- Corbin Building (1888), Manhattan, New York
- Reading Company freight depot (1888), 260 Willow Street, Trenton, New Jersey
- 133–143 West 122nd Street townhouses in Harlem, Manhattan, New York
- The Garrick Theater (1890; razed 1932), 67 West 35th Street, Manhattan, New York
- The Montauk Club (1891) Park Slope, Brooklyn, New York
- The Reading Terminal Headhouse (1891–93), Philadelphia, Pennsylvania; housed the offices of the Reading Railroad.
- Fifth Avenue Theatre (1892; razed 1939), 31 West 28th Street Manhattan, New York
- Victorian residence (1889–1890), 2 Mecklenburg Street at Sydney Street, Saint John, New Brunswick; for Robert Thompson Jr (owner of shipping company William Thompson and Company)

== Works as part of Kimball & Thompson (1892–1898) ==
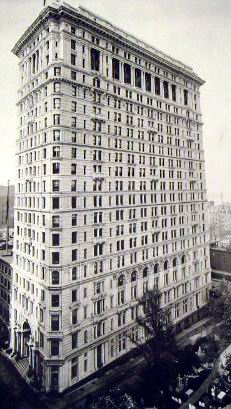
Empire Building

From 1892 to 1898, he was part of Kimball & Thompson which built:

- New York Architectural Terra-Cotta Works Building (1892), 42-16 Vernon Boulevard, Queens, New York
- The Empire Building (1895), 71 Broadway, Manhattan, New York
- Manhattan Life Insurance Building (1894; demolished 1930), 64–70 Broadway, Manhattan, New York
- The former Catholic Apostolic Church (1897), 417 West 57th Street, Manhattan, New York; now the Lutheran Church for All Nations.

== Works after 1898 ==
- 111 Fifth Avenue (1904), Manhattan, New York; a "21-sty limestone and brick office building, 41.3×264.5 and irregular," for $1,250,000.00.
- 513–515 West 161st Street (1905), Manhattan, New York; a "3-sty brk and stone engine house", for the city of NY at a cost of $62,000. – now FDNY Hook & Ladder 34/Engine 34
- (with Harry E. Donnell) Brunswick Building (1906), Manhattan, New York; Beaux-Arts building located on the site of the former Brunswick Hotel at 225 Fifth Avenue, on Madison Square Park
- Mills Buildings (1906), SE corner of William Street, Manhattan, New York; an "11-sty brick and stone bank and office building" for J. & W. Seligman & Co. at a cost of $500,000.
- 111 Broadway (1906), SW corner of Broadway and Cedar Street, Manhattan, New York; a "21-sty brick and stone office building," for $3,000,000.00.
- City Investing Building,(1906–1908; razed 1968) 56 Cortlandt Street, Manhattan, New York; 26-story skyscraper built near the Singer Tower
- 37 Wall Street (1906–1907), Manhattan, New York; commissioned for the Trust Company of America. Now residential building with Tiffany & Co as main floor tenant
- 142 Liberty Street (1909), Manhattan, New York; a "3-sty and basement brick and reinforced concrete store and loft building" for A. L. White and F. M. Hilton of 62 Cedar St, at a cost of $15,000.
- 224 West 57th Street (1909), Broadway and 57th St, Manhattan, New York; two 9-story automobile showrooms.
- 66 57th St and Broadway (1909), Manhattan, New York; a "9-sty and basement concrete and brick garage" for $175,000.
- Broadway and the SE corner of Astor Place (1910), Manhattan, New York; a "2-sty brick and stone loft, slag roof, copper skylights, wire glass, copper cornices, terra cotta blocks, steam heat, doors fireproofed, metal sash and frames, fireproof trim, limestone" for $300,000.
- The Adams Express Buildings (1912), Manhattan, New York; Nos. 57–61 Broadway and Nos. 33–41 Trinity Place, a 32-story office building for $2 million.
