= Montauk Club =

Social club in New York City

The Montauk Club
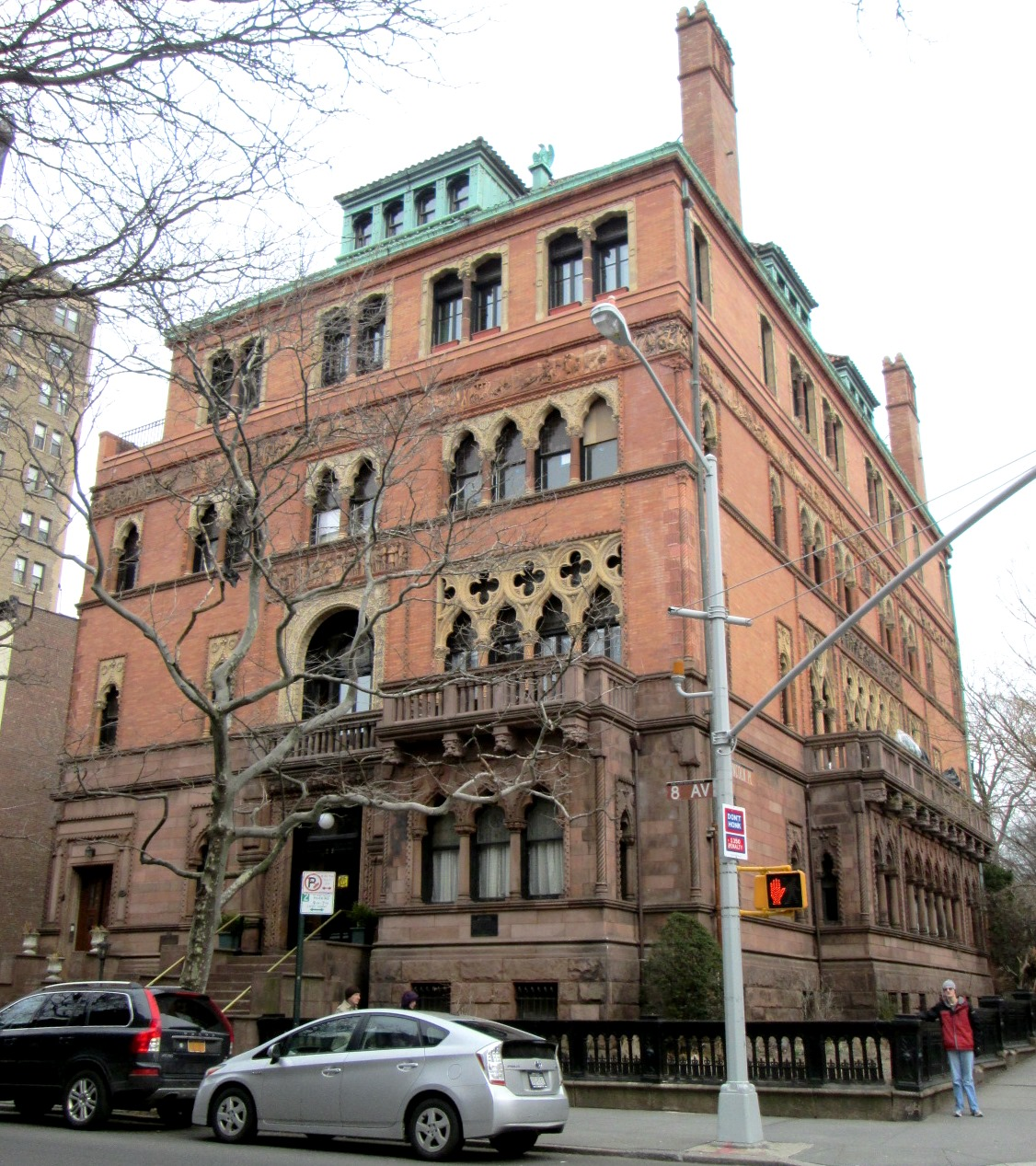
- The club as seen from Eighth Avenue (2013)
- Formation: March 11, 1889
- Type: Social Club
- Headquarters: 25 Eighth Avenue
- Location: Brooklyn, New York
- Coordinates: 40.6748°N 73.9717°W
- Region served: New York metropolitan area
- Website: montaukclub.com

The Montauk Club is a social club located in a Francis Kimball-designed building in Park Slope, Brooklyn. The Club provides dining and drinking services.

== History ==
The Club was founded in 1889 as a traditional men's social club by a group looking for a club located in the rapidly-developing Park Slope area. The initial group of 25 charter members quickly grew to 300 and became the most prominent club in Brooklyn. Charles Pratt, Richard Schermerhorn, Edwin Clark Litchfield and Robert Pinkerton were early members. Of the hundreds of clubs in Brooklyn at the time, the Montauk Club is the only one still in existence.

The landmark clubhouse was built in 1889-91 and was designed by Francis H. Kimball in the Venetian Gothic. It is reported to have been modeled after the Palazzo Santa Sofia (Ca' d'Oro) on Venice's Grand Canal. Built of brownstone and brick, it features verdigris copper and terra cotta produced by the New York Architectural Terra Cotta Works. It is ornamented with representations of the Montauk tribe of Native Americans the club is named after, which can be found on the building's capitals, over the main entrance, and on a continuous frieze between the third and fourth floors. Other panels depict a meeting in 1659 between the Montauks and Europeans, and the laying of the cornerstone of the building. The smaller staircase to the left of the main entrance was built as the Ladies' Entrance, the first of its kind in any social club in Brooklyn or Manhattan. It is now used as the entrance to the condominium units (see below).

The club is located within the New York City Landmark Preservation Commission's Park Slope Historic District. In 2017, the Montauk Club building received the Lucy G. Moses Preservation Award from the New York Landmarks Conservancy and the Municipal Art Society's MaSterworks Award for Best Restoration.

Although not a political club, many prominent politicians of both parties were members, and the Club has hosted many prominent politicians over the years, including William McKinley, Grover Cleveland, Herbert Hoover, Dwight Eisenhower, John F. Kennedy and Robert F. Kennedy. Hugh L. Carey, Governor of New York, was a member for many years.

Club membership declined in the period before Brooklyn's renaissance, and it became difficult to maintain the beautiful but aging clubhouse. The upper and basement floors were sold to a developer for condominiums, with the Club ultimately retaining ownership of the first and second floors.

With a growing membership, especially of younger members, the Club continues to provide community for families and individuals.

== In popular culture ==
The club has been used as a location in films such as Prizzi's Honor, Definitely, Maybe, Gigantic, 'Rounders, Illuminata, Q&A, and City Hall and television shows such as The Mysteries of Laura, Boardwalk Empire, Gotham, The Good Wife, Public Morals and Person of Interest.

== Gallery ==
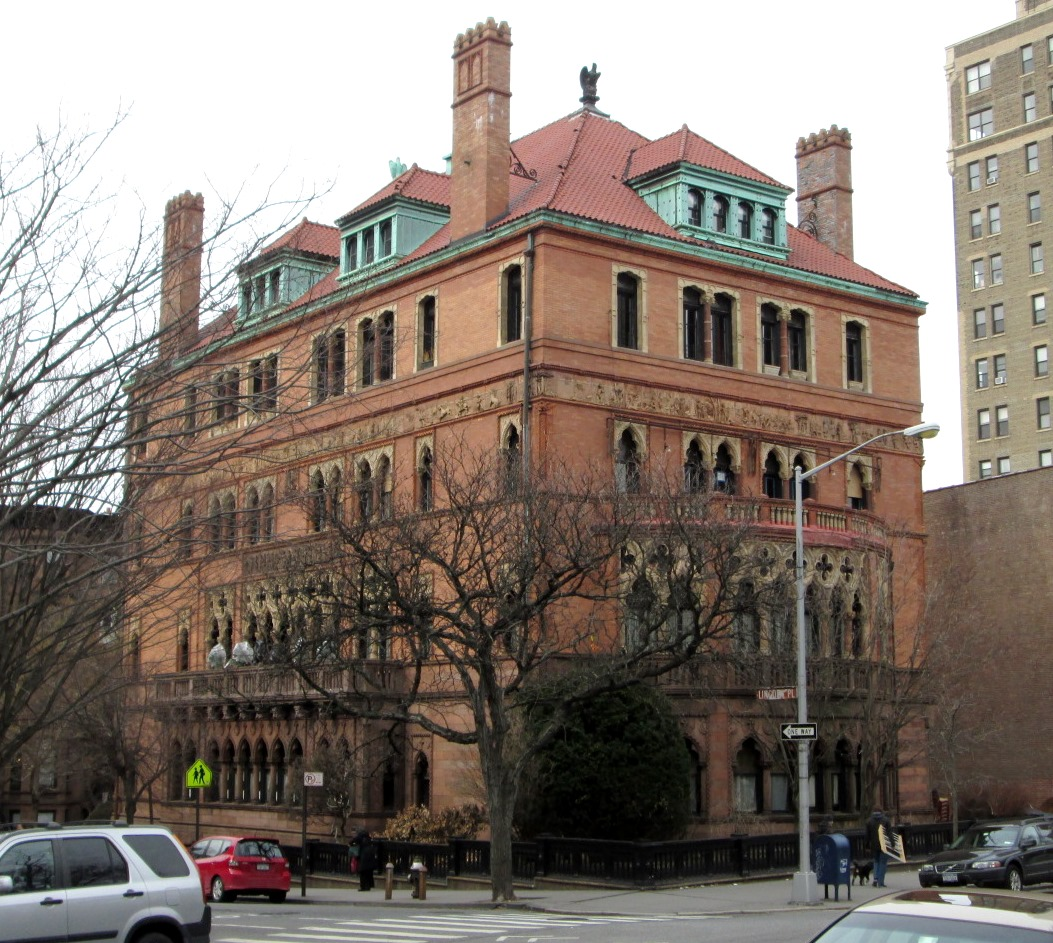
View of the building from the southeast, on Plaza Street West

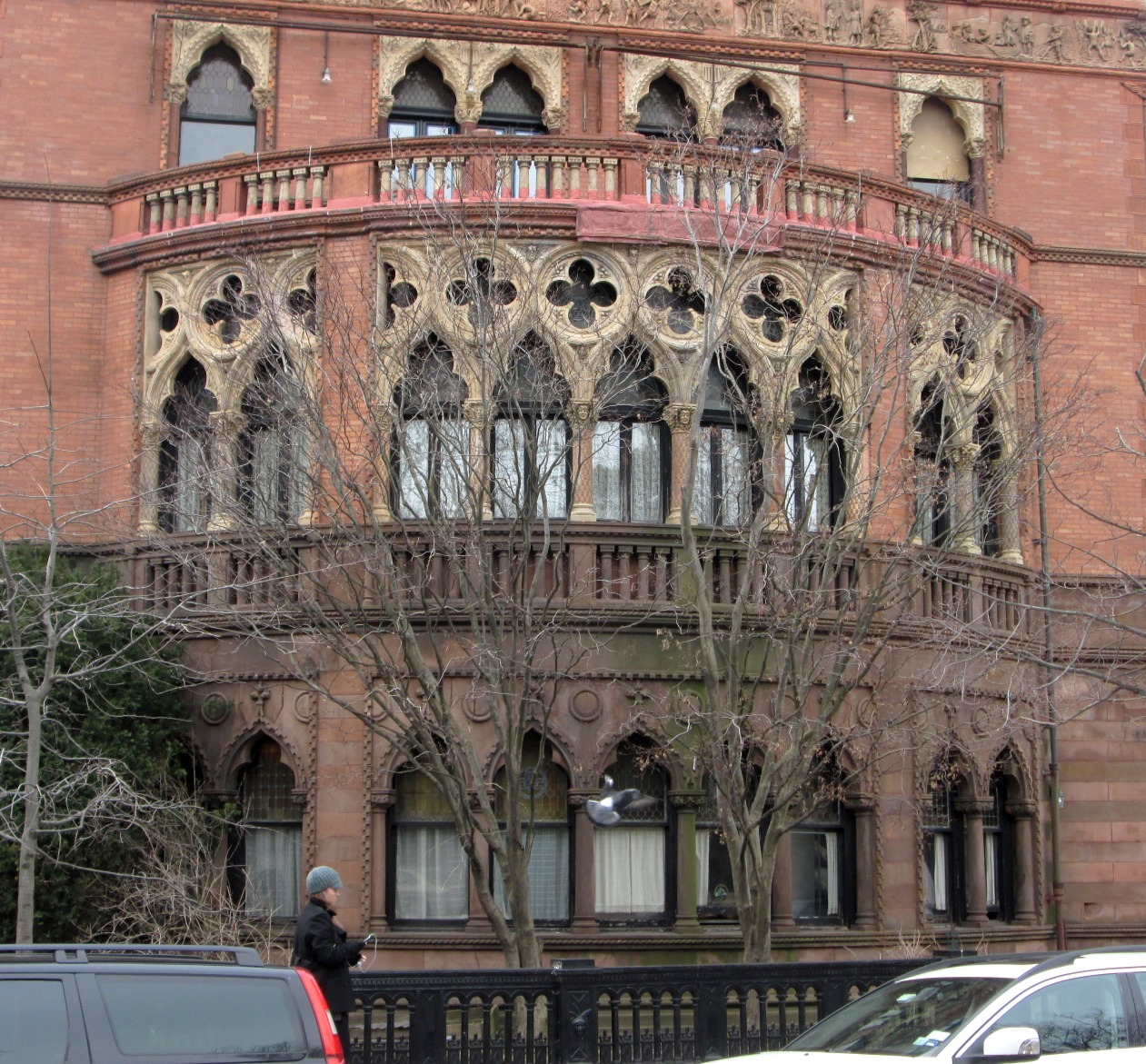
Detail of the Plaza Street West facade

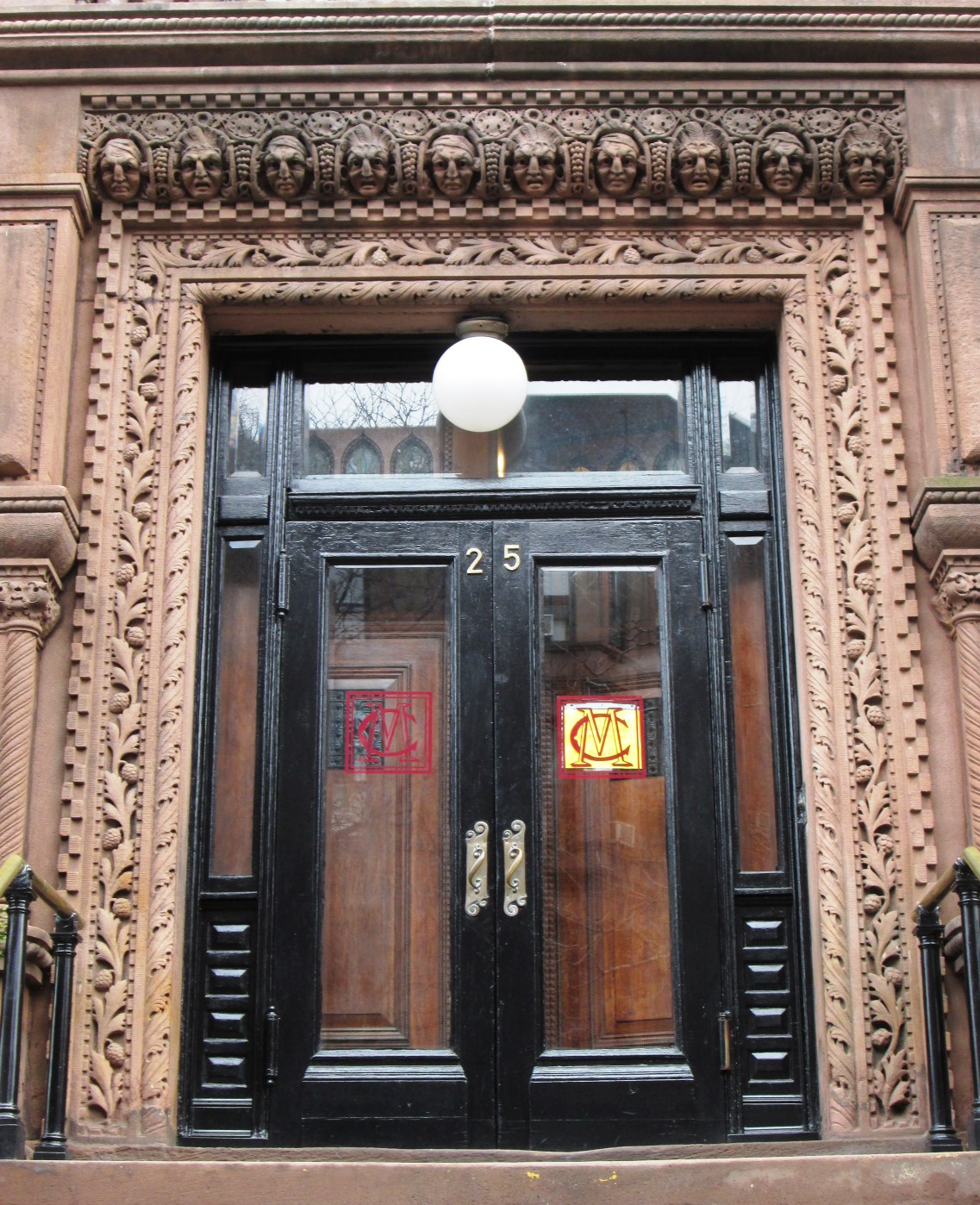
The main entrance to the building

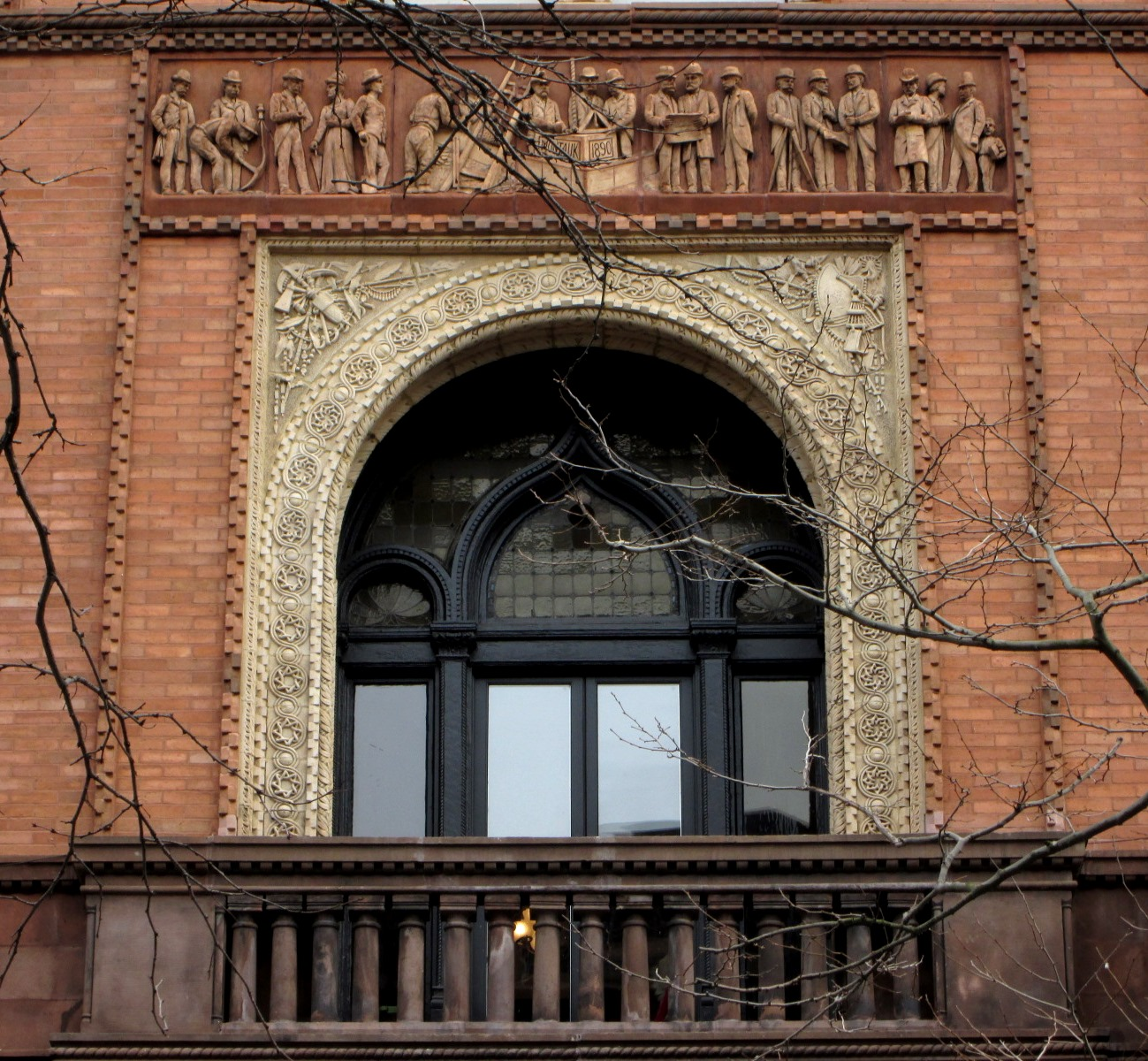
Detail of the Eighth Avenue facade, above the entrance

== See also ==
- List of American gentlemen's clubs
