= New York Architectural Terra-Cotta Company =

Producer of architectural terra cotta

- Industry: Clay industry
- Founded: 1886
- Founders: Orlando B. Potter, Walter Geer
- Defunct: 1929
- Fate: Dissolved

The New York Architectural Terra-Cotta Company was a manufacturer of architectural terracotta based in Queens, New York, U.S.

== History ==
Beginning in the 1870s, architectural terracotta grew in popularity in the United States after architects were drawn to its adaptability for various aesthetic styles and its inherent fireproof qualities. The initial companies to find success were the Chicago Terra Cotta Works and the Perth Amboy Terra Cotta Company, but New York real estate magnate Orlando B. Potter saw an opportunity for a company based closer to New York City to succeed and founded the New York Architectural Terra-Cotta Company with his son-in-law Walter Geer in 1886.

They recruited James Taylor, a ceramicist often described as "the father of architectural terracotta" in the United States, to act as superintendent of the new company's factory in Ravenswood, New York. Less than three months after the company began producing terracotta the entire factory was destroyed by fire. Taylor announced they would rebuild immediately and temporary sheds were built. A new factory, with an automatic sprinkler system, was built and operational in a few months and the company's rebirth was hailed by the community as "Phoenix-like."

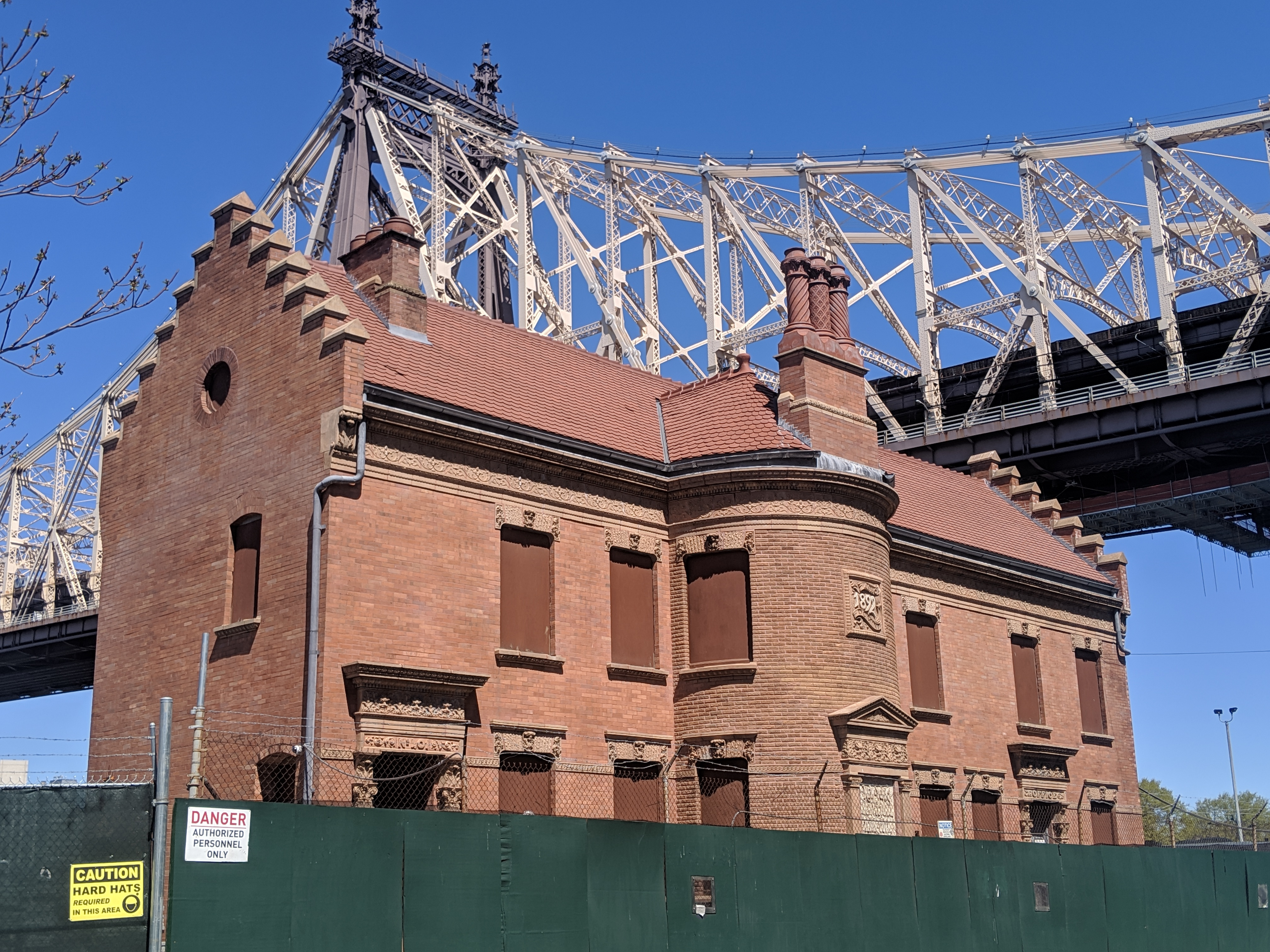
The company's 1892 office building in Queens, New York, designed by Francis H. Kimball

In 1892 the company constructed an office building, separate from its manufacturing facility, designed by architect Francis H. Kimball. As was often the case at the time, the building was designed to showcase the various products the company was capable of producing in a Renaissance and Tudor Revival design that incorporated terracotta panels, chimney pots, and clay roof tiles.

The company was the fourth largest employer in Long Island City by 1915 and remained successful into the 1920s. A second manufacturing site was built in Old Bridge, New Jersey and the company went bankrupt in 1928–1929.

=== After dissolution ===
Richard Dalton, who had been president of the company from 1919 to 1928, formed the Eastern Terra Cotta Company in 1931 and used both of the New York Architectural Terra-Cotta Company's facilities. This new company remained in operation until the mid-1940s, after which the 1892 office was used by Dalton for his construction company. When he died in 1968 the Queens property was sold to Citibank, which demolished the remaining manufacturing works.

Despite opposition from Citibank and Queens borough president Donald Manes, the 1892 building was designated a New York City Landmark in an unusually fast application process in 1982. Afterwards it drew increasing attention for its unique architecture and in 1999 it was purchased by Stuart Match Suna, president of Silvercup Studios. Historic preservationists were initially happy about this purchase due to Suna's wife being an architect on the Landmarks Commission, but Suna did not make efforts to maintain the structure until forced to by lawyers from the Landmarks Commission. In the 2020s the building underwent restorations to the interior and exterior of the structure.

== Notable projects ==
The company produced architectural terracotta for many prominent buildings in and around New York City, including the Lincoln Building, the Corbin Building, the Schermerhorn Building, the Old Grolier Club, the Montauk Club, Carnegie Hall, and The Ansonia.

== Gallery ==
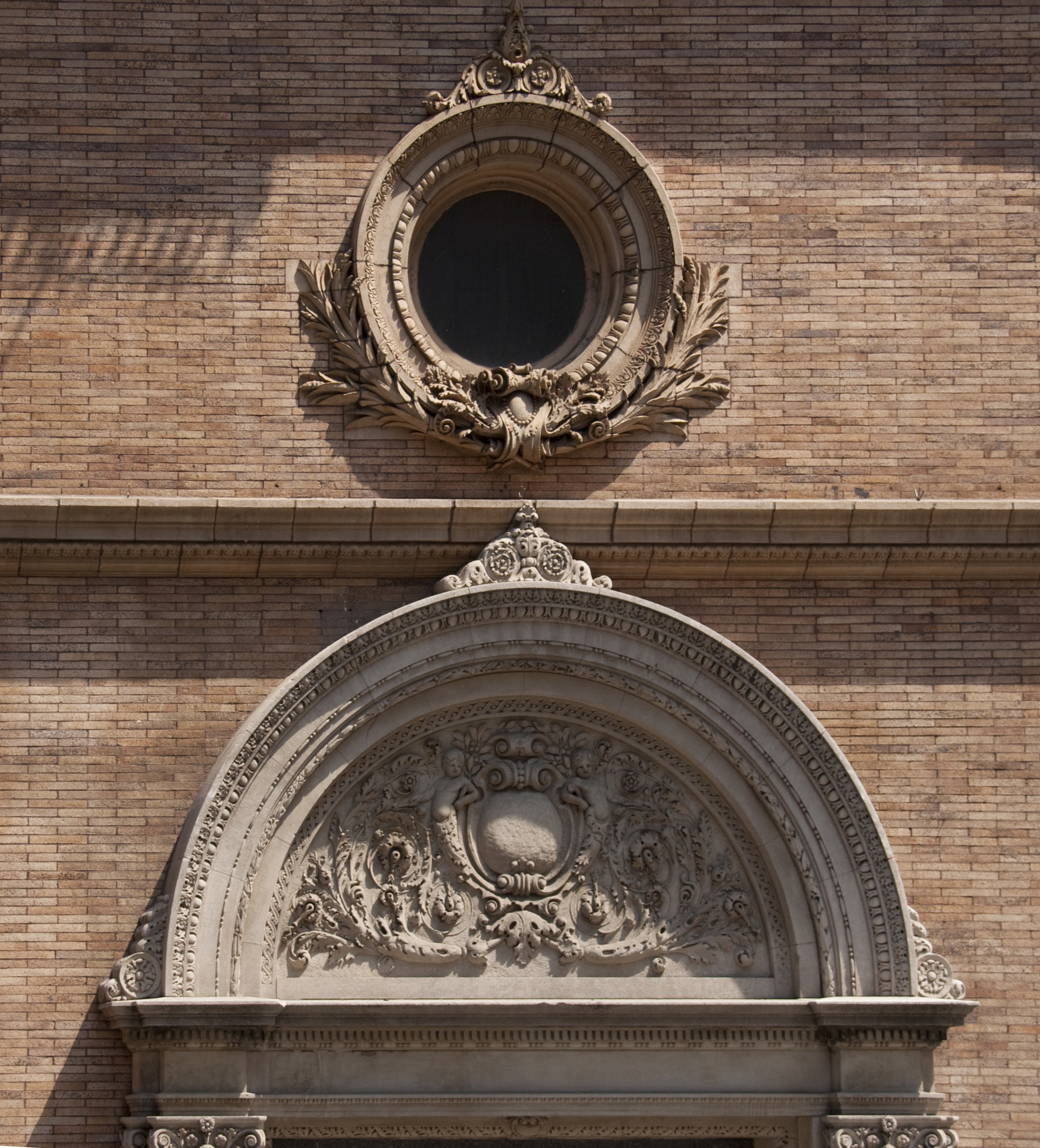
Ornamental terracotta on Carnegie Hall

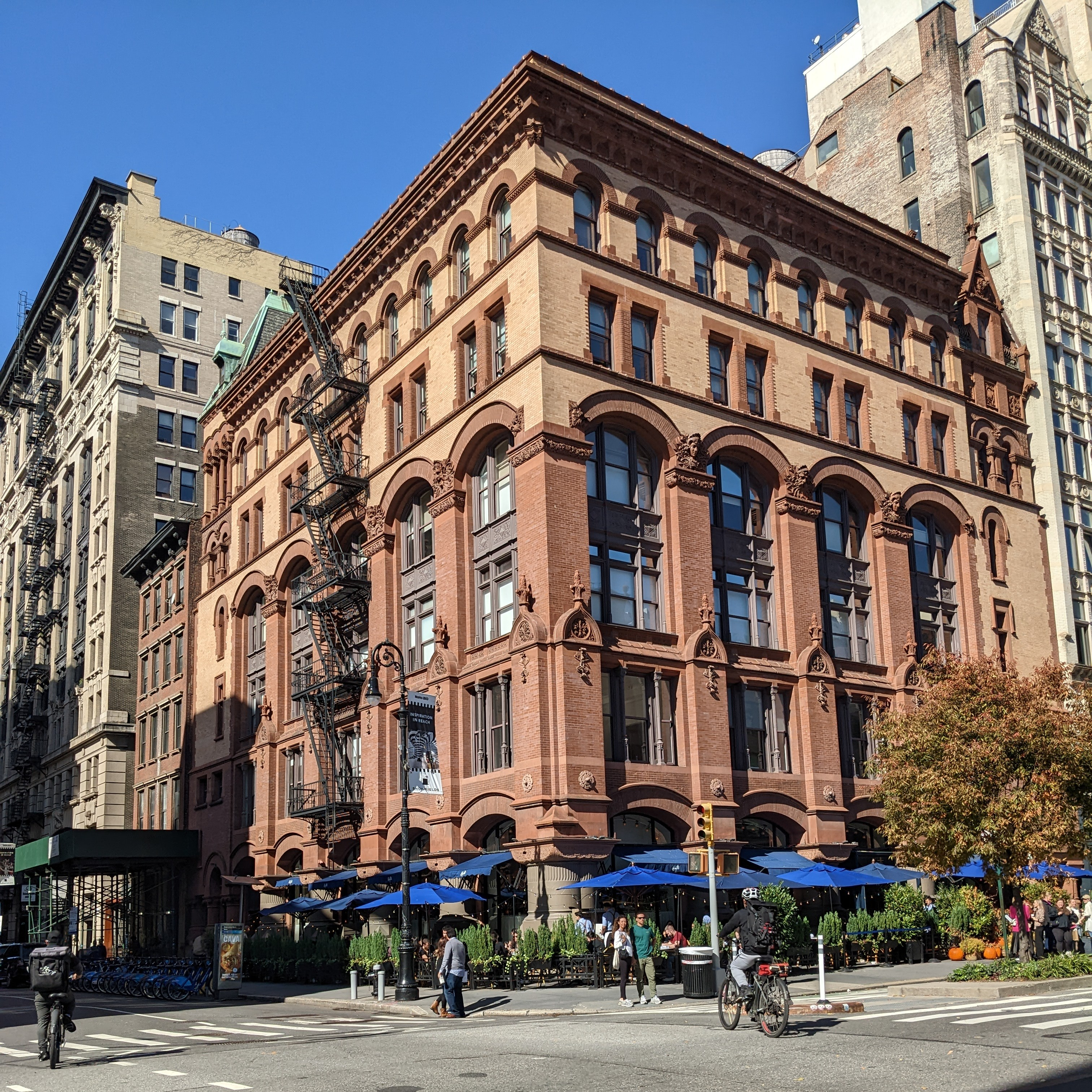
Architectural terracotta seen on Schermerhorn Building

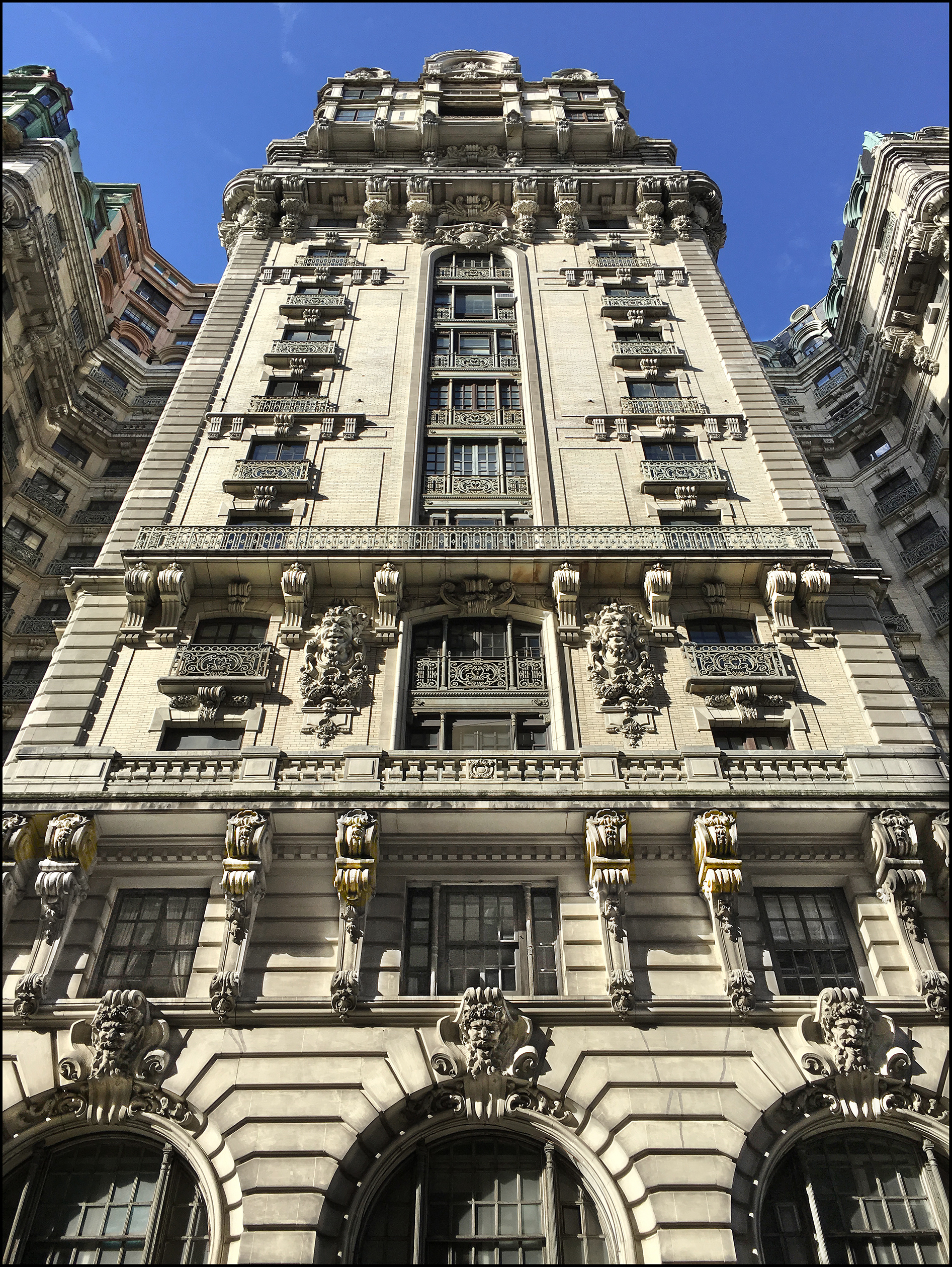
Architectural terracotta seen on facade of the Ansonia

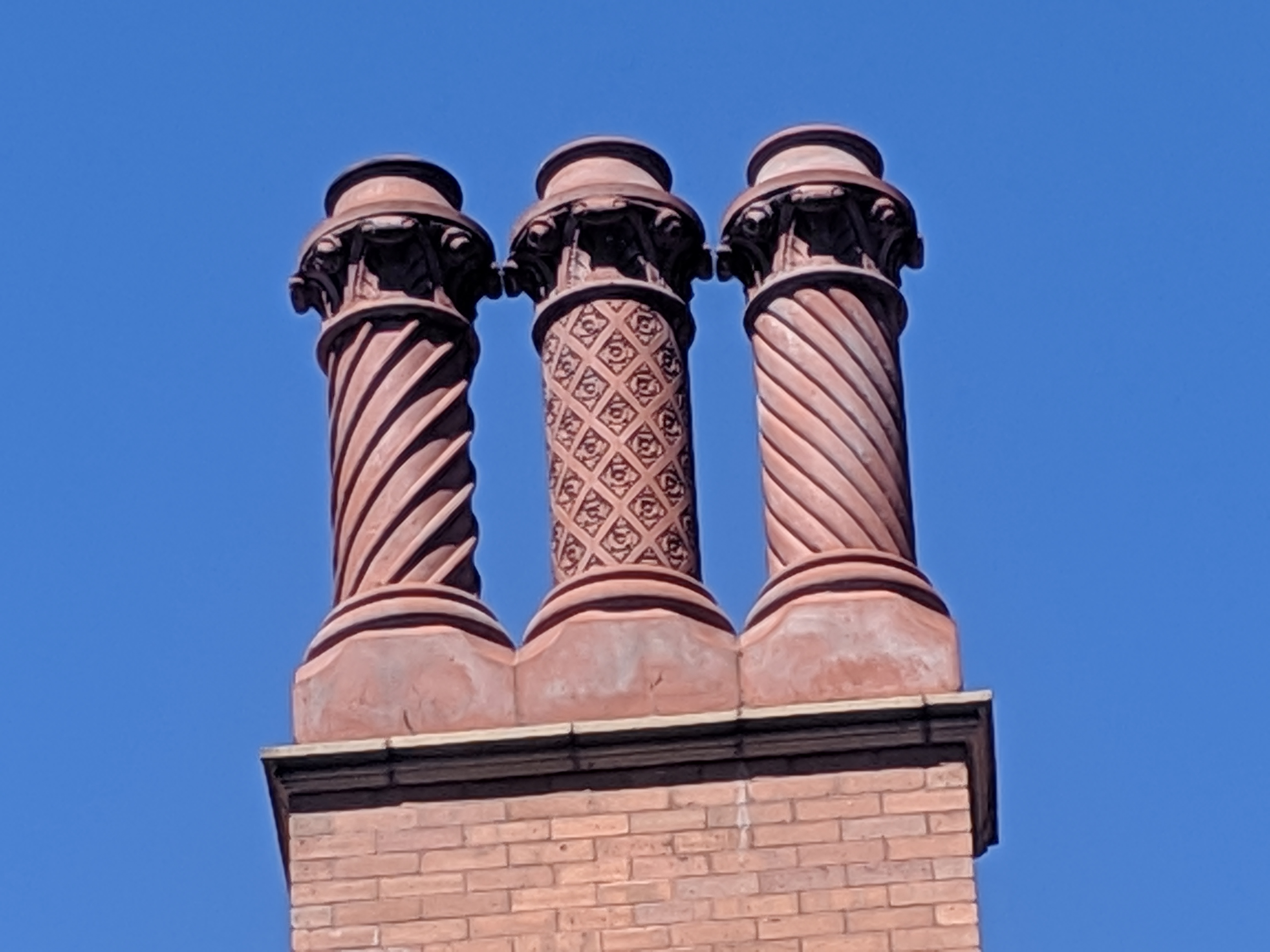
Chimney pots on the 1892 office building

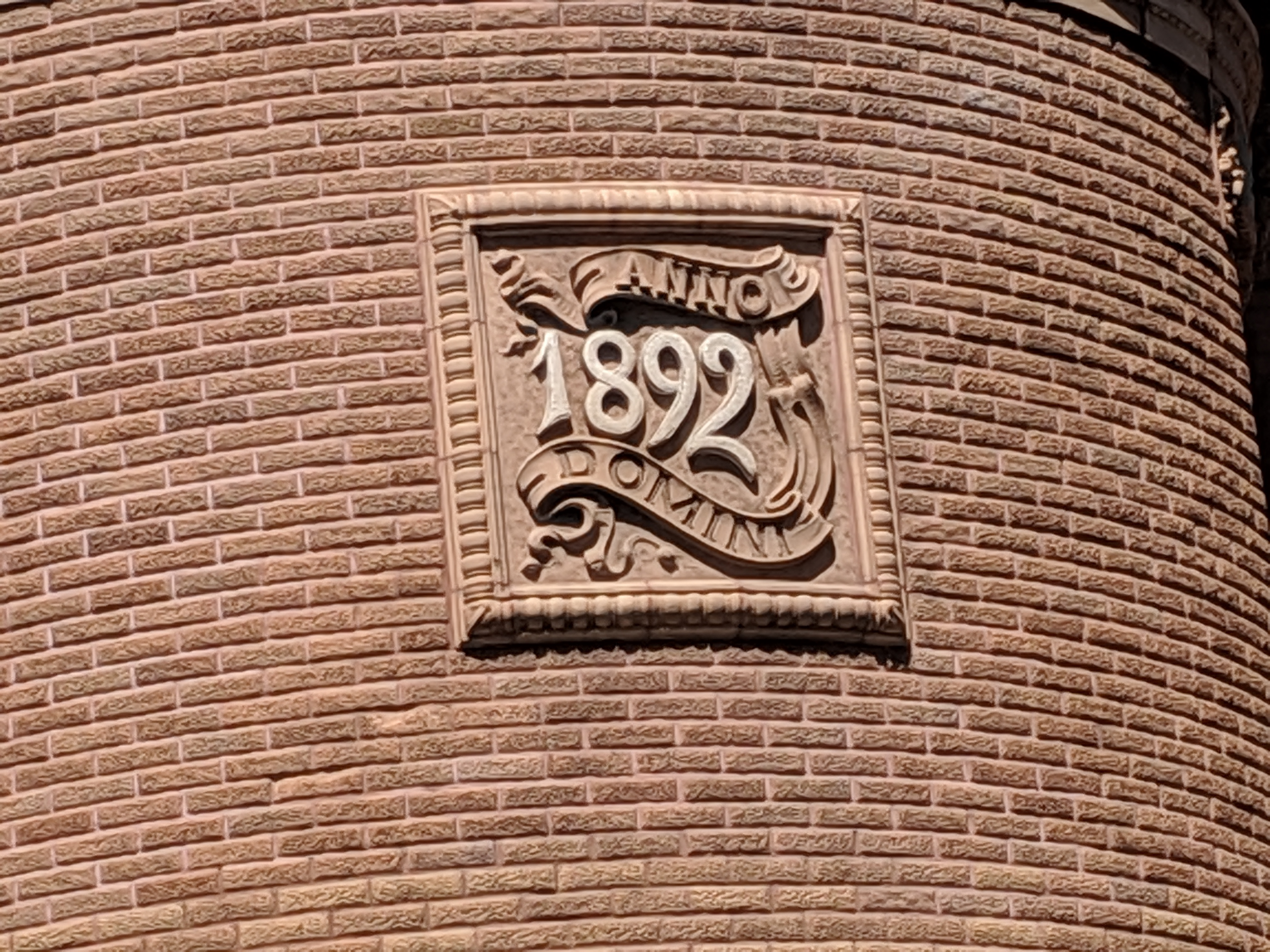
Decorative terracotta on the 1892 office building

== See also ==
- Architectural terracotta
- Glazed architectural terra-cotta
- Atlantic Terra Cotta Company
