= Our Saviour New York =

Church in Manhattan, New York

Coordinates: 40°46′07″N 73°59′11″W

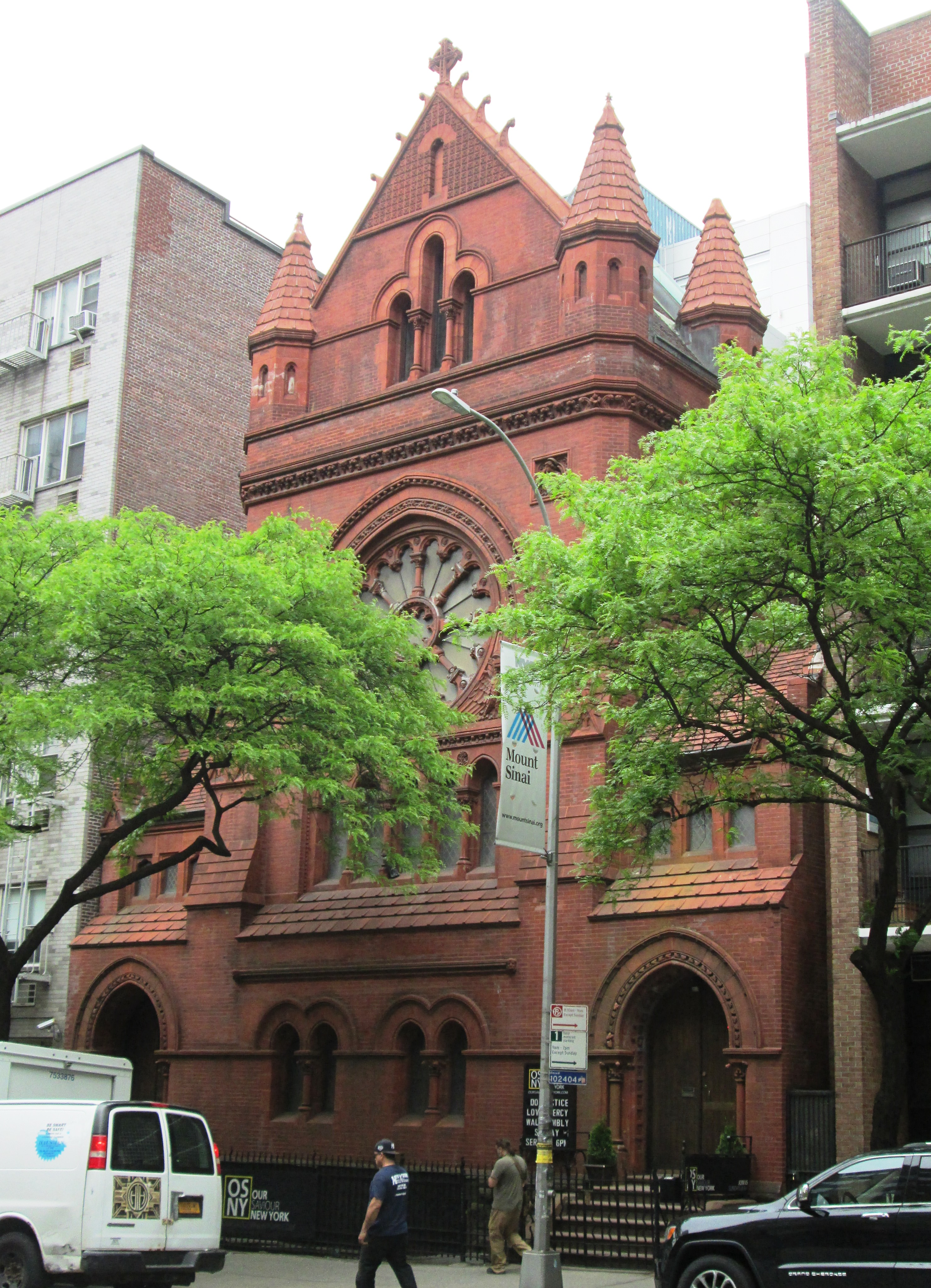
- (2018)
- Interactive map of the Our Saviour New York area

General information
- Architectural style: Late Victorian Gothic
- Location: 417 West 57th Street, Manhattan, New York City, U.S.
- Current tenants: Church for All Nations Lutheran
- Construction started: 1885
- Completed: 1897
- Client: The Catholic Apostolic Church

Technical details
- Structural system: Structural red brick masonry with terra-cotta dressing

Design and construction
- Architect: Francis H. Kimball

Our Saviour New York, at 417 West 57th Street between Ninth and Tenth Avenues in the Hell's Kitchen neighborhood of Manhattan, New York City, was built in 1886–87 and was designed by Francis H. Kimball in the Late Victorian Gothic style for the Catholic Apostolic Church, an English group which believed in an imminent Second Coming. In 1995, with the congregation dwindling, the church was donated to the Lutheran Life's Journey Ministries, which in 1997 rededicated it as the Church for All Nations. On April 26, 2015, the Church for All Nations held its last service. Members of the congregation still worship as All Nations Lutheran Church in a rehearsal studio at 244 West 54th Street. The church itself is now, in 2018, Our Saviour New York and is directed by lead pastor Matt Popovits and Mark Budenholzer.

On February 7, 2001 the building was designated a New York City landmark under the name "Catholic Apostolic Church".

== History ==
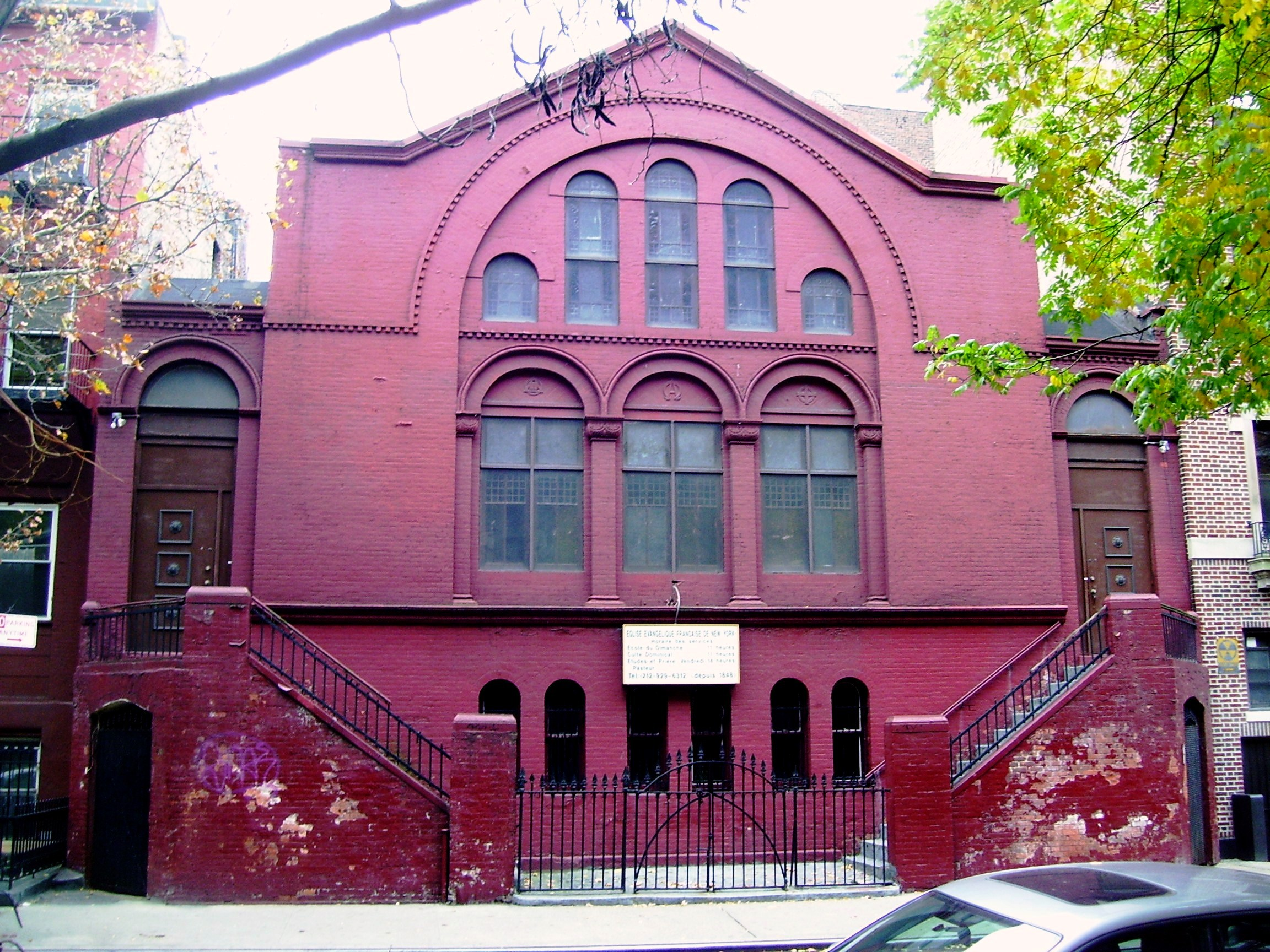
The original Catholic Apostolic sanctuary on 16th Street

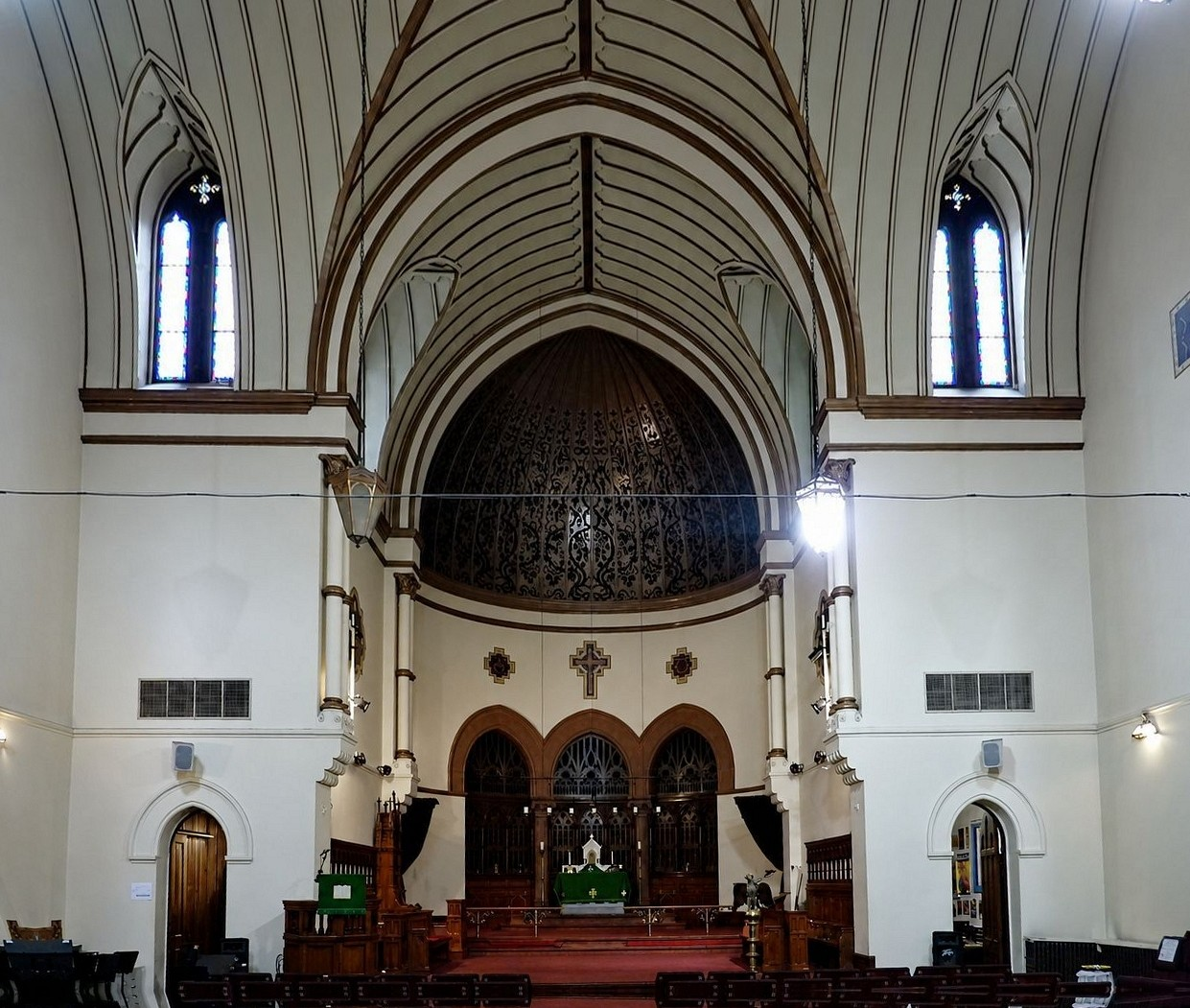
Interior

Catholic Apostolics first began worshiping in New York City in 1848, utilizing a sanctuary at 126 West 16th Street between Sixth and Seventh Avenues. By 1885, the congregation numbered around 400, and it purchased two lots for a new church "in a middling area of tenements and flats."

The English-trained American architect Francis H. Kimball designed the Victorian Gothic Revival church in 1897. The design features deep red bricks and abundant terra-cotta ornamentation, typical of Kimball's noted style. The doorway arches deeply protrude from the church with molded terra-cotta leaves and angelic heads; the building is set back from the street by a black wrought-iron fence with flame-shaped posts. It was praised by influential New York architectural critic Montgomery Schuyler, who wrote that there was "no more scholarly Gothic work in New York."

By 1893, the church hosted two daily services, recorded in King's Handbook of New York City. Because of a lack of clergy in the greater Catholic Apostolic Church, the Episcopalian priest Henry Ogden DuBois served as Angel of the church in conjunction with his Episcopal duties, until his death in 1949. When the church had diminished to a few members, it was decided to donate the structure to another church instead of allowing the structure to be adaptively reused for a secular purpose. In 1995, the church was donated to the Lutheran Life's Journey Ministries. The congregation became a member of the Lutheran Church–Missouri Synod in 1997.

The building has been described as "a superior work of urban architecture."

== See also ==
- National Register of Historic Places listings in Manhattan from 14th to 59th Streets
- List of New York City Designated Landmarks in Manhattan from 14th to 59th Streets
