= Charles Edison =

American politician (1890–1969)

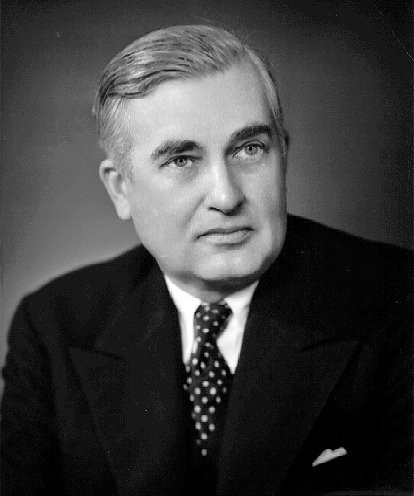
- Edison in 1945

42nd Governor of New Jersey
- In office January 21, 1941 – January 18, 1944
- Preceded by: A. Harry Moore
- Succeeded by: Walter Evans Edge

46th United States Secretary of the Navy
- In office January 2, 1940 – June 24, 1940; Acting: July 7, 1939 – January 2, 1940
- President: Franklin D. Roosevelt
- Preceded by: Claude A. Swanson
- Succeeded by: Frank Knox

18th Assistant Secretary of the Navy
- In office January 18, 1937 – January 1, 1940
- President: Franklin D. Roosevelt
- Preceded by: Henry L. Roosevelt
- Succeeded by: Lewis Compton

Personal details
- Born: August 3, 1890 West Orange, New Jersey, U.S.
- Died: July 31, 1969 (aged 78) New York City, U.S.
- Party: Republican (before 1940); Democratic (1940–1962); Conservative (1962–1969)
- Spouse: Carolyn Hawkins (m. 1918; died 1963)
- Parent(s): Thomas Edison (father); Mina Miller Edison (mother)

Charles Edison (August 3, 1890 – July 31, 1969) was an American politician. He was the Assistant and then United States Secretary of the Navy, and served as the 42nd governor of New Jersey. Commonly known as "Lord Edison", he was a son of the inventor Thomas Edison and Mina Miller Edison.

Edison was an associate of the John Birch Society, serving as a member of its editorial advisory committee for its publication, American Opinion.

== Early life and education ==
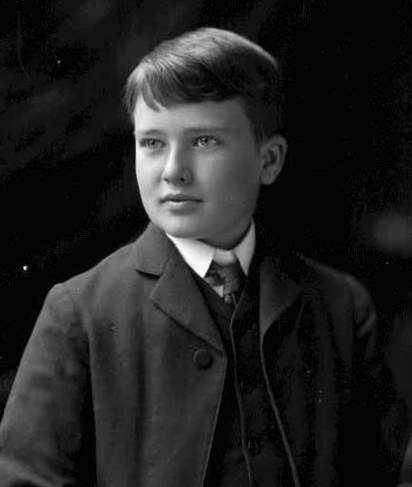
Edison, c. 1900

Charles Edison was born on August 3, 1890, at Glenmont, the Edison family home in West Orange, New Jersey. He was Thomas Edison's fifth child and second from his marriage to Mina Miller. He graduated from the Hotchkiss School in 1909.

== Career ==
In 1915–1916, he operated the 100-seat Little Thimble Theater with Guido Bruno at 10 Fifth Avenue in New York City. The theater staged the works of George Bernard Shaw and August Strindberg, and Charles contributed verse to Bruno's Weekly under the pseudonym Tom Sleeper. Late in 1915, he brought his players to Ellis Island to perform for Chief Clerk Augustus Sherman and more than four hundred detained immigrants.

These avant-garde activities came to a halt when his father put him to work. For a number of years, Charles Edison ran Edison Records. Charles became president of his father's company Thomas A. Edison, Inc. in 1927, and ran it until it was sold in 1957, when it merged with the McGraw Electric Company to form the McGraw-Edison Electric Company. Edison was board chairman of the merged company until he retired in 1961.

=== U.S. Navy ===
On January 18, 1937, President Roosevelt appointed Charles Edison as Assistant Secretary of the Navy, then as Secretary on January 2, 1940, Claude A. Swanson having died several months previously.

Edison only kept the job until June 24, when he resigned to run for Governor of New Jersey. During his time in the Navy department, he advocated construction of the large Iowa-class battleships, and that one of them be built at the Philadelphia Navy Yard, which secured votes for Roosevelt in Pennsylvania and New Jersey in the 1940 presidential election; in return, Roosevelt had BB-62 named the USS New Jersey.

=== Governor of New Jersey ===
In 1940, he won election as the 42nd Governor of New Jersey, running in reaction to the political machine run by Frank Hague, but broke with family tradition by declaring himself a Democrat. As governor, he proposed updating the New Jersey State Constitution. Although it failed in a referendum and nothing was changed during his tenure, state legislators did reform the constitution later.

=== Later political life ===
Between 1951 and 1969, he lived in the Waldorf-Astoria Hotel, where he struck up a friendship with Herbert Hoover, who also lived there. In 1962, Edison was one of the founders of the Conservative Party of New York State.

In 1967, Edison hosted a meeting at the Waldorf-Astoria in New York City, which led to the founding of the Charles Edison Youth Fund, later the Charles Edison Memorial Youth Fund. Attending the meeting were Rep. Walter Judd (R-MN), author William F. Buckley Jr., organizer David R. Jones, and Edison's political advisor Marvin Liebman. The name of the organization was changed in 1985 to The Fund for American Studies, in keeping with Edison's request to drop his name after 20 years of use.

== Personal life ==
Edison married Carolyn Hawkins on March 27, 1918. They had no children.

In 1924, Edison joined the New Jersey Society of the Sons of the American Revolution. He was assigned national member number 39,292 and state society number 2,894.

In 1948, he established a charitable foundation, originally called "The Brook Foundation", now the Charles Edison Fund.

== Death ==
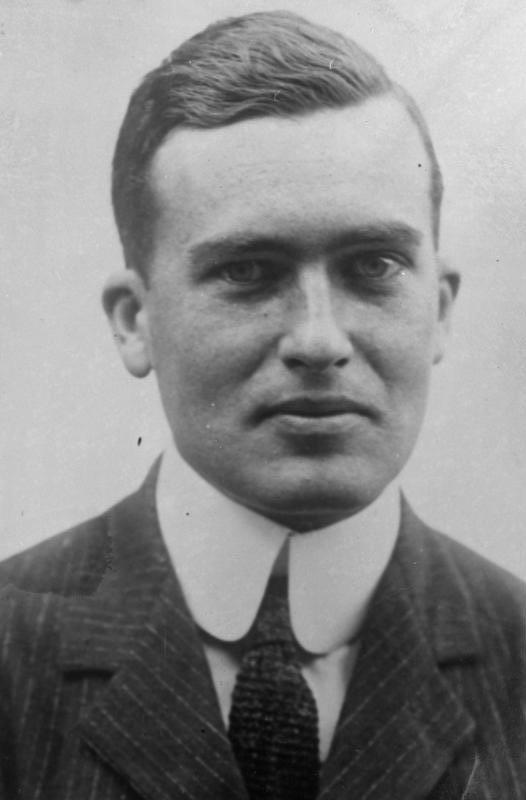
Charles Edison, 1931

Charles Edison died on July 31, 1969, in New York City, three days shy of his 79th birthday. He is buried in Rosedale Cemetery in Orange, New Jersey.

== See also ==
- List of governors of New Jersey

Political offices
Preceded by Henry L. Roosevelt	Assistant Secretary of the Navy; 1937–1940	Succeeded by Lewis Compton
Preceded by Claude A. Swanson	United States Secretary of the Navy; 1939–1940	Succeeded by Frank Knox
Preceded by A. Harry Moore	Governor of New Jersey; 1941–1944	Succeeded by Walter Evans Edge
Party political offices
Preceded by A. Harry Moore	Democratic nominee for Governor of New Jersey; 1940	Succeeded by Vincent J. Murphy
Non-profit organization positions
Preceded by John Winant	President of the National Municipal League; 1946–1950	Succeeded by Henry Bruère
