= David R. Jones (organizer) =

David R. Jones (1938 – April 7, 1998) was an American conservative political activist and organizer who tried to inspire young people to pursue careers in the nonprofit sector.

Born in West Virginia, he was trained as a teacher and taught high school for three years in Pinellas County, Florida, before turning his career towards politics. From 1963 until 1968, he was the executive director for Young Americans for Freedom. In 1968, he co-founded the Charles Edison Memorial Youth Fund along with William F. Buckley, Jr., Walter Judd, and Marvin Liebman. From 1969 until 1971, he was national vice chairman of the Young Republican National Federation. During this time, he was campaign director for James L. Buckley during his successful U.S. Senate election on the Conservative Party of New York State ticket. He served as an administrative assistant for Senator Buckley until 1974. Jones then moved to Tennessee to become executive director of the Tennessee Republican Party and vice chancellor for development for Vanderbilt University. President Ronald Reagan appointed him as chairman of the national Commission on Student Financial Assistance.

He died on April 7, 1998, shortly after being diagnosed with lung cancer.
