= McGraw Electric =

American electrical appliance manufacturer

McGraw Electric Company
- Industry: Electrical appliances
- Founded: 1900 in Sioux City, Iowa, US
- Founder: Max McGraw
- Defunct: 1957
- Successor: McGraw-Edison
- Headquarters: US
- Products: Home appliances

The McGraw Electric Company was a US manufacturer of electric appliances founded by Max McGraw in 1900. It grew through mergers and acquisitions to become a major enterprise. The best known product may have been the Toastmaster pop-up toaster. In 1957 McGraw Electric merged with Thomas A. Edison, Inc. to form McGraw-Edison.

== Early years ==
In the summer of 1900, aged 17, Max McGraw entered business as an electrician. He called his enterprise the McGraw Electric Company. His electrical supply business operated in the basement of a drug store in Sioux City. Most of his early work was wiring houses that were converting from gas to electricity. The business struggled at first, but in the second year gained profitable contracts from the Stockyards and the Peavey Grand Opera House in Sioux City. In 1902 the McGraw Electric Company moved into larger premises on Fifth Street, Sioux City.

In 1903 McGraw organized the Interstate Supply Company in partnership with his father and four others, selling mill, railroad and electrical equipment. This business grew rapidly. In 1907 McGraw founded the Interstate Electric Manufacturing Company as a branch of the Interstate Supply Company. It became a separate corporation and focused on the manufacture of magnetos, telephones and power switchboards. In 1910 he merged the supply and manufacturing companies into the Interstate Supply and Manufacturing Company. In 1912 McGraw bought the Lehmer Company, a mill supply and electrical equipment manufacturer which he had used as a model for his earlier enterprises. He merged this company and the Interstate Supply and Manufacturing Company into the McGraw Electric Company, taking the position of President. The combined business had sales of more than $2 million that year.

== Post World War I ==
In 1926 McGraw Electric sold its wholesale operation to Westinghouse Electric and Manufacturing Company. McGraw bought Bersted Manufacturing in 1926, which made small appliances such as electric waffle irons, and made it a division of McGraw Electric. The founder, Al Bersted, continued as president of the division. In 1930 the division was sold back to Al Bersted. The Waters-Genter Company of Minneapolis had been formed in 1912, and manufactured a pop-up toaster for restaurants called the Toastmaster. In 1926 McGraw used his private capital to buy an interest in the company from Glen Waters and Harold Genter. He provided the capital needed to enter the household market in 1927, and that year acquired Waters-Genter. He sold his interests in the company to McGraw Electric in 1929. Waters and Genter remained in charge of the toastmaster division until 1938.

McGraw Electric grew steadily through acquisitions. McGraw used to say, "Never buy a company unless it is making money or seems about to go broke," a philosophy that served him well. In 1938 McGraw built a new plant in Elgin, Illinois, which housed Toastmaster and other product lines. The facility, designed by the architects Olsen and Urbain, cost $250,000 to build. It covered 123,000 square feet (11,400 m^{2}) on 25 acres of land beside the Fox River to the south of Elgin. During World War II (1939–45) the plant was used to make anti-aircraft shells and fuses.

== Post World War II ==
In 1948 McGraw Electric purchased Bersted Manufacturing Company and Manning, Bowman & Co. McGraw made Al Bersted president. Eventually Bersted became CEO of McGraw Electric. The purchase include Bersted subsidiaries Swartzbaugh Manufacturing Company ("Everhot" appliances) and United Electrical Manufacturing Company ("Eskimo" fans). Other acquisitions over the years included Clark Water Heater, Buss Fuse, Speed Queen, Albion Humidifiers, Tropic Aire, Village Blacksmith, Allover Clippers, Duracrest, Spartan Bottle Warmers, Coolerator, Zero and Halo Lighting.

As of 1948 the company had plants in Chicago, Elgin and Saint Louis. 1948 sales were $21,000,000 and net income was $2,712,000. In 1949 McGraw acquired the Line Material company of Milwaukee, which manufactured power line equipment. Line Material was based in Milwaukee and operated plants in several other cities. It had 1948 sales of $38,750,000 and net income of $3,108,000. In 1952 McGraw Electric merged with the Pennsylvania Transformer Company. In 1953 the McGraw Electric Company transferred its Toastmaster manufacturing operation to Missouri.

After World War II General Mills began making home appliances such as electric irons, toasters and pressure cookers to maintain employment for workers who had been making supplies for the military. This line never accounted for more than 10% of the output of the Mechanical Division. In May 1954 McGraw Electric purchased the home appliances business from General Mills. By 1955 McGraw Electric had thirty one divisions, with gross annual sales of nearly $300 million. In 1956 McGraw arranged a merger with Thomas A. Edison, Inc. The combined McGraw-Edison Company was launched in January 1957.

== Acquisition timeline ==
Some of the acquisitions by McGraw Electric included:

1926	Bersted Manufacturing Company	Waffle irons, etc. (sold in 1930)
1928	Clark Water Heater Company	
1928	Bussmann Company	Electrical fuses
1929	Waters Genter Company	Toastmaster
1939	"Focolipse" heater	Acquired from Pitt Corporation.
1948	Bersted Manufacturing Company	repurchased from Al Bersted
1948	United Electrical Manufacturing Company	"Eskimo" fans - Bersted subsidiary
1948	Swartzbaugh Manufacturing Company	"Everhot" appliances - Bersted subsidiary
1948	Manning, Bowman & Co.	Appliances - Bersted subsidiary
1948	"Tip-Toe" iron	Acquired from Yale & Towne Manufacturing Company
1948	Edison of Canada Limited	
1949	Line Material Company	Power line equipment, Canada
1951	Tropic-Aire	Bus air conditioning
1954	General Mills home appliances	
1956	W. E. Moore & Company	Industrial dryers
1956	Speed Queen	Home laundry equipment
1956	Lectromelt Furnace Corporation	

== Sources ==
- Fligstein, Neil (January 1, 1993). The Transformation of Corporate Control. Harvard University Press. ISBN 978-0-674-90359-3.
- George, William (2003). Antique Electric Waffle Irons 1900-1960: A History of the Appliance Industry in 20th Century America. Trafford Publishing. ISBN 978-1-55395-632-7.
- Gray, James (1954). Business Without Boundary: The Story of General Mills. U of Minnesota Press. p. 311. ISBN 978-0-8166-6001-8.
- "McGraw Electric Buys Power Line Company". Chicago Tribune. June 24, 1949.
- "Our Founder". McGraw Foundation. Archived from the original on October 16, 2014.
- "Our History". Cooper Power Systems. Archived from the original on October 13, 2018.
- "Toastmaster - A History With Dates". Toaster Museum Foundation. Archived from the original on November 5, 2014.
