= Thomas A. Edison, Inc. =

Defunct holding company (1911-57) founded by American inventor Thomas Edison

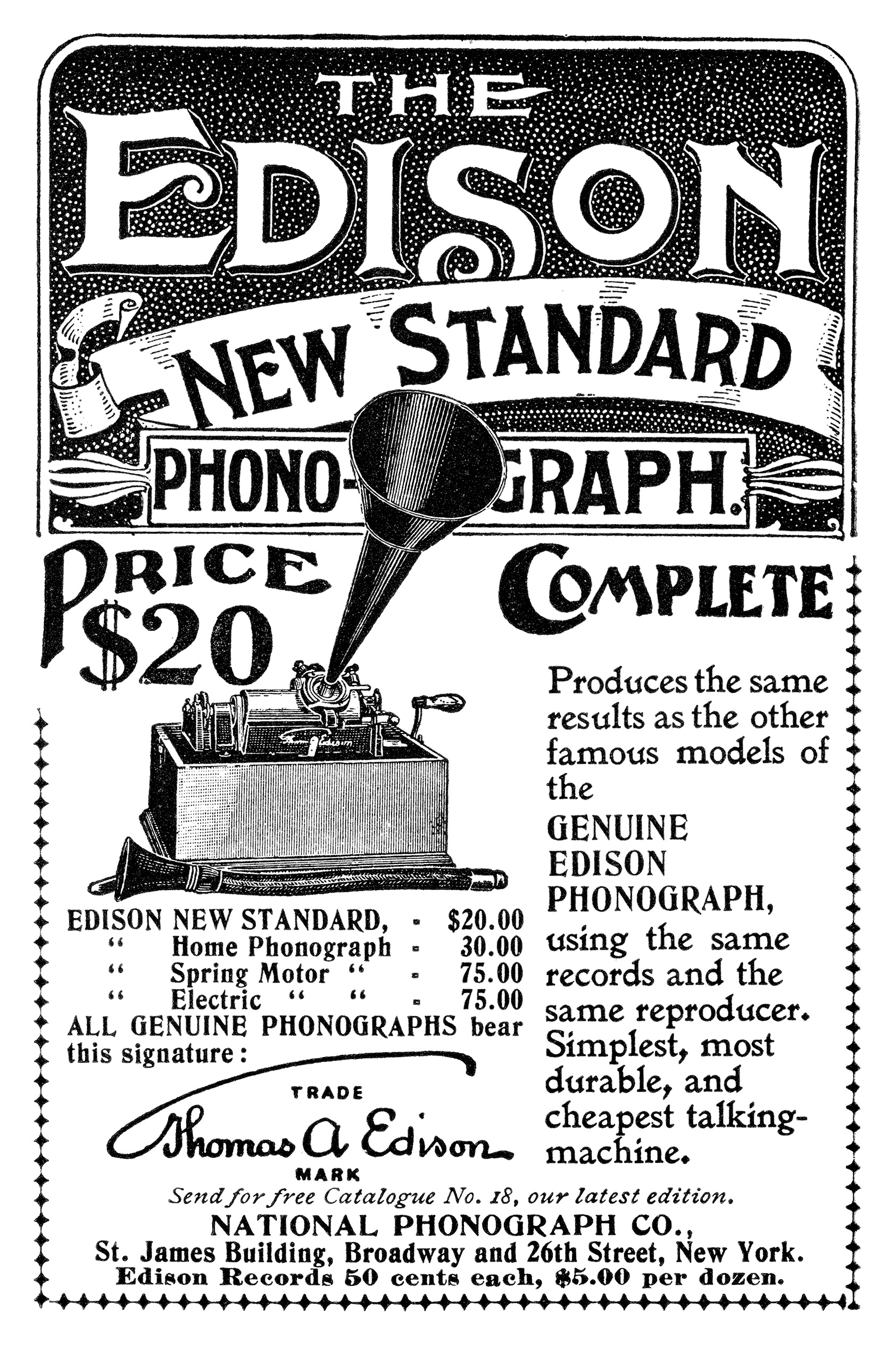
- 1898 ad for the New Standard Phonograph
- Formerly: National Phonograph Company
- Founded: 29 January 1896
- Founder: Thomas Edison
- Defunct: 2 January 1957

Thomas A. Edison, Incorporated (originally the National Phonograph Company) was the main holding company for the various manufacturing companies established by the inventor and entrepreneur Thomas Edison. It was a successor to Edison Manufacturing Company and operated between 1911 and 1957, when it merged with McGraw Electric to form McGraw-Edison. The company operated an industrial research laboratory in West Orange, New Jersey, and had divisions handling products such as phonographs, storage batteries, and consumer appliances. It was led by Thomas Edison and later by his son Charles Edison, who served as president until the merger.

== History ==
Little Mischief (1899); runtime 28 seconds

The National Phonograph Company was incorporated on January 27, 1896. It was restructured and reincorporated as Thomas A. Edison, Inc. on February 28, 1911. Edison Manufacturing Company also became a division of Thomas A. Edison, Inc. at this time.

The company had an industrial research laboratory in West Orange, New Jersey where up to 200 people were employed in the "rapid and cheap development of inventions." Frank L. Dyer was president until December 1912, when Thomas Edison took over the position himself. C.H. Wilson, general manager, was also vice president from 1912. Edison resigned as president in August 1926 in favor of his son, Charles Edison, and became chairman of the board.

The company had divisions handling different products such as phonographs, Ediphone, and storage batteries. One of the first products were Blue Amberol cylinders and the Amberola player, an early sound recording medium and player. This was followed by the Edison Diamond Disc. In 1915 the soprano Anna Case and contralto Christine Miller showed in a tone test at the West Orange lab that there was no difference between their live voices and Diamond Disc recordings of their voices. Other Edison companies were absorbed in the years that followed, including Edison Phonograph Works (August 28, 1924), Edison Storage Battery Company (June 30, 1932) and Emark Battery Corporation (December 30, 1933).

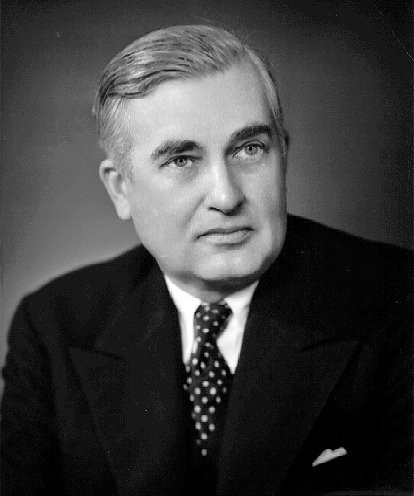
Charles Edison, president of the company 1927–57

In the 1920s the recording company began to lag in technical innovation, and also failed to attract recording stars of the same quality as its rivals Victor and Columbia. An attempt to market a long playing record in 1926 did not succeed, and the company did not begin recording electrically (with condenser microphones) until mid-1927, two years after the rest of the industry had adopted the process. In 1928 the company finally moved into radio with the purchase of the Splitdorf Radio Corp. On November 1, 1929 Edison halted production of records apart from dictation records made by the Voicewriter division. In the late 1920s the "Edicraft" line of high-quality consumer appliances was developed at the laboratory and manufactured by Thomas A. Edison, Inc. Production of appliances was discontinued in 1934 due to lack of demand for luxury goods during the Great Depression.

== Merger ==
Max McGraw, founder and president of McGraw Electric, had always been an admirer of Thomas Alva Edison, and had his picture hanging in his office. In 1956 he arranged a meeting with his son Charles Edison, former Governor of New Jersey and Secretary of the Navy, to discuss merging their two companies. They spent a few days at the Broadmoor resort in Colorado Springs, Colorado and came to an agreement. The merger was effective January 2, 1957. The combined company was named the McGraw-Edison Company. Max McGraw would joke after the merger that his name now appeared before Edison's on the New York Stock Exchange.

== See also ==
- Edison Records
- Edison Studios

== Sources ==
- "Thomas A. Edison, Incorporated (Edison Companies)". Rutgers.
- "Edison Manufacturing Company (Edison Companies)". Rutgers.
- George, William (2003). Antique Electric Waffle Irons 1900-1960: A History of the Appliance Industry in 20th Century America. Trafford Publishing. ISBN 978-1-55395-632-7.
- Hoffmann, Frank (November 12, 2004). Encyclopedia of Recorded Sound. Routledge. ISBN 978-1-135-94950-1.
- "Our Founder". McGraw Foundation. Archived from the original on October 16, 2014.
