= Clear Lake, Iowa =

City in Iowa, United States

- City
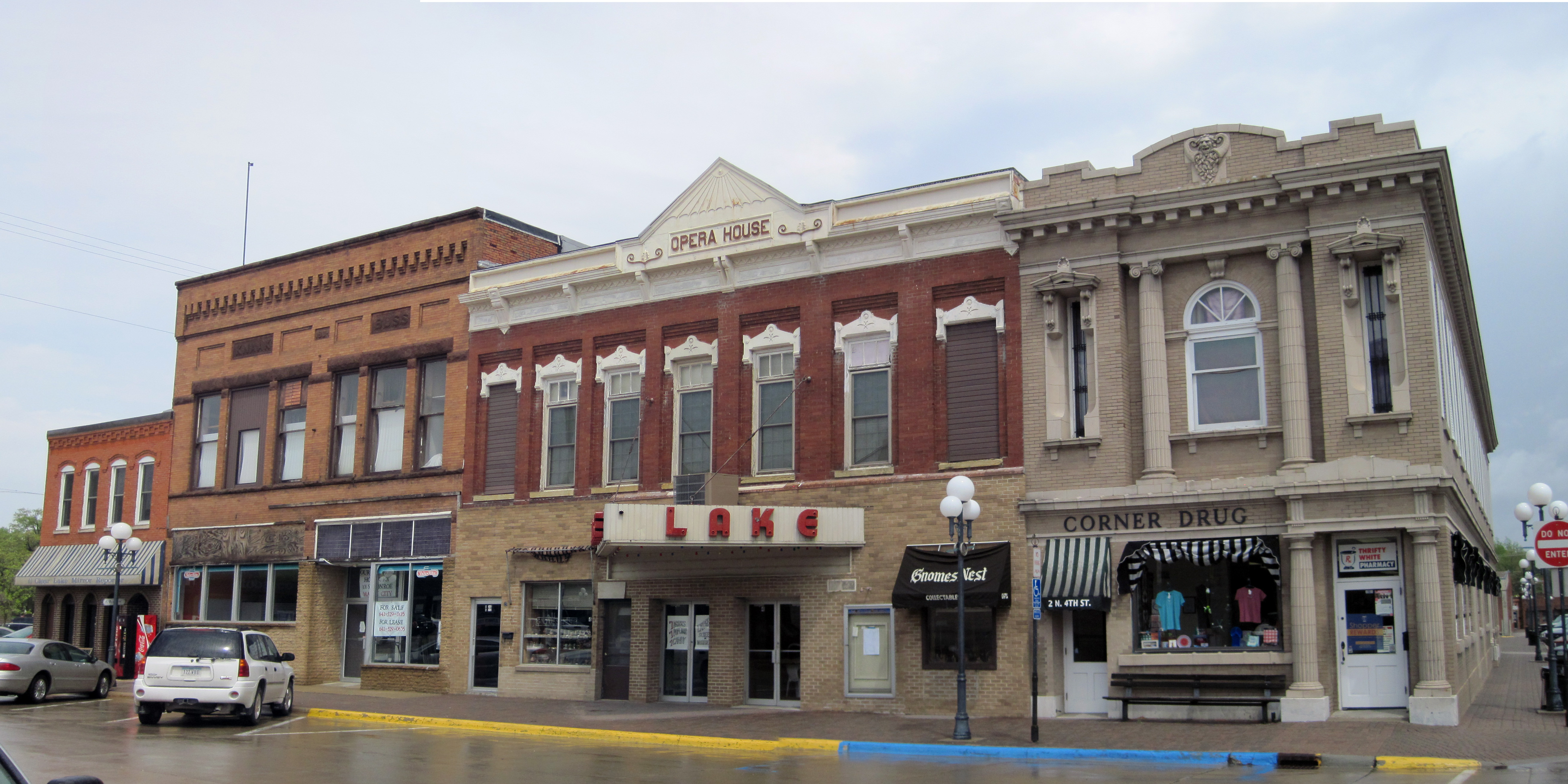
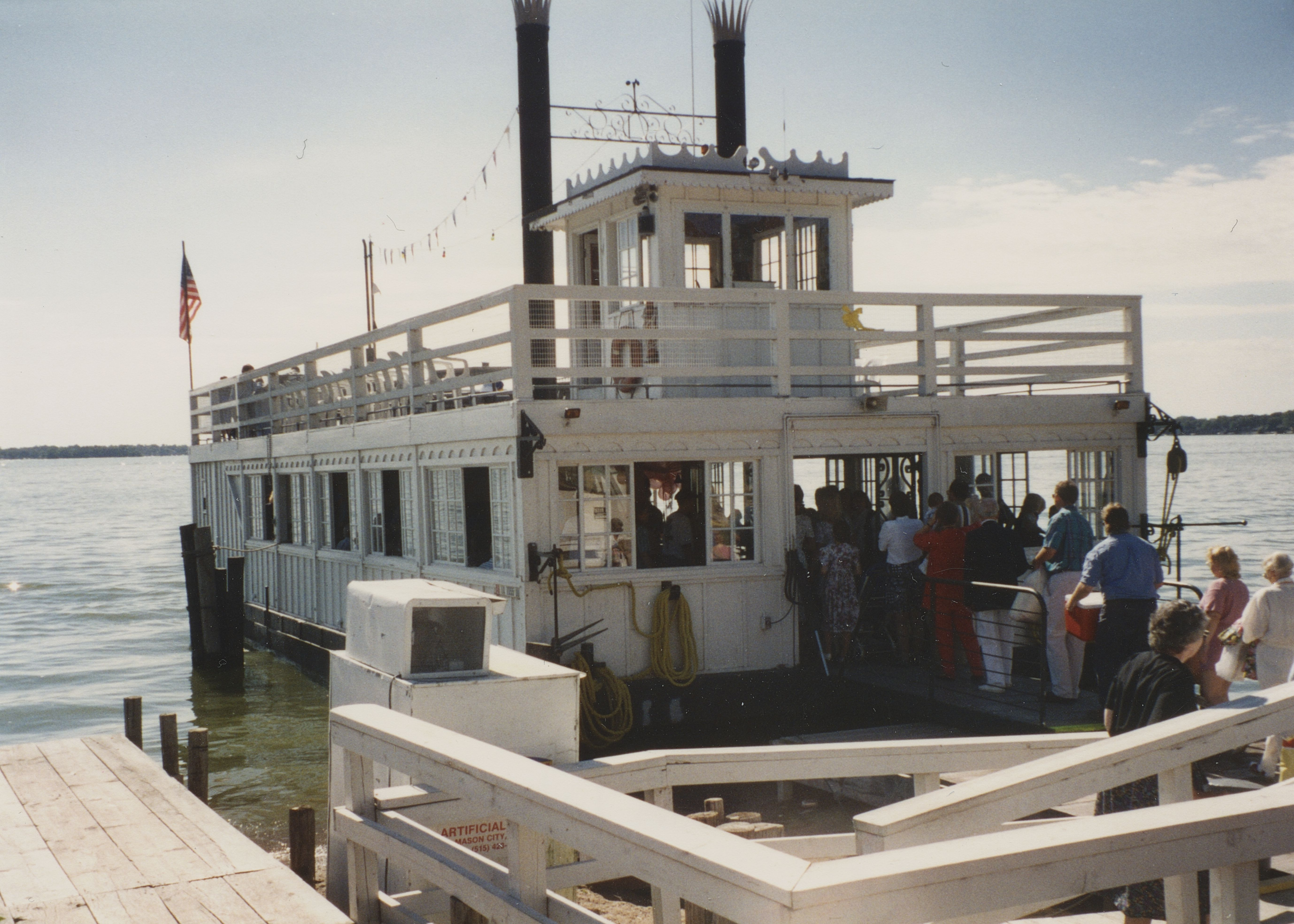
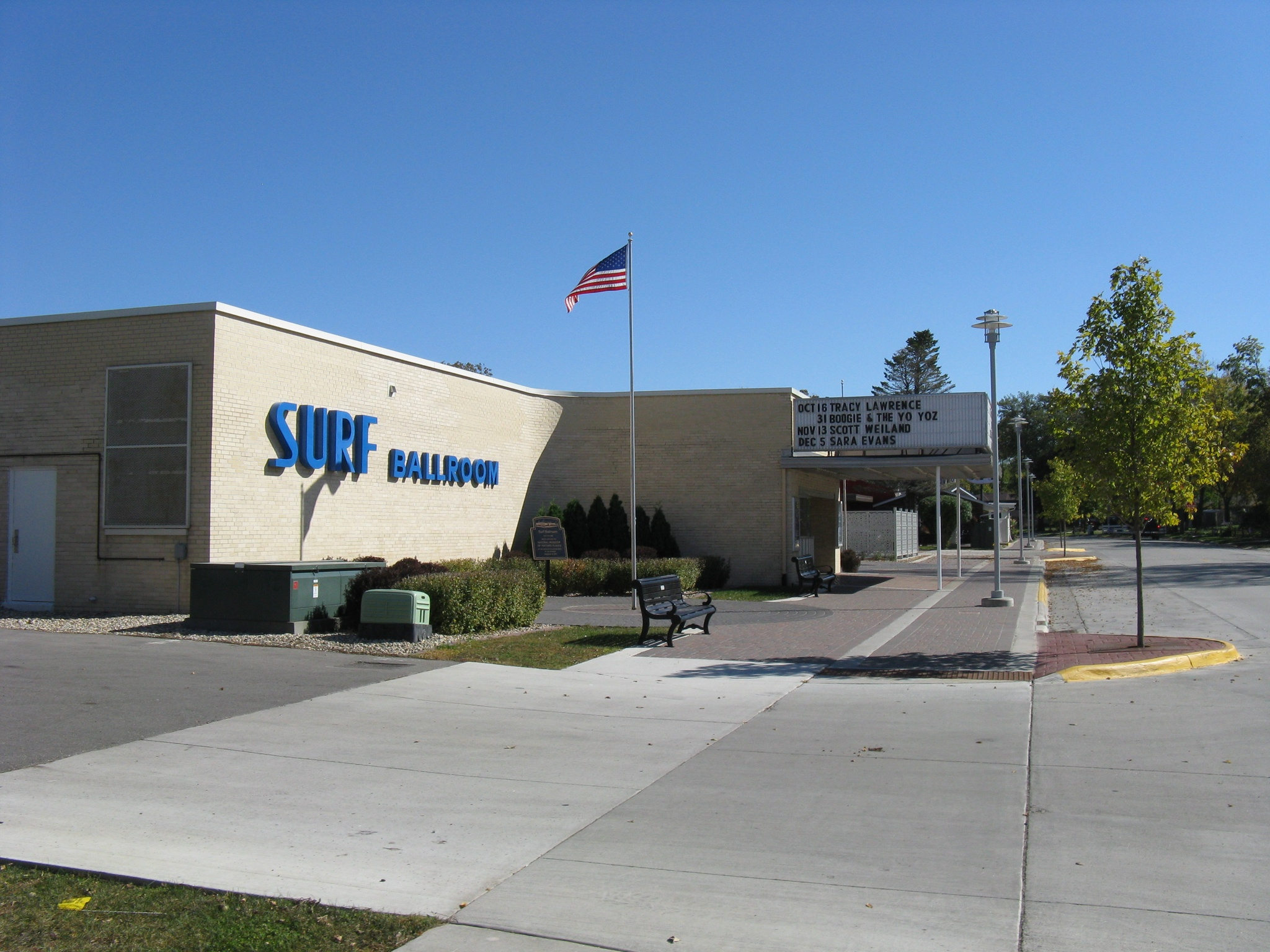
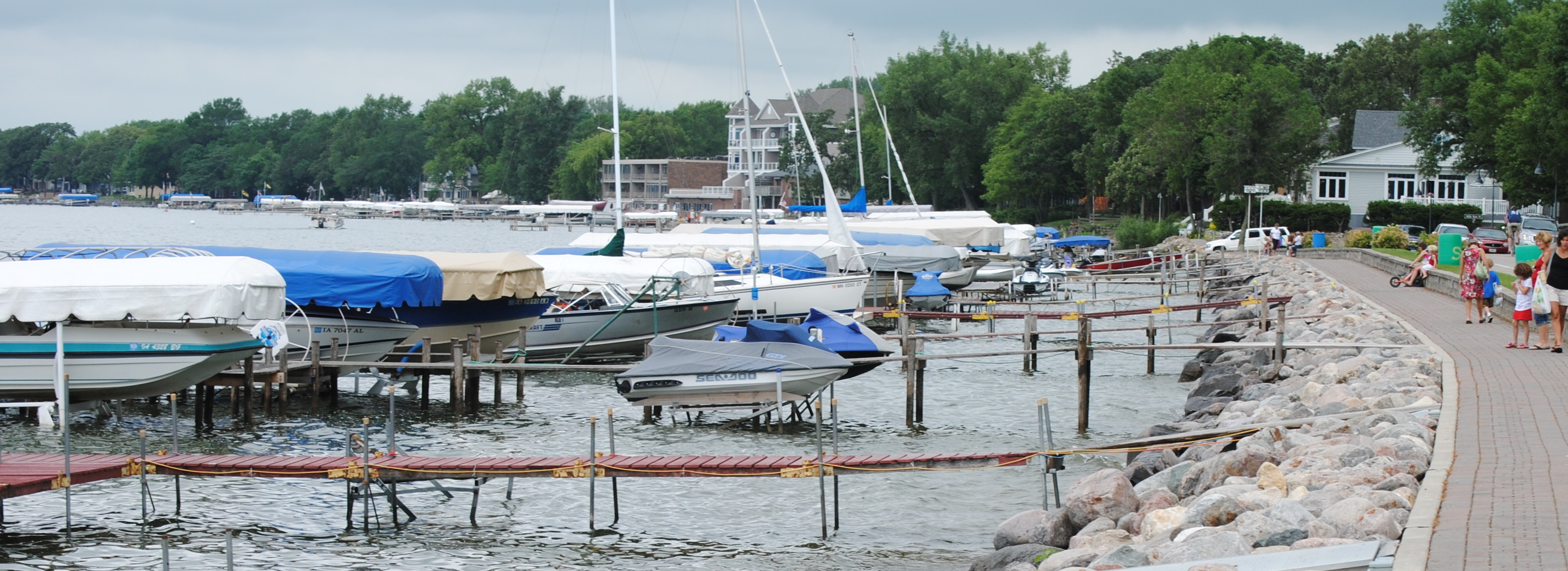
- Historic Downtown Clear Lake Lady of the Lake Paddle steamer Surf Ballroom Clear Lake Waterfront

- Logo

- Location of Clear Lake, Iowa
- Coordinates: 43°07′41″N 93°23′10″W
- Country: United States
- State: Iowa
- County: Cerro Gordo

Area
  - Total: 13.37 sq mi (34.63 km^{2})
  - Land: 10.78 sq mi (27.92 km^{2})
  - Water: 2.59 sq mi (6.71 km^{2})
- Elevation: 1,230 ft (370 m)

Population (2020)
  - Total: 7,687
  - Density: 713.1/sq mi (275.34/km^{2})
- Time zone: UTC-6 (Central (CST))
  - Summer (DST): UTC-5 (CDT)
- ZIP code: 50428
- Area code: 641
- FIPS code: 19-14025
- GNIS feature ID: 467618
- Website: www.cityofclearlake.com

Clear Lake is a city in Cerro Gordo County, Iowa, United States. The population was 7,687 at the 2020 census. The city is named for the large natural lake on which it is located. Clear Lake is seasonal resort town known for its rock and roll heritage, water sports, nearby state parks, and as a sailing destination.

Clear Lake is located on Interstate 35 halfway between the Twin Cities and Des Moines. It serves as a regional hub with nearby Mason City for north-central Iowa. The city is included in the Mason City, IA Micropolitan Area along with all of Cerro Gordo and Worth counties.

== History ==
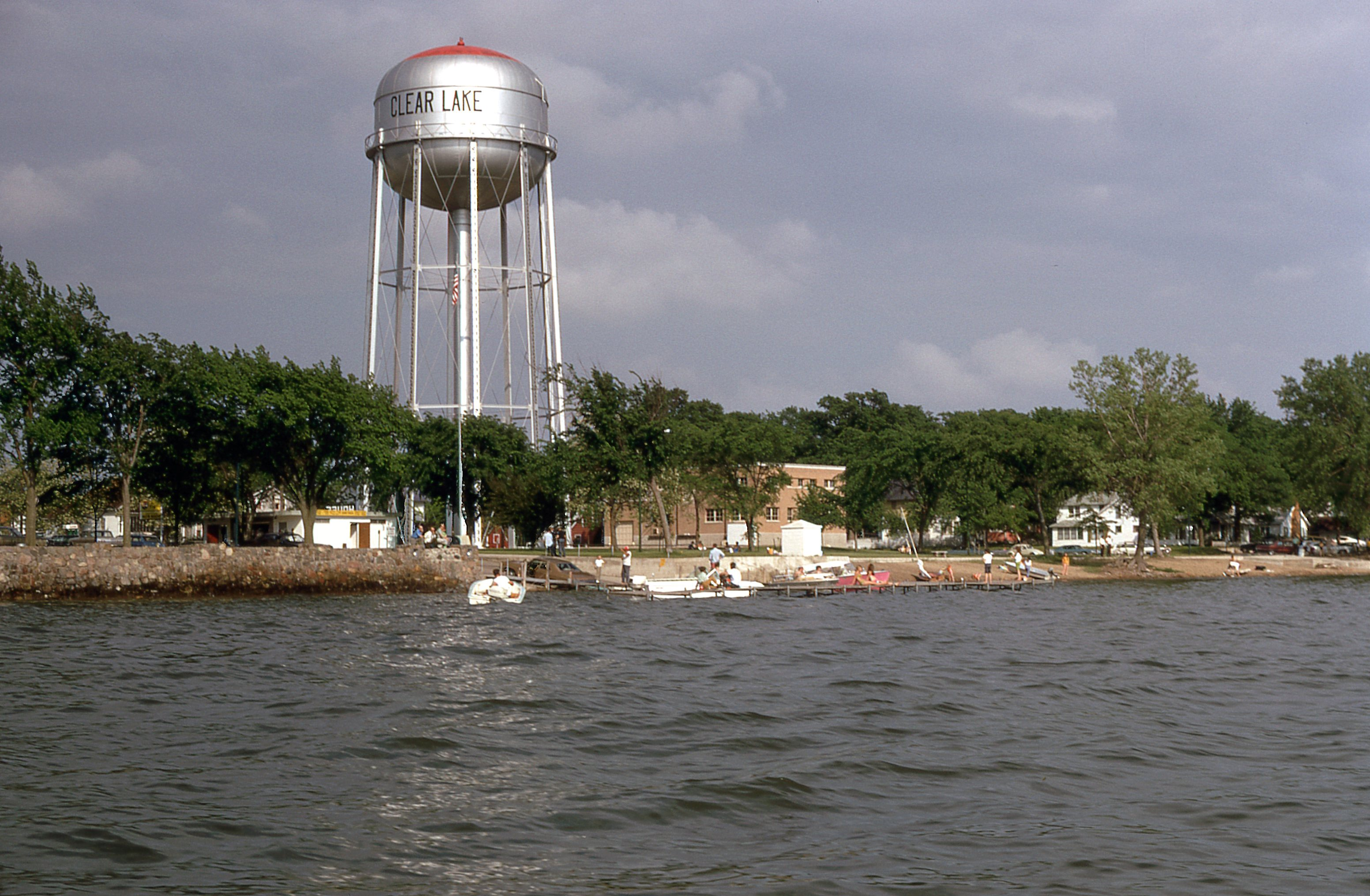
Clear Lake water tower and shoreline, 1970

The region around the lake that would later be called Clear Lake was a summer home to the Dakota and Winnebago American Indians. During a land survey of northern Iowa done in 1832 by Nathan Boone, the son of explorer Daniel Boone, a map was made showing the lake and other bodies of water in the area.

In 1851, Joseph Hewitt and James Dickirson brought their families to camp on the east side of Clear Lake, soon building a cabin, and began a friendship with the Winnebago natives. By 1853, many more white settlers had also came to settle in the area. By the year 1855, the first Clear Lake school was built as well as the first steam saw mill. In that year a hotel was built by James Crow.

By 1870, the town had 775 residents and by 1871 the streets were graded and sidewalks were made of raised boards, sure signs of a thriving new city. The city of Clear Lake was incorporated on May 26, 1871. The first bandstand in Clear Lake was built in 1877 at the City Park. The town continued to grow and built its first library in 1889. In 1909, Bayside Amusement park opened for the first time. The first North Iowa Band Festival was organized by John Kopecky, among others, in 1932.

In 1933, the Surf Ballroom opened up on the site of the old Tom Tom ballroom that had been destroyed by fire. The opening dance night saw approximately 700 couples attend. In 1947, the Surf Ballroom burned down; a new Surf Ballroom was built across the street the following year. The Bayside Amusement park closed down in 1958.

=== The Day the Music Died ===
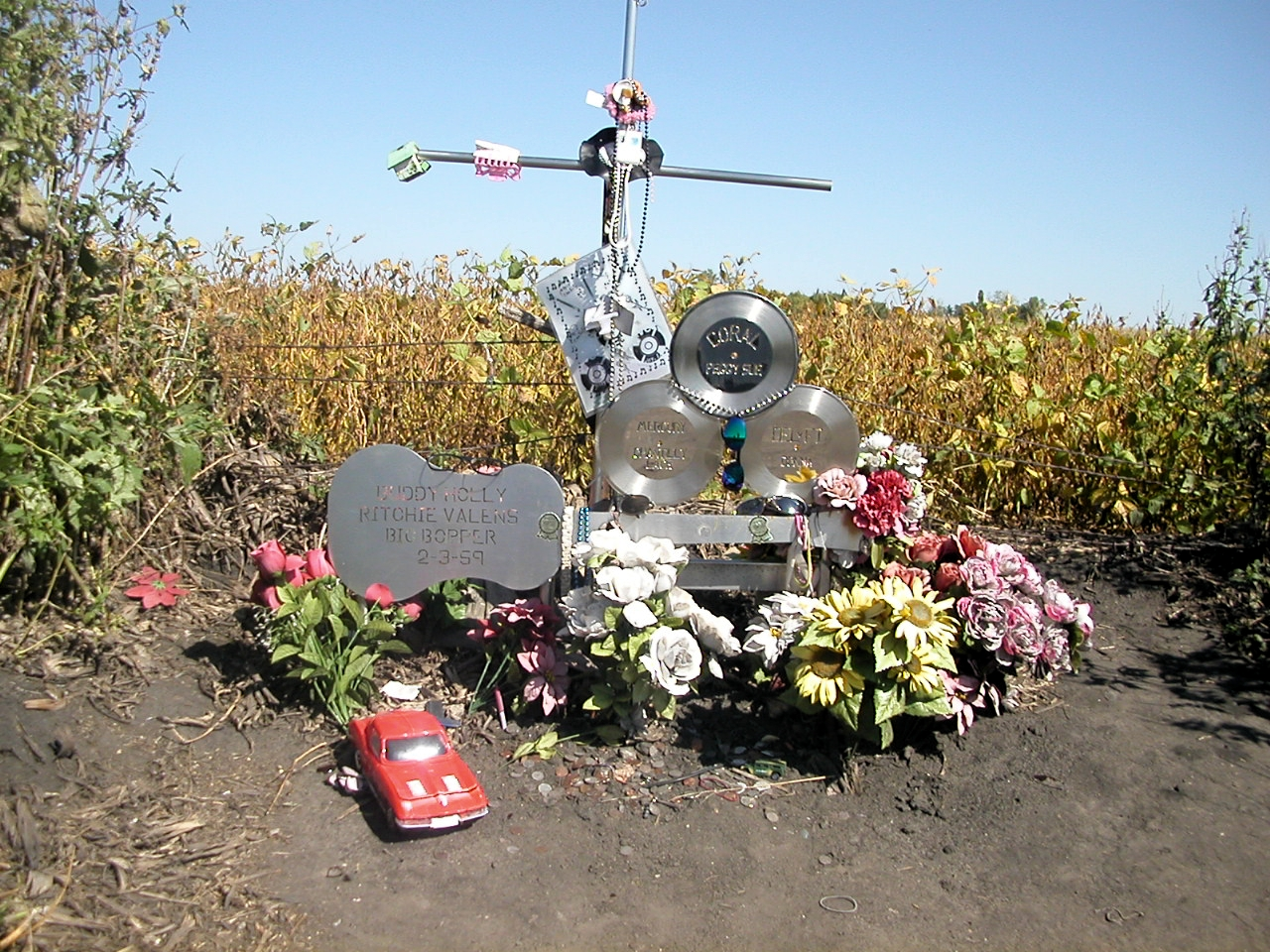
Monument at crash site

In the early hours of February 3, 1959, a Beechcraft Bonanza aircraft carrying Buddy Holly, Ritchie Valens, and The Big Bopper, who had been performing at the Surf Ballroom in Clear Lake, took off from the local runway in nearby Mason City, on its way to the next show in Moorhead, Minnesota.

The plane crashed soon after take off, killing everyone aboard including the 21-year old pilot Roger Peterson. The event was later eulogized by folk singer Don McLean in his 1971 song "American Pie", which led to the crash being nicknamed "The Day the Music Died".

In June 1988, around 600 people gathered to witness the dedication of the monument to the three musicians. Clear Lake also renamed Second Place North to "Buddy Holly Place".

== Geography ==
According to the United States Census Bureau, the city has a total area of 13.44 square miles (34.81 km^{2}), of which 10.80 square miles (27.97 km^{2}) is land and 2.64 square miles (6.84 km^{2}) is water.

=== Climate ===
Clear Lake, Iowa has a hot/warm summer humid continental climate (Dfa).

Climate data for Mason City Municipal Airport
Month	Jan	Feb	Mar	Apr	May	Jun	Jul	Aug	Sep	Oct	Nov	Dec	Year
Record high °F (°C)	62 (17)	66 (19)	84 (29)	93 (34)	99 (37)	103 (39)	104 (40)	101 (38)	99 (37)	95 (35)	79 (26)	67 (19)	104 (40)
Mean daily maximum °F (°C)	25 (−4)	29 (−2)	42 (6)	58 (14)	70 (21)	80 (27)	83 (28)	81 (27)	73 (23)	60 (16)	43 (6)	28 (−2)	56 (13)
Daily mean °F (°C)	16 (−9)	21 (−6)	33 (1)	47 (8)	58 (14)	68 (20)	72 (22)	69 (21)	61 (16)	48 (9)	34 (1)	20 (−7)	46 (8)
Mean daily minimum °F (°C)	7 (−14)	12 (−11)	24 (−4)	35 (2)	47 (8)	57 (14)	61 (16)	58 (14)	49 (9)	37 (3)	24 (−4)	11 (−12)	35 (2)
Record low °F (°C)	−31 (−35)	−32 (−36)	−28 (−33)	6 (−14)	22 (−6)	36 (2)	42 (6)	35 (2)	24 (−4)	12 (−11)	−16 (−27)	−26 (−32)	−32 (−36)
Average precipitation inches (mm)	0.82 (21)	1.00 (25)	2.23 (57)	3.75 (95)	4.68 (119)	5.14 (131)	4.70 (119)	4.04 (103)	3.27 (83)	2.45 (62)	1.88 (48)	1.24 (31)	35.20 (894)
Average snowfall inches (cm)	10.8 (27)	7.7 (20)	6.0 (15)	2.7 (6.9)	0.0 (0.0)	0.0 (0.0)	0.0 (0.0)	0.0 (0.0)	0.0 (0.0)	0.4 (1.0)	4.3 (11)	9.3 (24)	41.2 (105)
Average precipitation days (≥ 0.01 in.)	7.5	7.2	9.2	11.1	12.1	11.2	9.7	9.5	8.7	8.8	8.0	8.5	111.5
Average snowy days (≥ 0.1 in.)	6.8	5.1	3.5	1.7	0	0	0	0	0	0.5	3.4	7.2	28.2
Source: National Centers for Environmental Information

== Demographics ==
Historical population
Census	Pop.	Note	%±
1870	775		—
1880	1,095		41.3%
1890	1,130		3.2%
1900	1,706		51.0%
1910	2,014		18.1%
1920	2,804		39.2%
1930	3,066		9.3%
1940	3,764		22.8%
1950	4,977		32.2%
1960	6,158		23.7%
1970	6,430		4.4%
1980	7,458		16.0%
1990	8,183		9.7%
2000	8,161		−0.3%
2010	7,777		−4.7%
2020	7,687		−1.2%
Iowa Data Center

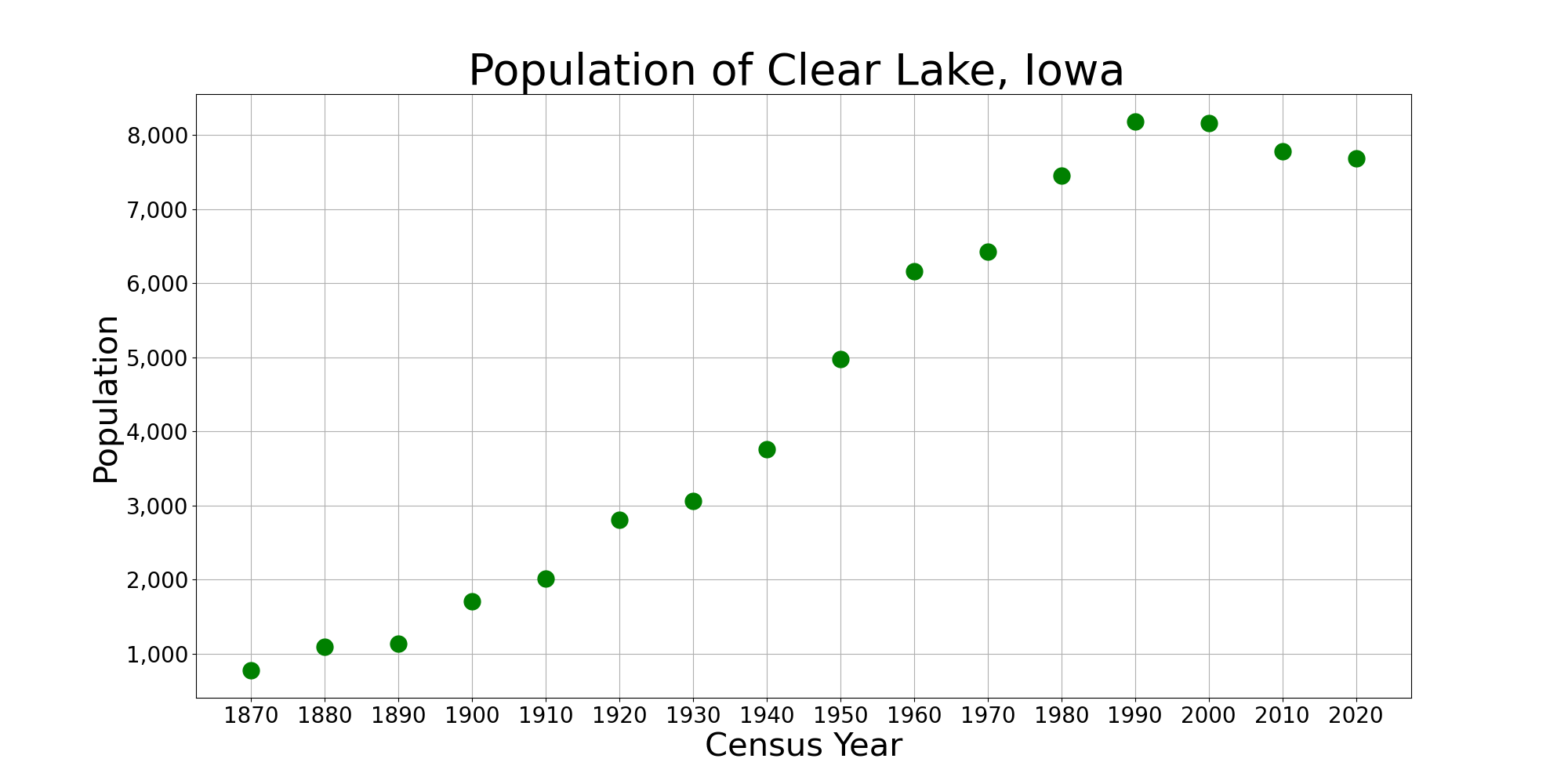
The population of Clear Lake, Iowa from US census data

Clear Lake is part of the Mason City Micropolitan Statistical Area.

=== 2020 census ===
As of the 2020 census, there were 7,687 people, 3,586 households, and 2,083 families residing in the city. The population density was 713.1 inhabitants per square mile (275.3/km^{2}). There were 4,749 housing units at an average density of 440.6 per square mile (170.1/km^{2}).

94.9% of residents lived in urban areas, while 5.1% lived in rural areas. Of all housing units, 24.5% were vacant. The homeowner vacancy rate was 1.6% and the rental vacancy rate was 24.0%.

Racial composition as of the 2020 census
Race	Number	Percent
White	7,115	92.6%
Black or African American	98	1.3%
American Indian and Alaska Native	9	0.1%
Asian	106	1.4%
Native Hawaiian and Other Pacific Islander	5	0.1%
Some other race	47	0.6%
Two or more races	307	4.0%
Hispanic or Latino (of any race)	230	3.0%

Of households, 21.7% had children under the age of 18 living with them, 46.6% were married-couple households, 5.9% were cohabiting-couple households, 29.6% were households with a female householder and no spouse or partner present, and 17.8% were households with a male householder and no spouse or partner present. 41.9% of all households were non-families, 36.9% were made up of individuals, and 18.6% had someone living alone who was 65 years old or older.

The median age in the city was 49.1 years. 19.1% of residents were under the age of 18. 21.0% of residents were under the age of 20; 4.1% were between the ages of 20 and 24; 21.0% were from 25 to 44; 27.4% were from 45 to 64; and 26.5% were 65 years of age or older. The gender makeup of the city was 48.0% male and 52.0% female. For every 100 females there were 92.1 males, and for every 100 females age 18 and over there were 89.4 males age 18 and over.

=== 2010 census ===
As of the census of 2010, there were 7,777 people, 3,507 households, and 2,087 families residing in the city. The population density was 720.1 inhabitants per square mile (278.0/km^{2}). There were 4,423 housing units at an average density of 409.5 per square mile (158.1/km^{2}). The racial makeup of the city was 96.3% White, 0.5% African American, 0.1% Native American, 1.2% Asian, 0.5% from other races, and 1.4% from two or more races. Hispanic or Latino of any race were 2.2% of the population.

There were 3,507 households, of which 25.0% had children under the age of 18 living with them, 47.9% were married couples living together, 8.6% had a female householder with no husband present, 3.0% had a male householder with no wife present, and 40.5% were non-families. 35.3% of all households were made up of individuals, and 16% had someone living alone who was 65 years of age or older. The average household size was 2.16 and the average family size was 2.78.

The median age in the city was 46.3 years. 20.7% of residents were under the age of 18; 6.2% were between the ages of 18 and 24; 21.2% were from 25 to 44; 31.9% were from 45 to 64; and 20.2% were 65 years of age or older. The gender makeup of the city was 48.2% male and 51.8% female.

=== 2000 census ===
As of the census of 2000, there were 8,161 people, 3,461 households, and 2,239 families residing in the city. The population density was 782.4 inhabitants per square mile (302.1/km^{2}). There were 4,156 housing units at an average density of 398.4 per square mile (153.8/km^{2}). The racial makeup of the city was 96.99% White, 0.27% African American, 0.13% Native American, 0.92% Asian, 0.06% Pacific Islander, 0.75% from other races, and 0.88% from two or more races. Hispanic or Latino of any race were 1.86% of the population.

There were 3,461 households, out of which 28.4% had children under the age of 18 living with them, 52.4% were married couples living together, 9.6% had a female householder with no husband present, and 35.3% were non-families. 31.1% of all households were made up of individuals, and 12.9% had someone living alone who was 65 years of age or older. The average household size was 2.28 and the average family size was 2.86.

Age spread:23.0% under the age of 18, 7.6% from 18 to 24, 26.7% from 25 to 44, 25.1% from 45 to 64, and 17.7% who were 65 years of age or older. The median age was 41 years. For every 100 females, there were 91.2 males. For every 100 females age 18 and over, there were 87.4 males.

The median income for a household in the city was $35,097, and the median income for a family was $45,589. Males had a median income of $30,266 versus $21,356 for females. The per capita income for the city was $20,213. About 5.0% of families and 7.6% of the population were below the poverty line, including 8.0% of those under age 18 and 5.7% of those age 65 or over.

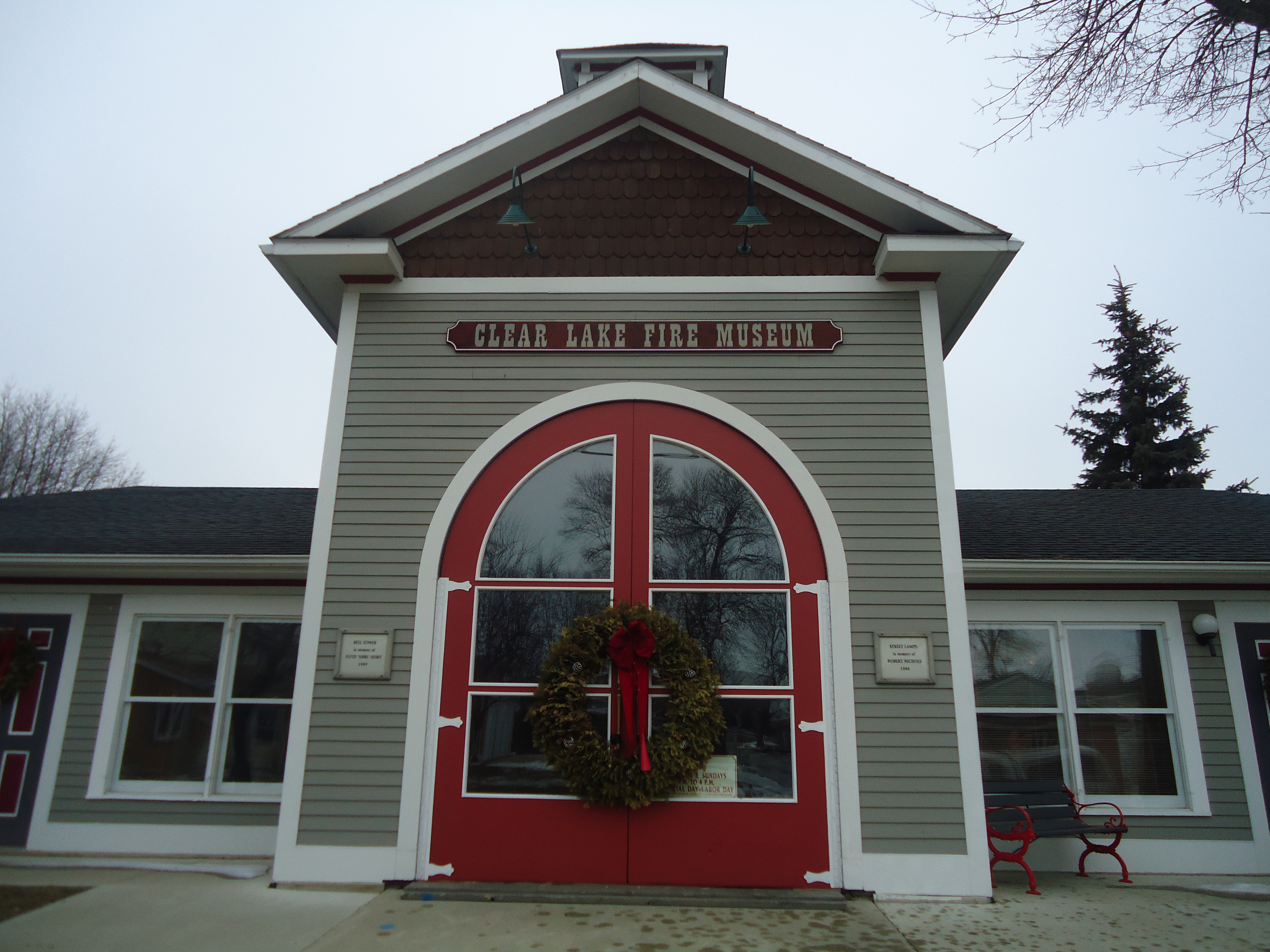
Clear Lake Fire Museum, 2013

== Arts and culture ==
- Surf Ballroom: Site of Buddy Holly, Ritchie Valens and The Big Bopper's last concert, the Surf Ballroom continues to host concerts and can be reserved as a convention hall or reception site. It is also a tourist attraction and holds a tribute to the three rock and roll singers each February.
- Lady of the Lake: A sternwheeler ferry boat which takes passengers on a scenic cruise around Clear Lake. It has an enclosed lower level and an open upper level.
- Clear Lake Fire Museum: Designed to resemble an early fire station, this museum's highlights include a 1924 Ahrens-Fox pumper truck, the city's 1883 hand-pulled hose cart, and the original fire bell used by the department. A memorial is dedicated to honor firefighters who have served Clear Lake.
- Guardian Angel Roadside Chapel: Built by Jack Kennedy, the Guardian Angel Chapel overlooks Interstate 35 and is open to the public daily.
- Clear Lake Arts Center: This non-profit organization displays local and regional artists' work along with a sales gallery and art classes open to the public.
- PM Park: Site of the Patriarchs Militant camp (a subgroup of the Independent Order of Odd Fellows). Established in 1914, turned into a historical eating and lodging venue.
- Central Gardens of North Iowa, Inc. has over 20 themed gardens on nearly 3 acres of land and is the only free public garden within 90 miles of Clear Lake. It is open daily, dawn to dusk, May 1 through October 31 and offers over 50 free activities, events, and programs each year.
- Lake Theatre: Historic single screen movie theatre showing current titles. Originally an Opera House, converted to movie theatre in 1935.

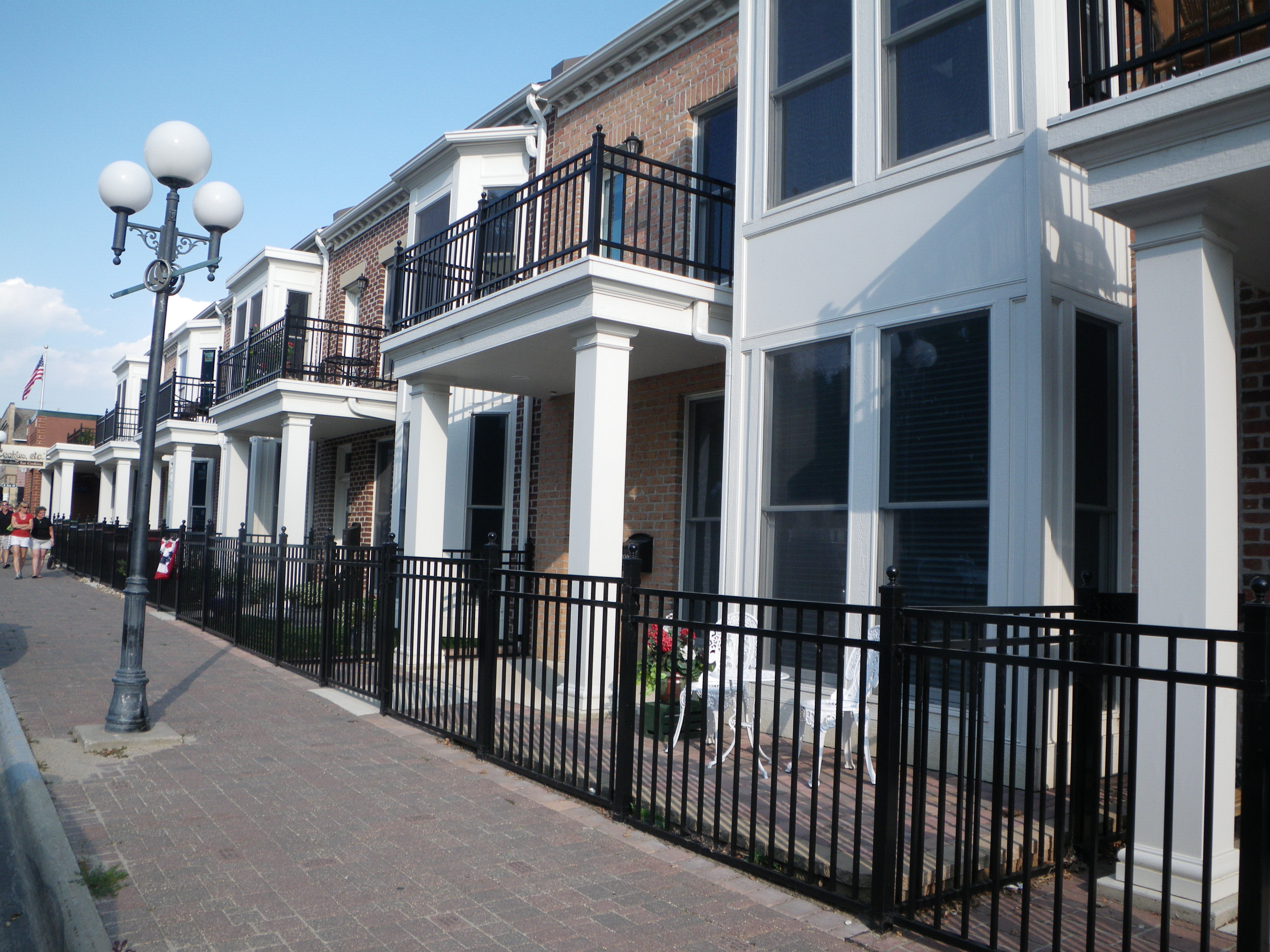
Downtown Clear Lake rowhouses

== Education ==
The majority of the municipality is in the public school district, Clear Lake Community School District. Clear Creek Elementary School hosts preschool, kindergarten, and grades 1–5; Clear Lake Middle School hosts grades 6–8; and Clear Lake High School hosts grades 9–12. Lakeside Alternative, an alternative school program, is run jointly with the Garner–Hayfield–Ventura Community School District in neighboring Ventura, Iowa.

A small portion of the municipality lies in the Garner-Hayfield-Ventura district instead of the Clear Lake district. This part was previously in the Ventura Community School District, until that district merged into Garner-Hayfield-Ventura on July 1, 2015.

Clear Lake Classical, a preK–8 Classical Christian school, is the only private school in the city.

== Infrastructure ==
=== Transportation ===
Clear Lake is located along Interstate 35 approximately halfway between the Twin Cities and Des Moines, Iowa. U.S. Highway 18 runs east–west through the northern side of the city until it meets Interstate 35; at this interchange, Iowa Highway 122 begins and continues to the east. U.S. 18 proper continues to the south, overlapping an approximately 3.5-mile stretch of Interstate 35 and Iowa Highway 27 (part of the Avenue of the Saints). Just south of the city, U.S. 18 and Iowa 27 break from Interstate 35 and continue to the east.

The North Iowa Area Council of Governments operates Region 2 Transit, which provides city and regional demand responsive public bus transit. Jefferson Lines, a private intercity bus service, maintains a stop in Clear Lake with service to locations throughout the Midwest.

Mason City Municipal Airport is located immediately to the east of Clear Lake.

Two freight rail lines run through the city. Canadian Pacific Railway operates a line parallel to U.S. 18, which stops at a minor grain facility; trackage rights are given to the Iowa Northern Railway. Progressive Rail maintains the Iowa Traction Railway, a shortline railroad which runs between Clear Lake and Mason City.

=== Utilities ===
The city's electric power and natural gas utilities are provided by Alliant Energy. Since 2004, Alliant Energy has operated a natural gas—fired electricity generation plant southeast of the city.

Sewage treatment is provided by the Clear Lake Sanitary District, a local government entity separate from the city government. Wastewater travels through pump stations within the city before being routed to a treatment plant to the south. There, it is filtered, processed through a sequencing batch reactor, and disinfected with ultraviolet light. Some of the resulting treated effluent is routed to the nearby Alliant Energy plant for cooling purposes.

Telephone, cable television, and internet services are provided by local provider CL Tel and Mediacom.

Water supply services are provided by the city. The city's water is drawn from shallow wells in the Cedar Valley Formation.

Waste collection services are also provided by the city and operated by local company Absolute Waste Removal. Further processing is performed at the Landfill of North Iowa to the east.

=== Health care ===
MercyOne Medical Center North Iowa in neighboring Mason City is the nearest hospital. Both MercyOne and Iowa Specialty Hospital operate clinics within the city.

In September 2020, construction began on a wellness center near Clear Lake High School for joint use by Clear Lake Community School District and the community.

== Notable people ==
- Carl S. Bates (1884–1956), aviation pioneer and inventor of the Bates Monoplane
- Todd Blodgett - Member of White House staff (Reagan-Bush) 1985-87.
- Richie Hayward (1946–2010), founding member for the rock band Little Feat
- Will Kirk Kaynor (1884–1929), United States Representative for Massachusetts
- Milo Knutson (1917–1981), mayor of La Crosse, Wisconsin and Wisconsin State Senator
- Max McGraw (1883–1964), founder of McGraw-Edison and Centel
- Robert Allan Phillips (1906–1976), Lasker Award-winning physician, developed fluid replacement treatment for cholera

== See also ==
- Mirror Reporter
