= Speed Queen Ripon plant =

- Operated: 1908–present
- Location: 221 Shephard Street; Ripon, Wisconsin, United States
- Coordinates: 43°51′3″N 88°49′55″W
- Industry: Home appliances
- Products: top-load washing machines; front-load washing machines; clothes dryers
- Employees: 1,000
- Area: 58 acres (23 ha)
- Volume: 1,000,000 square feet (93,000 m^{2})
- Owner: Alliance Laundry Systems

Speed Queen Ripon plant is an appliance manufacturing plant in Ripon, Wisconsin, owned by Alliance Laundry Systems.

== History ==
The plant traces its roots in 1908 when Barlow & Seelig Manufacturing was founded. Barlow & Seelig was renamed Speed Queen Company in the mid-20th century, and was later purchased by McGraw-Edison. In 1979, McGraw-Edison sold its appliance division (including the Ripon plant) to Raytheon Company.

In May 2016, Alliance Laundry approved a $62.6 million expansion to its Ripon, Wisconsin campus. This project was completed in April 2017, adding 225,000 square feet of new buildings, a North America sales and marketing headquarters, and 200 permanent jobs.

In August 2019, Alliance Laundry expanded its Ripon footprint by acquiring the 330,000-square-foot former Manitowoc Crane Company plant in Manitowoc, Wisconsin to move select operations, freeing up the maxed-out Ripon plant and creating up to 250 new jobs.
