= Carl S. Bates =

Carl S. Bates (January 1, 1884 – August 27, 1956) was an aviation pioneer from Clear Lake, Iowa. He piloted gliders in 1899, and in 1906 he designed a gasoline-powered airplane that was equipped with an air-cooled engine, a metal propeller and metal wing rudders.

== Biography ==
Bates was the first person in Iowa to fly a heavier-than-air aircraft. He also built, flew and sold several aircraft and plans. Foundations of the modern hang gliding movement are traced in part to the popular Chanute style biplane that he spread with his articles to the public, as well as providing plans for homebuilders to build the biplane hang glider.

In 1898 at age 14, Bates built and flew a hang glider.

In April 1909, he authored a Popular Science how-to article on hang glider construction.

In 1911, Bates designed a built and monoplane with an engine of his own design.

In 1912, Bates sold his company, the Bates Aeroplane Co, to Edward Bayard Heath.

Bates died in 1956.

== Legacy ==
In 2002 Carl S. Bates was inducted in the Iowa Aviation Hall of Fame.

== See also ==
- History of hang gliding
- Ultralight aviation
- Biplane
