= Nytronics, Inc. =

Nytronics, Inc. was a Berkeley Heights, New Jersey–based manufacturer of metal products and electronics parts. It merged with Bastian-Blessing Company of Phoenix, Arizona in November 1980. The consolidated firm was called Bastian Industries. The company is significant for the variety of products it produced and its consolidation with business concerns, which added to its diversity as a business.

Bastian-Blessing made modular food service equipment for restaurants and products for oil and industry. The merger of the two corporations was delayed by the acquisition of the food service equipment division of the McGraw-Edison Company, by Bastian-Blessing, in June 1980.

== History of business ==
Nytronics, Inc., acquired control of Burnell & Co., a Pelham, New York, maker of electronic filter networks, in March 1966. The corporation entered the field of industrial controls with the takeover of the Electro-Mec Instrument Corporation of Watertown, Connecticut, in August 1966.
