= Max McGraw =

American entrepreneur (1883–1964)

- McGraw on a hunting expedition
- Born: 1 February 1883; Clear Lake, Iowa, US
- Died: 26 October 1964 (aged 81); Utah, US
- Occupation: Entrepreneur
- Known for: McGraw-Edison and Centel

Max McGraw (1 February 1883 – 26 October 1964) was an American entrepreneur who founded McGraw-Edison and Centel. He financed marketing of the first domestic toaster, the Toastmaster. He was also a conservationist and hunter.

== Early years ==
Max McGraw was born in Clear Lake, Iowa on 1 February 1883, and grew up in Sioux City, Iowa. As a youth he became fascinated with electricity. While at high school he enrolled in a correspondence course in electrical engineering and organized an amateur telegraph circuit linking the homes of fourteen of his friends. He delivered newspapers and did odd jobs to save money.

In the summer of 1900, aged 17, McGraw entered business as an electrician. He called his enterprise the McGraw Electric Company. Most of his early work was wiring houses that were converting from gas to electricity. The business struggled at first, but in the second year gained profitable contracts from the Stockyards and the Peavey Grand Opera House in Sioux City. In 1902 the McGraw Electric Company moved into larger premises on Fifth Street, Sioux City. In 1903 McGraw organized the Interstate Supply Company in partnership with his father and four others, selling mill, railroad and electrical equipment. This business grew rapidly. McGraw married Frances Schaaf on 16 August 1904. They had two daughters and a son.

In 1907 McGraw founded the Interstate Electric Manufacturing Company, which manufactured magnetos, telephones and power switchboards. In 1910 he merged the supply and manufacturing companies into the Interstate Supply and Manufacturing Company. In 1912 he bought the Lehmer Company, a mill supply and electrical equipment manufacturer which he had used as a model for his earlier enterprises. He merged this company and the Interstate Supply and Manufacturing Company into the McGraw Electric Company, taking the position of President. The combined business had sales of more than $2 million that year.

== Utilities ==
McGraw bought the Central Telephone and Electric Company of St. Louis, Missouri in July 1922. He also bought an electric light plant in South Dakota and acquired electric and telephone companies in Iowa, Nebraska, South Dakota and Minnesota. By 1925 the company was providing electricity or telephone service throughout the US mid-west. On 28 June 1926 the electric and telephone utilities were spun off into the Central West Public Service Company, which combined more than twenty former companies. In the mid-1930s the company was reorganized and renamed the Central Electric and Telephone Company, Inc. In May 1944 McGraw split the company into the Central Electric & Gas Company and the Central Telephone Company, a subsidiary. Central Electric & Gas, under president Judson Large, expanded through mergers and acquisitions in the 1950s and early 1960s. The company shifted its focus from power supply to telephone service, and formed the nucleus of what became the Centel Corporation. McGraw continued to chair the company until his death.

== Appliances ==
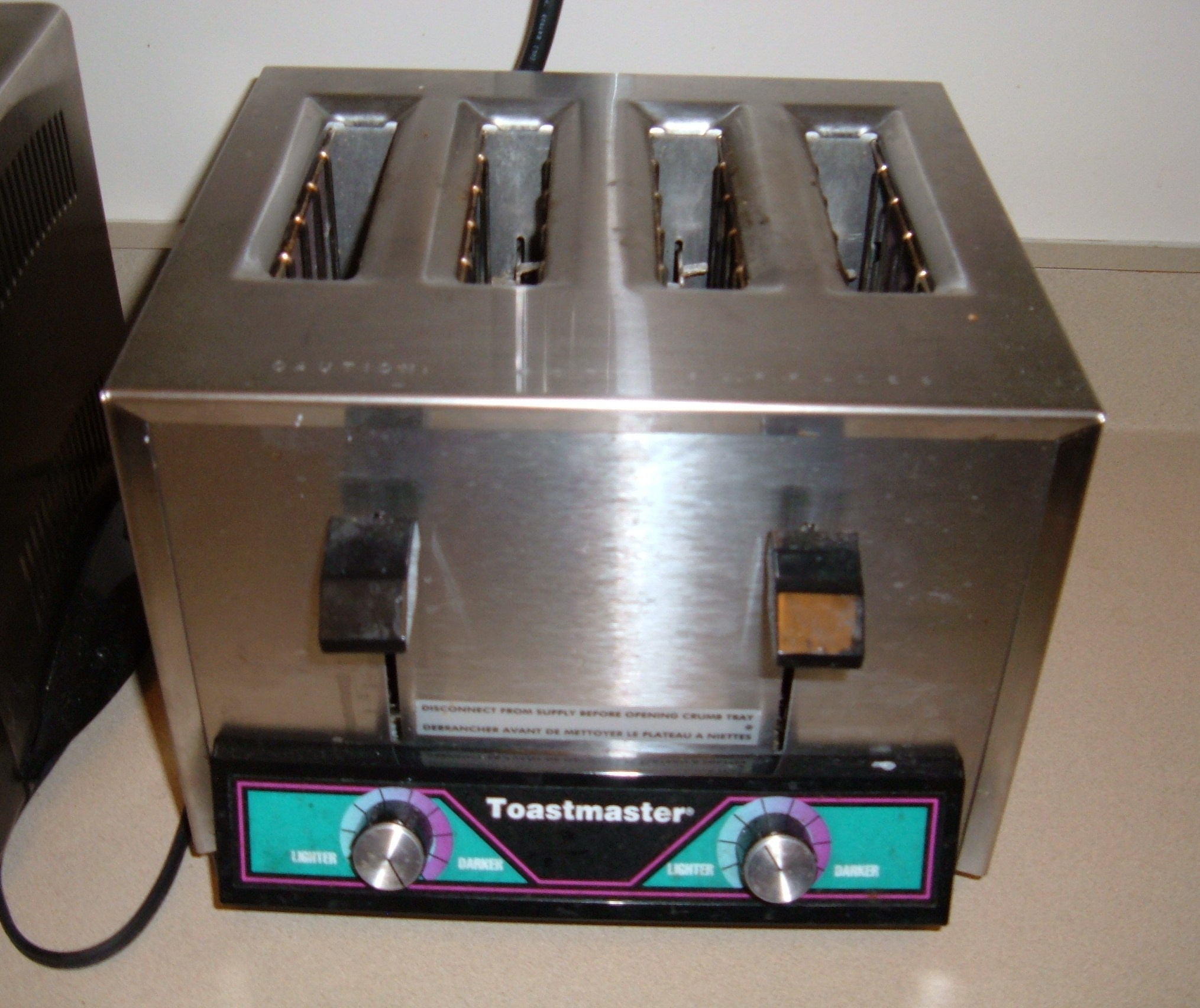
Toastmaster toaster

McGraw bought Bersted Manufacturing in 1926, and made it a division of McGraw Electric, keeping Al Bersted as president of the division. In 1930 the division was sold back to Al Bersted. The Waters-Genter Company of Minneapolis manufactured a pop-up toaster for restaurants called the Toastmaster. In 1926 McGraw used his private capital to buy an interest in the company. He provided the capital needed to enter the household market in 1927, and that year acquired the company. He sold his interests to McGraw Electric in 1929.

McGraw Electric grew steadily through acquisitions. McGraw used to say, "Never buy a company unless it is making money or seems about to go broke," a philosophy that served him well. In 1948 McGraw bought Bersted Manufacturing a second time, and made Al Bersted president. Eventually Bersted became CEO of the company. By 1955 McGraw Electric had thirty one divisions, with gross annual sales of nearly $300 million. In 1956 McGraw arranged a merger with Thomas A. Edison, Incorporated. The combined McGraw-Edison Company was launched in January 1957.

McGraw was primarily concerned with cash flow and capital expenditure, which was controlled from head office, and otherwise gave his division heads considerable latitude. He said in 1955, "Each division president is responsible. His ingenuity, judgement, and ability are expected to produce profits. He is judged according to his showing. He hires and fires, determines salaries and wage rates within a general acceptable pattern, and he has freedom within reasonable limits to establish his division's organizational pattern."

In 1959 McGraw named Al Bersted president of the McGraw-Edison Company, retaining the position of chairman of the executive committee.

== Conservationist ==
In 1938 McGraw bought 2,000 acres (810 ha) of land near his new plant in Elgin, Illinois and made it a protected wetland. The Elgin plant converted more than 1,000 loaves of bread into toast each day as part of its toastmaster testing process. The toast was delivered to the wetlands to feed the water fowl. The Max McGraw Wildlife Foundation managed crop fields in northcentral Illinois, and allowed dove shooting on a few days each year. In 1959 Max McGraw, the McGraw Foundation and the estate of Marion Randall Parsons funded publication of This Is the American Earth by the Sierra Club, which appeared in 1960. The beautifully prepared book had photographs of natural scenes in the US by Ansel Adams and text by Nancy Newhall.

Max McGraw died suddenly on 26 October 1964 in Utah while on a hunting trip. He was aged 81, and was still chairman of the companies he had founded. The McGraw Foundation was established in Northbrook, Illinois in 1948 with funding by Max McGraw and other friends and family members. It supports various causes, including higher education related to science and the environment, and provides significant funding to the Max McGraw Wildlife Foundation. The mission of the Max McGraw Wildlife Foundation is "Secure the future of hunting, fishing and land management through programs of science, education, demonstration and communication". The McGraw Foundation has provided a $1.2 million endowment to the University of Michigan to fund the Max McGraw Professorship on Corporate Environmental Management.

== Sources ==
- Baskett, Thomas S. (1993-01-01). Ecology and Management of the Mourning Dove. Stackpole Books. ISBN 978-0-8117-1940-7.
- "Centel Corporation History". International Directory of Company Histories. Vol. 6. St. James Press. 1992.
- Fligstein, Neil (1993-01-01). The Transformation of Corporate Control. Harvard University Press. ISBN 978-0-674-90359-3.
- George, William (2003). Antique Electric Waffle Irons 1900-1960: A History of the Appliance Industry in 20th Century America. Trafford Publishing. ISBN 978-1-55395-632-7.
- "McGraw Mission". Max McGraw Wildlife Foundation.
- "Our Founder". McGraw Foundation. Archived from the original on 2014-10-16.
- Rogers, Tom (1994). "CEMP: Where the Boardroom and the Back Forty Meet". The Michigan Alumnus. UM Libraries. UOM:39015071120342.
- Spaulding, Jonathan (1998). Ansel Adams and the American Landscape: A Biography. University of California Press. ISBN 978-0-520-21663-1.
- "Welcome". McGraw Foundation. Archived from the original on 2014-10-16.
