= Mirror Reporter =

Clear Lake Mirror Reporter
- Type: Weekly newspaper
- Format: Broadsheet
- Owner: Enterprise Media
- Publisher: Christopher Hall
- Editor: David Hotle
- Founded: 1869
- Headquarters: 12 N. 4th St. Clear Lake, Iowa 50428; United States
- Circulation: 1,769
- Website: clreporter.com

The Clear Lake Mirror Reporter is a weekly newspaper published in Clear Lake, Iowa.

== History of the Mirror Reporter ==
The first Clear Lake newspaper was the Independent, established by Silas Noyes and John M. Brainard. The first issue bore the date, February 10, 1860. Its publication was continued for about a year, when it was moved to Hancock Country.

The Observer was then established in 1869. George E. Frost was the first proprietor of the Observer. After two years of editorship he sold the office to Judge M.P. Rosecrans who made the paper entirely independent, in tone and sentiment, where before it had been strongly republican. Mr. Rosecrans soon sold the office to parties in Belmond. Mr. Frost then purchased a new outfit and for 6 or 7 years was the editor. In 1879 he sold to Mr. Bush who changed the name to the Clear Lake Mirror.

In April 1896, J.C. Davenport established another weekly paper in Clear Lake which he called the Clear Lake Reporter. These two weekly newspapers combined under one ownership with B. Dayton Merriman, who owned the Reporter, buying the Mirror in 1951.

They operated as twin weeklies with the Mirror published on Tuesdays and the Reporter on Fridays until January 1955 when the two joined together to become the Mirror and Reporter.

The Clear Lake Mirror-Reporter was sold by Mid-America Publishing Corporation in 1983 to Prefin, Inc. The team of Dave Presler and Michael Finnegan comprised the business which also owned other area newspapers. Presler moved on from the company and focus was placed to ownership of the Clear Lake paper by Finnegan.

On March 1, 2018, Mid-America Publishing Corporation re-acquired the Mirror-Reporter.

In 2026, the paper was bought by Enterprise Media out of Charles City, Iowa.

The paper publishes weekly on Thursdays.

The staff of the Mirror Reporter is as follows:

- Christopher Hall - Publisher
- David Hotle - Managing Editor
- Jenna Prather - News Editor
- Craig Shultz - Sports Editor
- Chris Barragy - Design
- Joshua Hicks - Sales
