= Toastmaster (appliances) =

Brand of home appliances

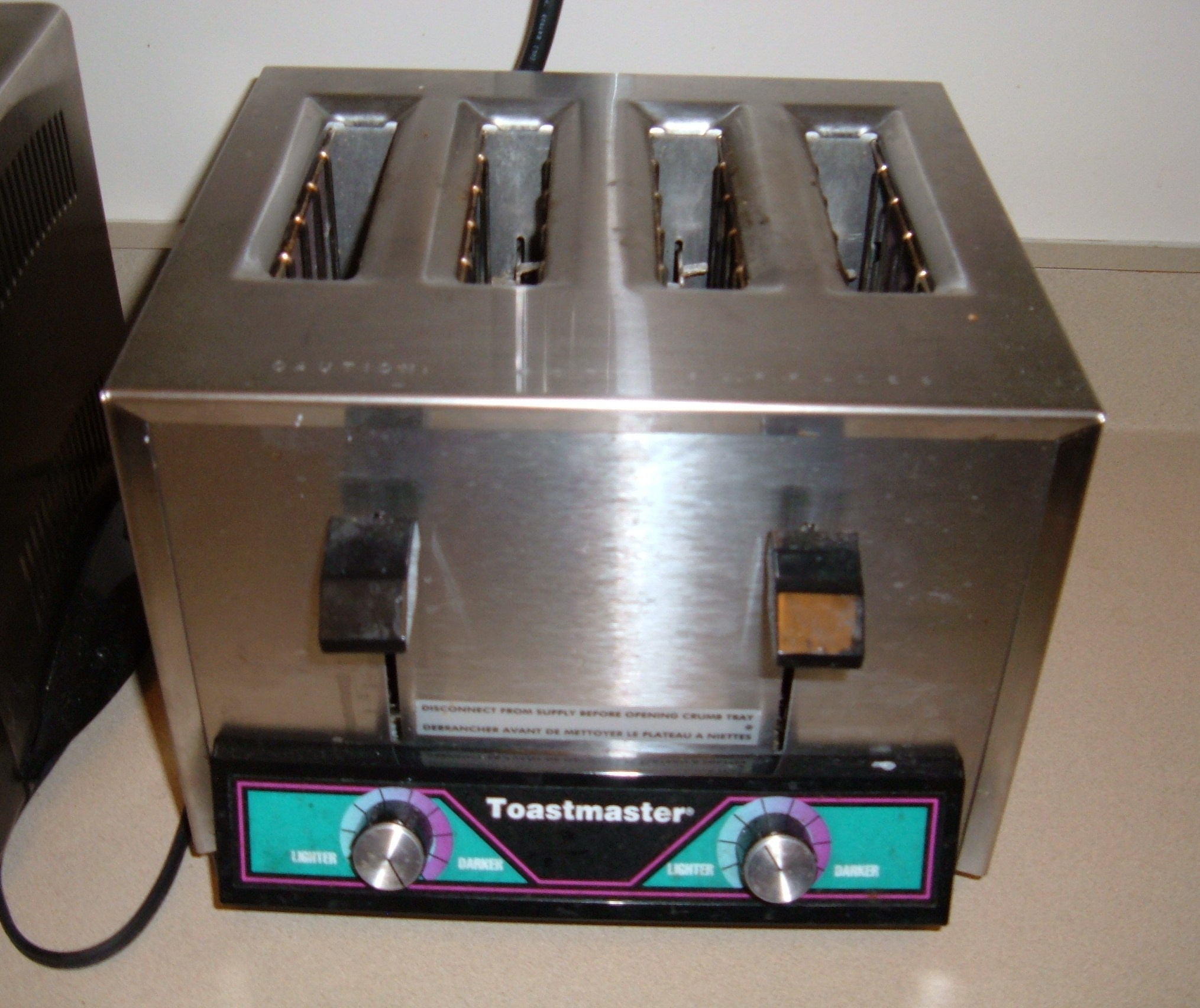
A Toastmaster industrial-grade toaster, capable of toasting sliced bread and bagels

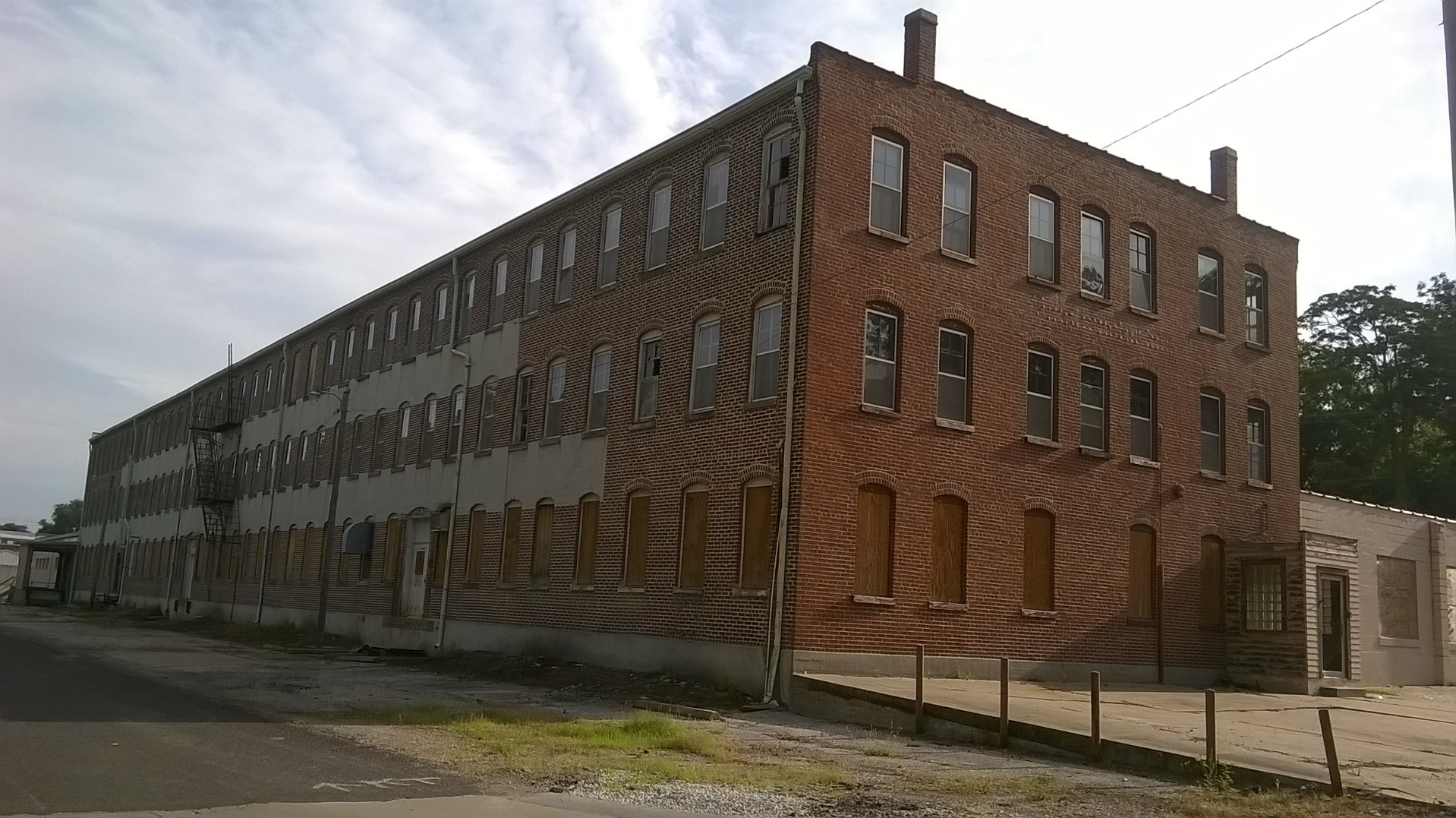
One of the two old Toastmaster manufacturing facilities in Boonville, which have long been vacated.

Toastmaster is a brand name for home appliances. It was originally (1921) the name of one of the world's first automatic electric pop-up toasters for home use, the Toastmaster Model 1-A-1. Since then the Toastmaster brand has been used on a wide range of small kitchen appliances, such as coffeemakers, waffle irons, toasters, and blenders.

== Ownership ==
From 1929 until 1980, the brand was owned by McGraw Electric, renamed to McGraw-Edison in 1957. Following a leveraged buyout in 1980 to Magic Chef, the brand changed hands several times and finally went public in 1992 as Toastmaster, Inc. The company, headquartered in Boonville, Missouri, United States, was acquired by Salton, Inc., in 1999. After a series of acquisitions, the brand is owned by Spectrum Brands, Inc. and since 2012 is licensed to Select Brands, Inc. Commercial Toastmaster products for the food-service industry are manufactured by The Middleby Corporation.

Company headquarters were moved from Boonville to Columbia, Missouri, during the 1970s. Factories were located in Boonville, Macon, Moberly, Kirksville, and Clarence, all in Missouri, and Laurinburg, North Carolina. Three large warehouse facilities were operated in Columbia too. Product brands included Toastmaster, Manning-Bowman, Edison, Everhot, Bersted, Eskimo fans, Zero fans, Ingraham clocks and timers and several others. The Vita-Mix blender was also built under contract with Vita-Mix.

== Products ==
Products manufactured during the 1970 and 1980 decades were toasters, griddles, box fans, waffle bakers, sandwich makers, ceiling fans, toaster ovens, convection ovens, bread makers, humidifiers, clocks, timers, etc. Other products marketed by the company in the 1970 and 1980 decades were imported from oversea factories such as mixers, meat slicers, can openers, microwave ovens, oscillating fans, etc. Revenues from a sandwich maker known as the Snackster (originally sold exclusively to Walmart) were significant and lead to the company going public on NYSE in 1992.

== See also ==
- Danby (appliances)
- Gaggenau Hausgeräte
