= Bates Monoplane =

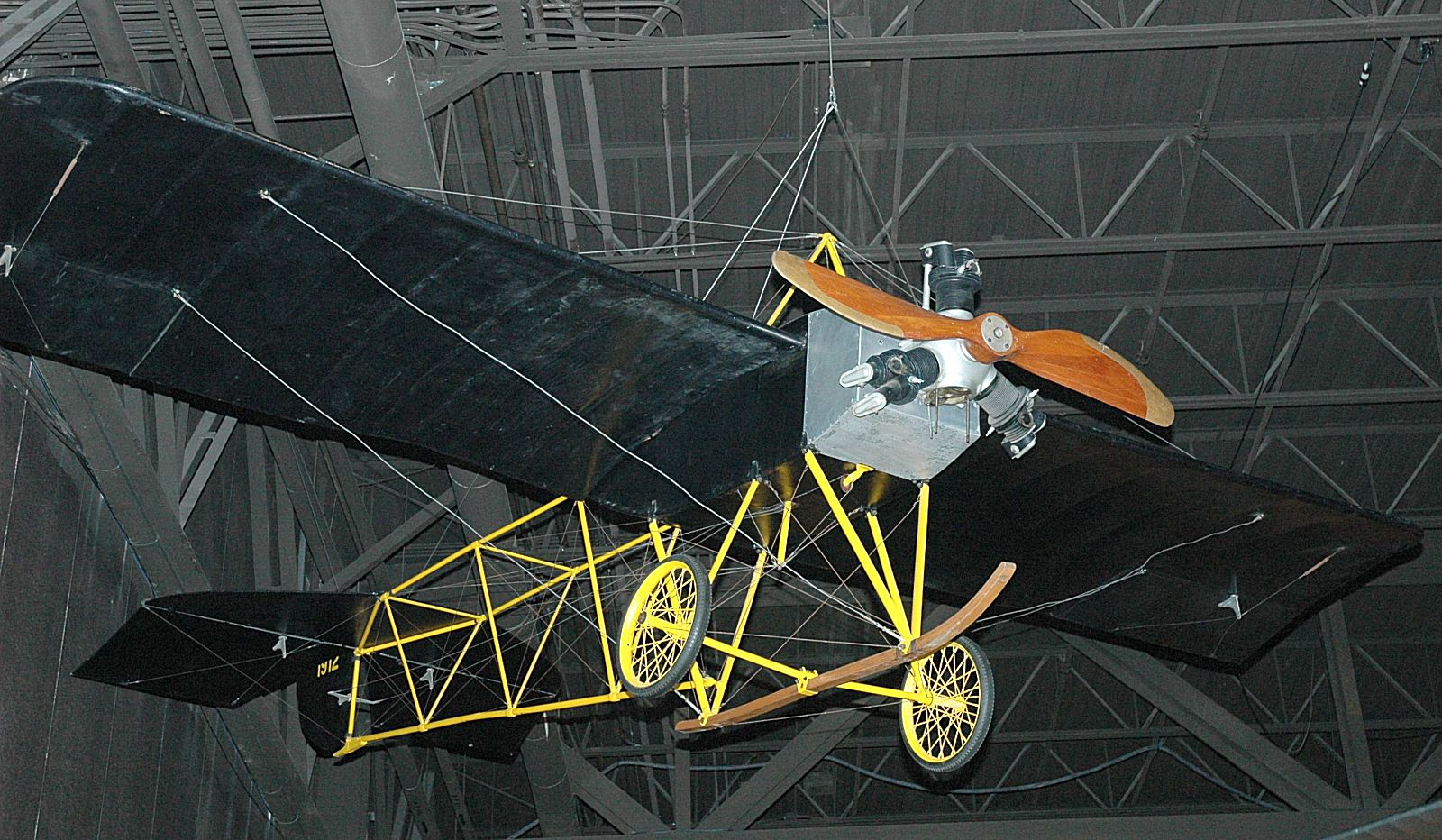

General information
- Type: Sport aircraft
- National origin: United States of America
- Manufacturer: (Carl) Bates Aeroplane Company
- Designer: Carl Sterling Bates

The Bates Monoplane is a pioneering aircraft built by Carl Sterling Bates in 1911.

== Design and development ==
Bates developed his first aircraft, a piloted kite in 1898 at the age of 14 at Clear Lake, Iowa. Later as a student of Octave Chanute, he developed his own 10 hp (7 kW) biplane in 1908 with a similar design as a Curtiss biplane. Bates raced a modified Buick at Daytona with this tricycle gear aircraft. In 1911 he started on an all original design of his own, including a lightweight 30 hp (22 kW) engine.

The monoplane was built using a wooden fuselage, with a fabric covered oval steel tube tail section. Bates developed his own 30 hp (22 kW) engine for the aircraft that was also used on the Steinhous tandem biplane, and the Charles A. Hibbard monoplane of the same period.

== Operational history ==
Bates tested and flew his designs at Cicero Field before the airport officially opened. His monoplane demonstrated, and crashed on the same day when the field opened on 4 July 1911. The aircraft was later rebuilt with a 3-cylinder Poyer engine by Heath.

In 1912 Bates Aeroplane company was sold to Edward Bayard Heath, who refounded it as E.B. Heath Aerial Vehicle Co. (later the Heath Airplane Company, which eventually became the electronics company Heathkit).

An example of a 1912 Bates monoplane is in the EAA Airventure Museum in Oshkosh, Wisconsin It was purchased in 1918 and stored in a barn until its restoration in 1957.

== Specifications (Bates Monoplane) ==
Data from eaa

General characteristics

- Capacity: 1
- Powerplant: 1 × Bates , 30 hp (22 kW) 3-cyl Poyer by Heath Co replaced original engine.
