= Manning, Bowman & Co. =

- Founded: 1849
- Defunct: 1945
- Headquarters: Meriden, Connecticut, United States
- Area served: Predominately the United States
- Key people: E.B. Manning, Robert Bowman, Horace C. Wilcox
- Products: granite iron and pearl agate ware, electro-silver and nickel-plated ware, britannia and planished goods

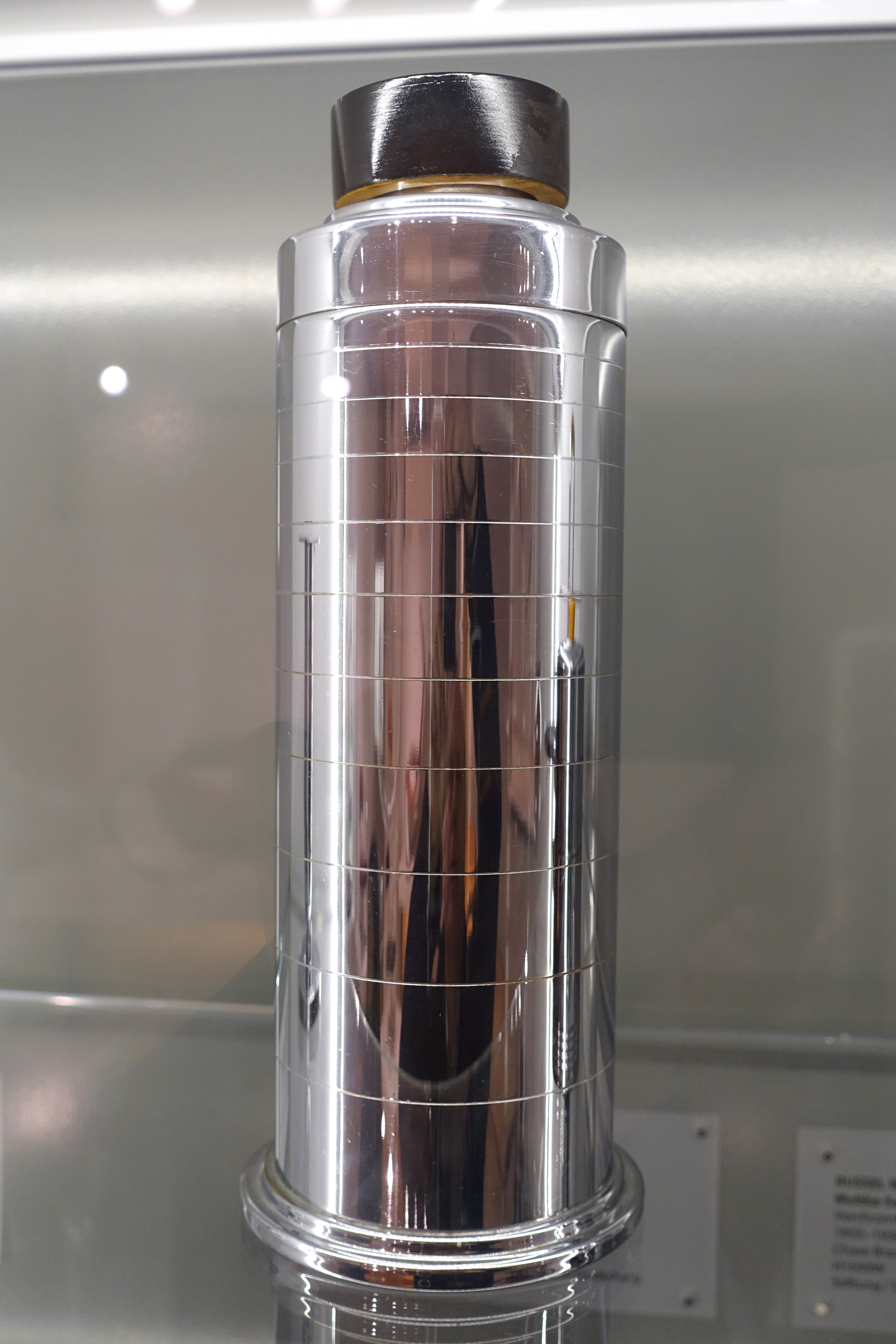
Cocktail shaker design by Jay Ackerman for Manning Bowman & Co., Meriden CT, (1941) at the Museum für Angewandte Kunst Köln, Cologne, Germany.

The Manning, Bowman & Co. (1849-1945) was formed in Meriden, Connecticut, and over the years produced granite iron and pearl agate ware, electro-silver and nickel-plated ware, britannia and planished goods.

The company location was at Pratt and Miller Streets in Meriden, occupying a unique triangular-shaped building that has since been demolished. Across the street across from the Meriden Public Library original, brick back buildings of the original Manning, Bowman & Co. can be seen.

As of 2016, over 70 Manning, Bowman & Co. designs are in American museums and collections, most notably at Connecticut Museum of Culture and History as well as the Brooklyn Museum, the Dallas Museum of Art, Museum of Fine Arts, Boston and Yale University Art Gallery.

Manning, Bowman & Co. exhibited products in the 1876 Centennial Exhibition in Philadelphia, the Exposition Universelle (1878) in Paris and the Melbourne International Exhibition (1880).
