= Alliance Laundry Systems =

American laundry equipment supplier

Alliance Laundry Systems LLC

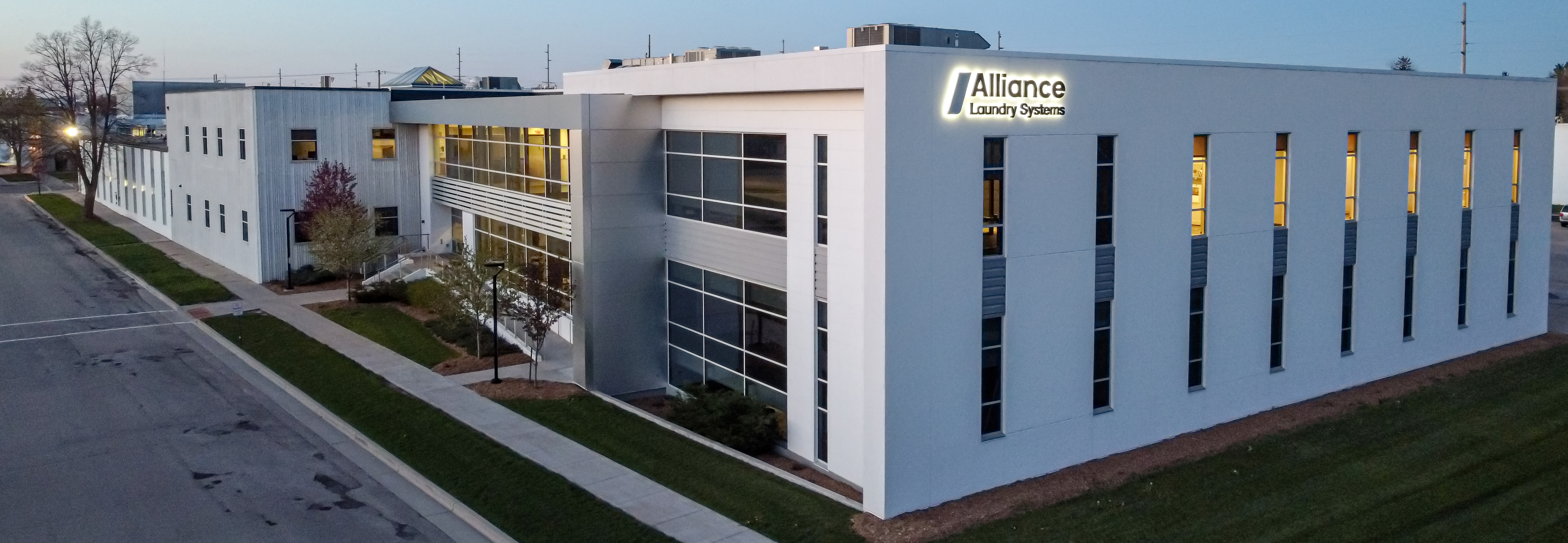
- Headquarters in Ripon
- Type: Public
- Traded as: NYSE: ALH
- Industry: On-premises laundry, Self-service laundry
- Predecessor: Barlow & Seelig Manufacturing; McGraw-Edison's appliance division Raytheon Commercial Laundry
- Founded: 1908
- Headquarters: Ripon, Wisconsin, United States
- Key people: Mike Schoeb - CEO
- Products: Speed Queen; UniMac; Huebsch; IPSO; Primus; Cissel (discontinued)
- Revenue: ▲US$1.71 billion (2025)
- Net income: ▲US$102 million (2025)
- Owners: BDT Capital Partners (majority stake); Teachers' Private Capital (Ontario Teacher's Pension Plan) (minority stake)
- Members: CSC ServiceWorks, Inc. (29.7% stake owned by Ontario Teacher's Pension Plan)
- Number of employees: 2,730 (2014)
- Website: alliancelaundry.com

Alliance Laundry Systems LLC is an American provider of commercial laundry systems. The company designs, manufactures, and markets a line of commercial and industrial laundry equipment under various brands in over 100 countries. Among the company's products are washers, drying tumblers and ironers for the coin laundry, multi-housing laundries, institutional laundries and laundries for consumer residences. Alliance Laundry Systems manufactures products under the brands Speed Queen, Primus, Huebsch, IPSO, and UniMac. The company was founded in 1998 and is based in Ripon, Wisconsin. However, Alliance claims Speed Queen's founding date of 1908 as the beginning for the company.

== History ==
=== Background ===
The company's precursor Barlow & Seelig Manufacturing was established in 1908 and later introduced a hand-operated washer to the marketplace. The Speed Queen brand was created in 1928 with the introduction of stainless steel wash tubs in 1939 and automatic washers and dryers in 1952. Eventually Barlow & Seelig was renamed Speed Queen Company, and was later purchased by McGraw-Edison. In 1979, McGraw-Edison sold its appliance division to Raytheon Company.

=== Formation ===
In February 1998, private equity firm Bain Capital agreed to acquire the commercial laundry business from Raytheon for $358 million. And as a result, Alliance Laundry Systems was formed.

In January 2005, Teachers' Private Capital, the private equity affiliate of the Ontario Teachers' Pension Plan acquired the majority of the equity interests of Alliance Laundry for $450 million.

In 2009, the Alliance Laundry Systems University (ALSU) was founded as a corporate university available online to authorized Alliance Laundry Systems distributors, route operators and customers.

In March 2014, the Alliance Laundry acquired Primus Laundry Equipment headquartered in Gullegem, Belgium for approx. $259.4 million.

In April 2015, it was reported that Ontario Teachers' Pension Plan was planning to sell Alliance Laundry or issue an IPO, valuing the business at $1.8 billion. Later in 2015, a majority stake was sold to BDT Capital Partners. The Pension Plan retained a minority stake in the company.

== Gallery ==
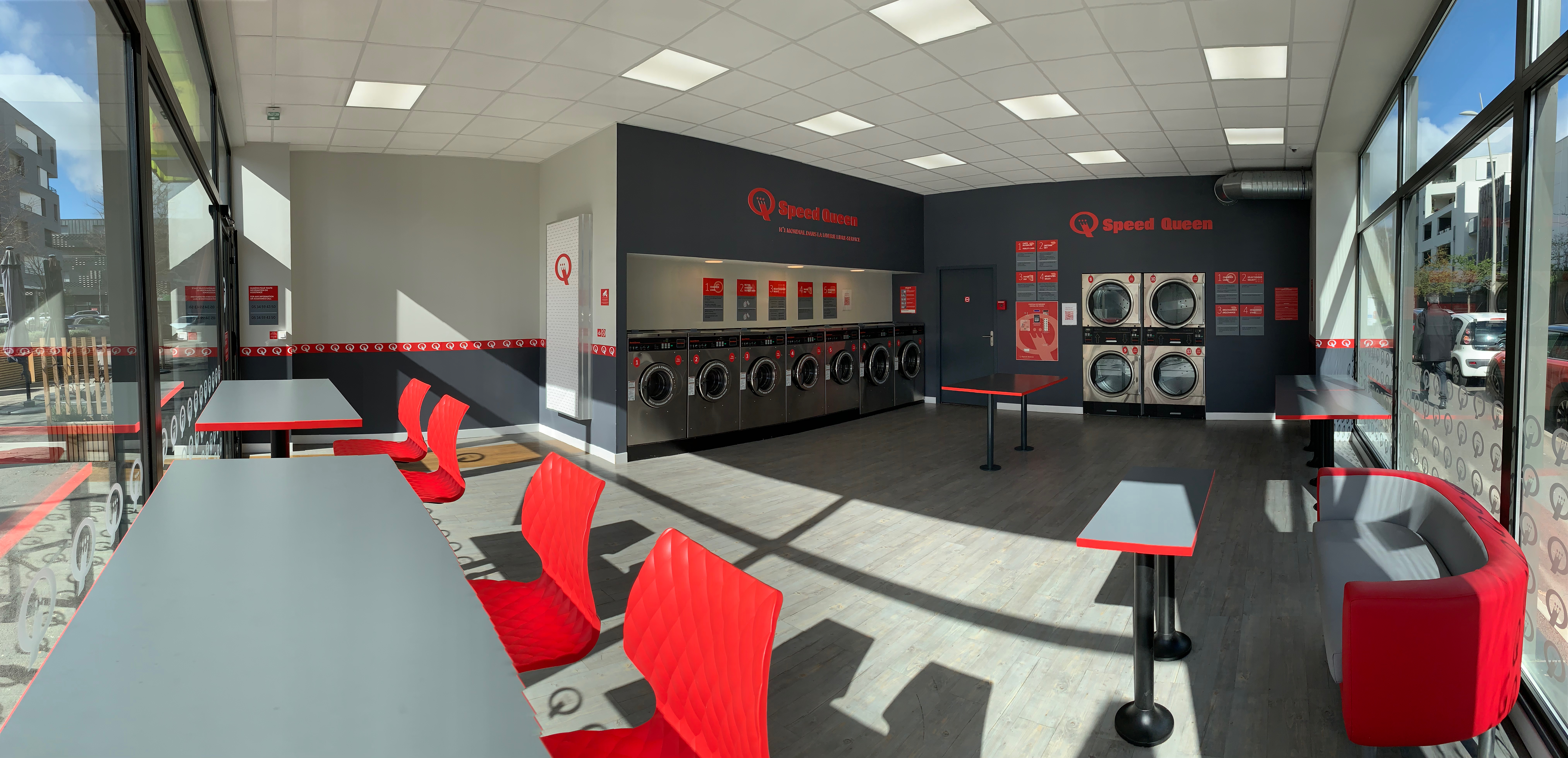
Speed Queen laundromat, France

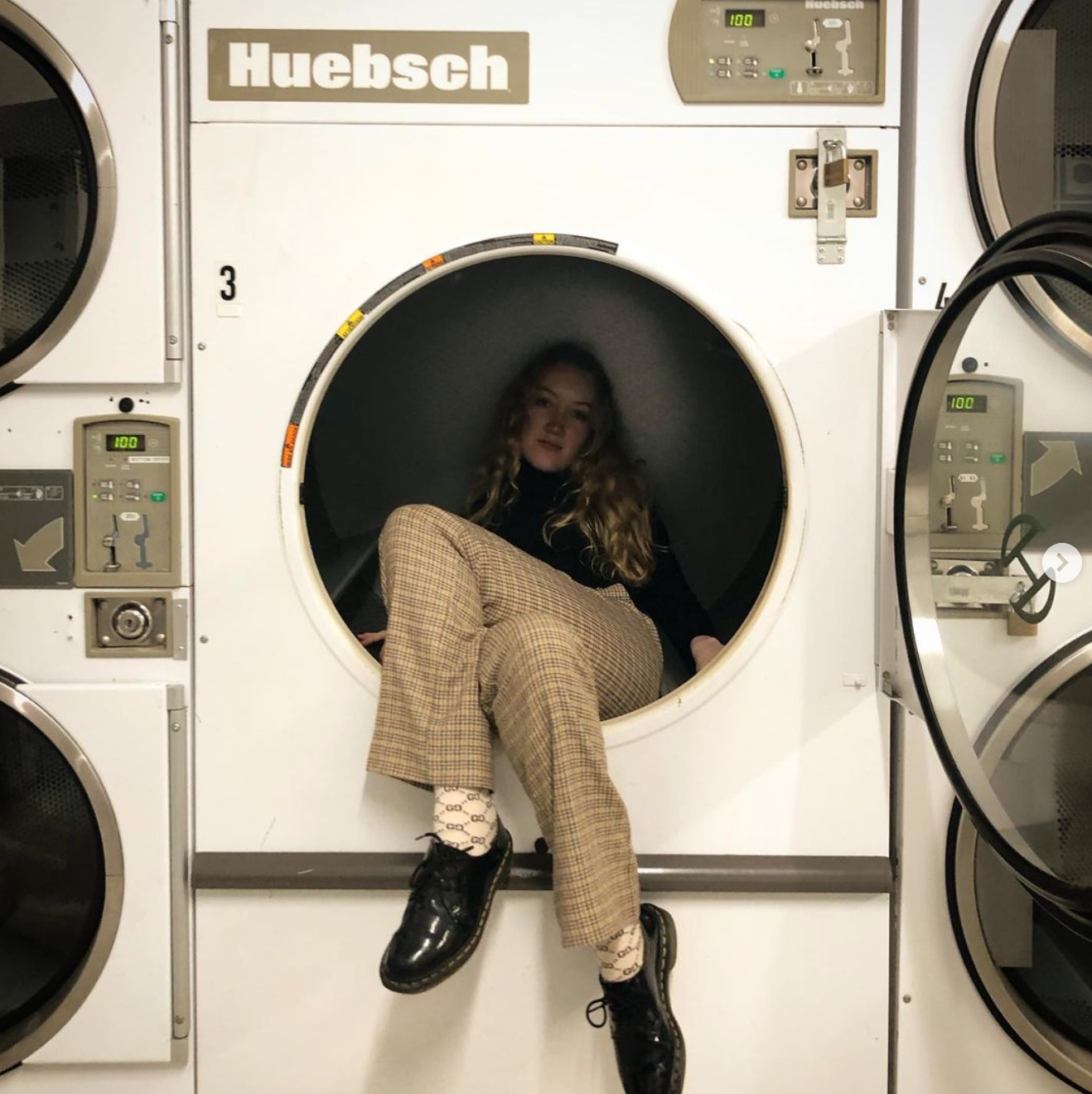
Huebsch tumbler dryer

== See also ==
- Speed Queen Ripon plant
