= Marvin Liebman =

American conservative and gay rights activist

- Born: July 21, 1923; Brooklyn, New York City, New York, U.S.
- Died: March 31, 1997 (aged 73); Washington, D.C., U.S.
- Occupations: Political activist; direct mail
- Known for: Coming Out Conservative

Marvin Liebman (July 21, 1923 – March 31, 1997) was an American conservative activist and fundraiser, and later in his life, a gay rights advocate.

== Early life ==
Liebman was raised in Brooklyn, New York, by his parents, Benjamin "Benny" Liebman and Rose Schorr. His parents were Ashkenazi Jews from Galicia, a region that at the time was part of Poland and is today part of Ukraine. Liebman recalled his youth as growing amid "a polyglot collection of middle class families". He was bar mitzvahed in September 1936. Like many other young people who came of age in the Great Depression, Liebman believed the Depression proved the failure of capitalism, causing him to be interested in communism as an alternative. While in high school, he became interested in left wing politics and joined both the American Student Union and Young Communist League. At the same time, Liebman discovered his homosexuality, which he felt deeply ashamed of, causing him to remain in "the closet".

At age 19, Liebman was drafted and served in Naples and Cairo during the final years of World War II, serving in the Army Air Corps. By his own admission, an incompetent soldier who failed in his duties as a cook, Liebman never saw action. However, like many other gay Americans in World War II, his military service was a "national coming out" as he discovered other gay men for the first time, easing his feelings of shame and self-disgust. In Italy, homosexuality was not illegal, through it was considered to be shameful, and Liebman enjoyed being part of the gay subculture in Naples, where he first had sex. While in Cairo at an Air Corps base, his commanding officer discovered a series of love letters written by Liebman that revealed his homosexuality. The officer subjected Liebman to repeated private and public humiliations, forcing him to appear before the other soldiers in his unit while his officer called him a "faggot" and a "cocksucker". Liebman was finally given a blue discharge for homosexuality in 1944. Due to his blue discharge, he was disqualified from collecting veterans' benefits.

After being sent home to New York City, Liebman met and quickly married a woman named "Patsy". Their relationship, though, was never consummated and the marriage was annulled after less than six months in June 1945. Liebman worked a variety of odd jobs while being a member of New York's gay subculture, where unlike in Naples, he was in constant danger of being arrested in police raids.

Over the next several years, Liebman became increasingly involved in Zionism, working in various volunteer and paid positions for the American League for a Free Palestine, United Jewish Appeal, Aguduth Israel and the American Fund for Israel Institutions. In 1947, he also worked with Irgun, a right-wing terrorist organization which was attempting to secure Israeli independence from Britain through a campaign of bombings aimed at the Arabs and British. During this time, Liebman began developing more conservative political views, including a passionate hatred for the Soviet Union stemming from the communist country's reportedly harsh treatment of Jewish citizens.

In 1951, Liebman met Elinor Lipper, a Russian woman who had just published her memoir, 11 Years in Soviet Prison Camps, recounting her experiences in the Gulag camps of the Kolyma. Lipper's revelation that much of the Soviet economy was based upon slave labor caused him to lose his faith in socialism as he recalled: "Her story overwhelmed me. I felt totally betrayed. What was worse, because I had believed in the Soviet Union, I felt personally responsible for what had happened to her. The change seemed quick, but it was really the culmination of five years of internal intellectual conflict that I had hidden from myself. This catharsis...was the turning point in my life".

== The China Lobby ==
In January 1952, Liebman founded a group, Aide Refugee Chinese Intellectuals (ARCI), which sought to allow the admission of 25,000 Chinese intellectual refugees languishing in refugee camps in British Hong Kong to the United States (at the time, American immigration law imposed strict quotes on the number of Asians allowed to in). Despite his conservative views, Liebman's plan to bring 25,000 Chinese intellectuals to America brought him into conflict with the right-wing nativist politicians.

After founding ARCI, Liebman discovered a talent for political organizing, applying to the right principles that were based on his experience of his "knowledge of how the left organized". The tactics that he deployed for the ARCI were subsequently used for all his political campaigns, under which he would enlist a number of prominent individuals to endorse his organization by serving as '"advisory" board members; issue letterheads with the names of these individuals attached; have a wealthy businessman serve as a treasurer and corporate fundraiser; appoint someone famous as president; and finally form a committee to "really do the work or rubber-stamp what you are doing". In this way, Liebman created organizations that were well funded with prestigious supporters that attracted attention while having a few dedicated activists being in charge. To assist ARCI, Liebman enlisted Walter Judd, a Republican congressman who once served as a Protestant missionary in China as its president. Because Generalissimo Chiang Kai-shek had converted to Methodism in 1930 after marrying his third wife, Soong Mei-ling, daughter of a Methodist minister, evangelical Protestants were the firmest supporters of the "China Lobby". As a Protestant missionary in the 1930s, Judd had witnessed the Chinese Civil War firsthand, which made him a staunch supporter of the "China Lobby".

With Judd, well known as an advocate of racial equality due to his sinophilia as well as being an anti-communist, the ARCI soon attracted generous donations from the Ford Foundation and the Rockefeller Foundation. Soon, the Department of State and the Central Intelligence Agency (CIA) were covertly funding the ACRI as Liebman found that they both wanted to "expand their intelligence network in Hong Kong", a city where many spies for Great Britain, the United States, the Soviet Union and both Chinese regimes operated. In February 1952, Liebman traveled to Hong Kong to open an office for the ACRI, which was soon besieged by thousands of refugee applications from Chinese scholars, doctors, lawyers, scientists and other intellectuals living in the refugee camps. Due to congressional opposition, Liebman switched the focus of ACRI to supporting the Kuomintang regime in Taiwan. At the same time, Liebman began to associate with the Committee for a Free Asia, a CIA-sponsored front organization that was active in a long stretch of Asia from Japan to Pakistan. Eager to work for the CIA, in 1952 he took a briefcase of cash worth $25,000 to Hong Kong to pay for anti-Communist pamphlets that were to be smuggled over the border to the People's Republic of China. In the early 1950s, he was a leader of the so-called "China Lobby", serving as secretary of the Committee of One Million Against the Admission of Red China to the United Nations. After 1949, Taiwan's government continued to hold China's seat at the United Nations (UN), and many world governments felt that China's seat should be given to communist China. The ideological basis of this organization was that the Kuomintang's defeat in the Chinese Civil War was only temporary, and that from his base in Taiwan, Generalissimo Chiang Kai-shek would one day return in triumph to reclaim the mainland of China and end the rule of the "Red rebels" who had defeated him in 1949. As such, it argued that it was proper for the Republic of China continued to hold China's UN seat since the People's Republic was merely an illegitimate regime which was just "temporarily" controlling the mainland of China. Founded in 1953, the Committee of One Million survived until the accession of the People's Republic of China to the United Nations in 1971, with Lee Edwards taking over as secretary from Liebman in 1969. The Committee of One Million, which took its name from a petition Liebman organized and was supposedly signed by one million Americans, became the premier organization of the "China Lobby". Much of the literature produced by the Committee of One Million was more anti-Communist than pro-Kuomintang, as Liebman found it easier to denounce the People's Republic rather than glorify the Republic of China.

In 1957, he founded Marvin Liebman Associates, Inc. For the next 11 years, Liebman's firm developed direct mail fundraising programs and provided public relations expertise to the anti-communist and conservative movements in the U.S. and abroad. Its extensive list of clients included the Committee of One Million, Aid Refugee Chinese Intellectuals, the American Emergency Committee for Tibetan Refugees, the American-Asian Educational Exchange, the American African Affairs Association, and the American Committee for Aid to Katanga Freedom Fighters. In addition, Liebman was an early supporter and co-founder of Young Americans for Freedom and the American Conservative Union.

== International Cold Warrior ==
In May 1957, Liebman attended the third summit of the Asian People's Anti-Communist League in Saigon. Though ostensibly a grass-roots organization, the Asian People's Anti-Communist League was in reality created and controlled by the intelligence services of South Korea, Taiwan, the Philippines, and South Vietnam. The purpose of the Asian People's Anti-Communist League was, as its founding charter put, to wage "political and psychological warfare" against communism in Asia. The preferred methods of the League were as its pamphlets described it: "infiltration, instigation, economic manipulation, public demonstrations, terrorism, subversion, guerrilla warfare and assassination". The chairman of the League, Ku Cheng-kang, was a member of the Kuomintang's Supreme National Defense Council and was an adviser to Chiang. As the League was against the non-alignment concept championed by several Asian leaders such as Jawaharlal Nehru of India and Sukarno of Indonesia under which the Third World nations were to be neutral in the Cold War, instead advocating that for an alliance of Asian states with the United States, the League was approved by the U.S. government. However, some of the League's activities such as the attempts to provoke guerrilla war in China went beyond what the U.S. government was willing to contemplate. In an attempt to find more allies, the League reached out to the Anti-Bolshevik Bloc of Nations, an alliance of anti-Communist emigres from Eastern Europe founded by Nazi Germany in 1943 which continued after the war. The leader of the Bloc was Yaroslav Stetsko, one of the leaders of the Organization of Ukrainian Nationalists (OUN), an anti-Semitic Ukrainian nationalist group which had collaborated with Germany during World War II and whose members had killed hundreds of thousands of Ukrainian Jews. The Bloc was committed to starting a guerrilla war in the Soviet Union, an idea that had received support from the CIA and MI6 for a time, but by the middle of the 1950s, both American and British intelligence had written off the Bloc as the attempts to parachute agents into the Soviet Union always ended in failure.

As the Asian People's Anti-Communist League was funded by the governments of Taiwan, South Korea, the Philippines, and South Vietnam, Stesko hoped that the Asian governments would also finance the Bloc. At the same, there was a third group, the Inter-American Confederation for the Defense of the Continent founded by Mexican politician Jorge Prieto Laurens to combat communism in Latin America. The Confederation's most notable member was Admiral Carlos Penna Botto of Brazil, who had been forced to retire in World War II for his pro-Axis views, and who believed the Soviet Union had taken control of Brazil. Liebman became active as an emissary hoping to bring the Committee of One Million, the League, the Bloc and the Confederation together to form a world-wide anti-Communist group.

In 1958, Liebman also became general secretary of a steering committee announced in Mexico City to explore the possibility of combining the Asian People's Anti-Communist League with its own Latin American offshoot to form what eventually became the World Anti-Communist League. In March 1958 at a conference in Mexico City, the League, the Bloc, the Confederation and the Committee of One Million united to form the World Anti-Communist Congress for Liberation and Freedom. The Congress promised to unite people of "all races, nationalities, countries, and creeds" to "unify our programs, coordinate our work, and take progressive actions against our Communist enemy". The Congress was notable for its anti-imperialist tone, claiming that the European nations had embarked on wars of conquest starting in 16th century and described the Soviet Union as merely the most brutal and imperialistic of all the European nations. At the same time, the Congress was also hostile towards left-wing nationalists in the Third World, claiming that were merely dupes being used by the Soviet Union to further its own imperialism. The goal of the Congress was to render "moral and material support to forces behind the Iron Curtain in Europe and Asia" and to "achieve the ultimate objective of liberating and restoring national independence, freedom and liberty to all the enslaved peoples on their ethnic territories". At the time, Liebman stated that was the first time that "independent anticommunist organizations jointly approved and, indeed, sponsored a workable plan leading towards coordinated international action".

By July 1958, the Congress had fallen apart and Liebman pulled out the Committee of One Million, saying he did not wish to associate with Stetsko or Prieto Laurens again. Liebman was shocked to learn that Stetsko as one of the OUN commanders had been involved in the Holocaust, organizing pogroms against Jews in Galicia in 1941. Besides Stetsko, Liebman had serious difficulties with Laurens as he recalled: "The moment Laurens got the money, he started to take over. I discovered too that his internationalist anticommunist connections were with the most extreme right-wing organizations, many anti-Semitic". Liebman learned that the other groups were only interested in using the Committee of One Million's connections to lobby American politicians and he lamented he "had lost control to a bunch of jerks". After he pulled the Committee of One Million out of the Congress, he began to receive death threats from the OUN members calling him a "Jew Bolshevik".

In the 1960s, Liebman's interests started to shift from Asia to Africa. He was the founder of the American Committee for Aid to Katanga Freedom Fighters (ACAKFF), which announced its existence on 14 December 1961 with a full-page ad in The New York Times declaring "Katanga is the Hungary of 1961". The ad declared: "In resisting the UN aggression, the people of Katanga are the true Freedom Fighters not only for their own liberties, but for the cause of world freedom". Before 1960, American conservatives had little interest in the Congo and the cause of Katanga attracted passionate support from the American right more because of whom the enemies of Katanga were than because of Katanga itself. In a column, James Burnham wrote that what African nationalists really wanted was "to destroy the power and privileges of the white men; to take over their property, or most of it; and to permit white men to remain only as servants and handmaids", causing him to side with Katanga, where whites remained the dominant element. To off-set the charge of racism as many felt the break-away state of Katanga was a front for Belgian mining companies, Liebman had a black man, Max Yergan, appointed president of the ACAKFF.

In 1965, under the leadership of Ian Smith, the self-governing British colony of Southern Rhodesia declared independence. To support Rhodesia, Liebman founded in 1966 the American African Affairs Association (AAAA). The AAAA was virtually the same organization as the ACAKFF with both groups having Yergan as president, virtually identical letter-heads, the same mailing lists, and the same address in New York. At the same time, it was revealed that the Rhodesian government had hired the firm of Marvin Liebman Associates to improve its image in the United States. Starting in 1966, Liebman organized tours of Rhodesia for conservative journalists who wrote articles declaring the black majority were a contended and happy people living under the white supremacist government which had imposed a firm, but paternalist regime. In November 1966, the AAAA published a map in The New York Herald Tribune entitled "Sovereignty ... and Strife" listing all of the newly African nations which had experienced coups and civil wars in the last year, with the implication that to allow color-blind voting in Rhodesia would be to invite chaos. The AAAA and other groups of the Rhodesia Lobby were worked closely with Senator James Eastland, a conservative Southern Democrat well known for his white supremacist views to pressure the U.S. government to not expel Rhodesian diplomats operating in the United States despite United Nations Resolution 253, which asked all UN members to deny entry to supporters of Rhodesia. The Rhodesia lobby failed to pressure the United States to recognize Rhodesia, but in 1971 they were successful in pressuring Congress to pass the Byrd Amendment under which the United States would violate UN sanctions and continue to trade with Rhodesia.

Towards the end of the 1960s, Liebman became exhausted with his New York-based political activities, moved to London, and began a short career in theater production. From 1969 to 1975, he was managing director of Sedgemoor Productions. During this period, he produced or co-produced nine West End productions, an equal number of touring or out-of-town productions, two television films, and three feature films. After the dissolution of the Committee of One Million, a number of its former members joined Liebman in the American-Chilean Council.

In 1975, Liebman returned to New York City to organize Marvin Liebman Inc, a firm with the same mission as his earlier Marvin Liebman Associates. Among the notable clients were the Friends of Free China, the Friends of Jim Buckley, the Committee of Single Taxpayers, the American-Chilean Council, the Ad Hoc Citizens Legal Defense Fund for the FBI, Firing Line and Covenant House.

Like many other American conservatives in the 1960s and 1970s, Liebman strongly identified with the white supremacist government of Rhodesia, which was seen by them as heroically upholding "Western values" against the black guerrillas of the Zimbabwe People's Revolutionary Army (ZIPRA), which was supported by the Soviet Union and Zimbabwe African National Liberation Army (ZANLA), which was supported by China. Together with the conservative publisher William Rusher and a former CIA officer, David Atlee Phillips, Liebman founded a pro-Rhodesian lobbying group in 1976 called the American-Rhodesian Association, which lobbied the U.S. government to do more to support Rhodesia. Despite its public claim to be working independently of Rhodesia, the American-Rhodesian Association worked closely with the Information Office of the Rhodesian government, engaging in propaganda that downplayed the racism that black Rhodesians had to endure while playing up the image of the guerrillas of ZIPRA and ZANLA as fanatical communists. In its propaganda, the American-Rhodesian Association argued there was a special bond between white Americans and white Rhodesians, portraying both as rugged and tough pioneers who conquered harsh landscapes while defeating the indigenous "savages" such as the Indians and the Africans to carve out "civilization". The Information Office also recruited white American veterans of the Vietnam War to enlist in the Rhodesian military, portraying the war for Rhodesia as part of the same fight against communism that the United States had fought in Vietnam. He enjoyed a long-time friendship with William F. Buckley Jr. and his family. Liebman viewed Buckley as an inspiring mentor. Despite being born into the Jewish faith, under Buckley's guidance Liebman had converted to Catholicism. At his baptism, Buckley served as Liebman's godfather and Buckley's sister Priscilla served as his godmother.

With Ronald Reagan's presidential victory in 1980, Liebman was appointed to various governmental positions. He was Consultant to the Office of Policy and Planning for Action from June through October 1981, consultant to the Office of Public Affairs for the U.S. Department of Education from October 1981 to February 1982 and director of the Office of Public Affairs and director of special projects for the National Endowment of the Arts from February 1982 to July 1987. He later served as director of special projects and acting director for the Office of Public Affairs at the National Endowment for the Arts.

== Later life ==
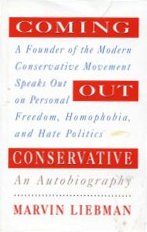
The cover to Coming Out Conservative.

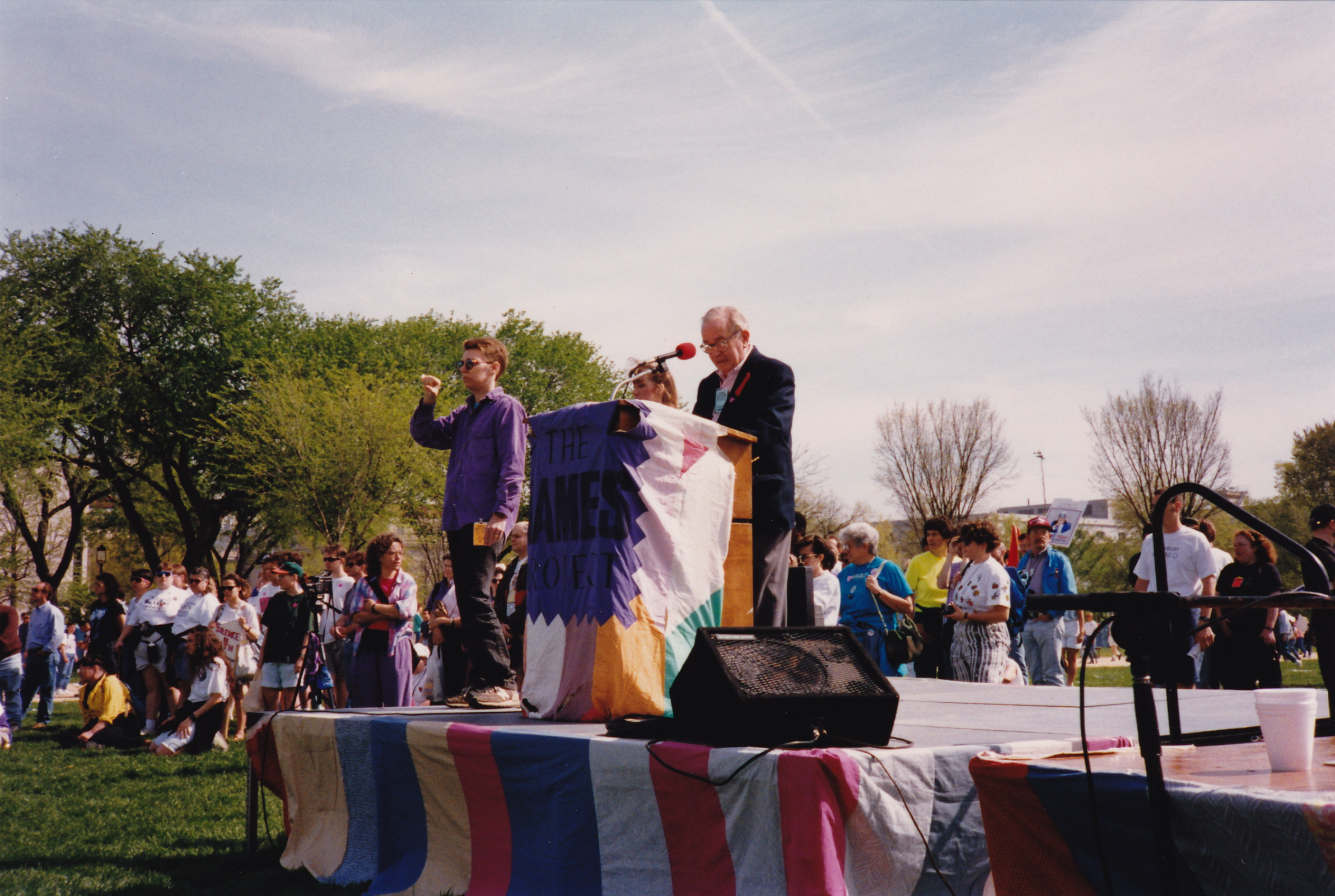
Liebman at the 1993 March on Washington for Lesbian, Gay, and Bi Equal Rights and Liberation.

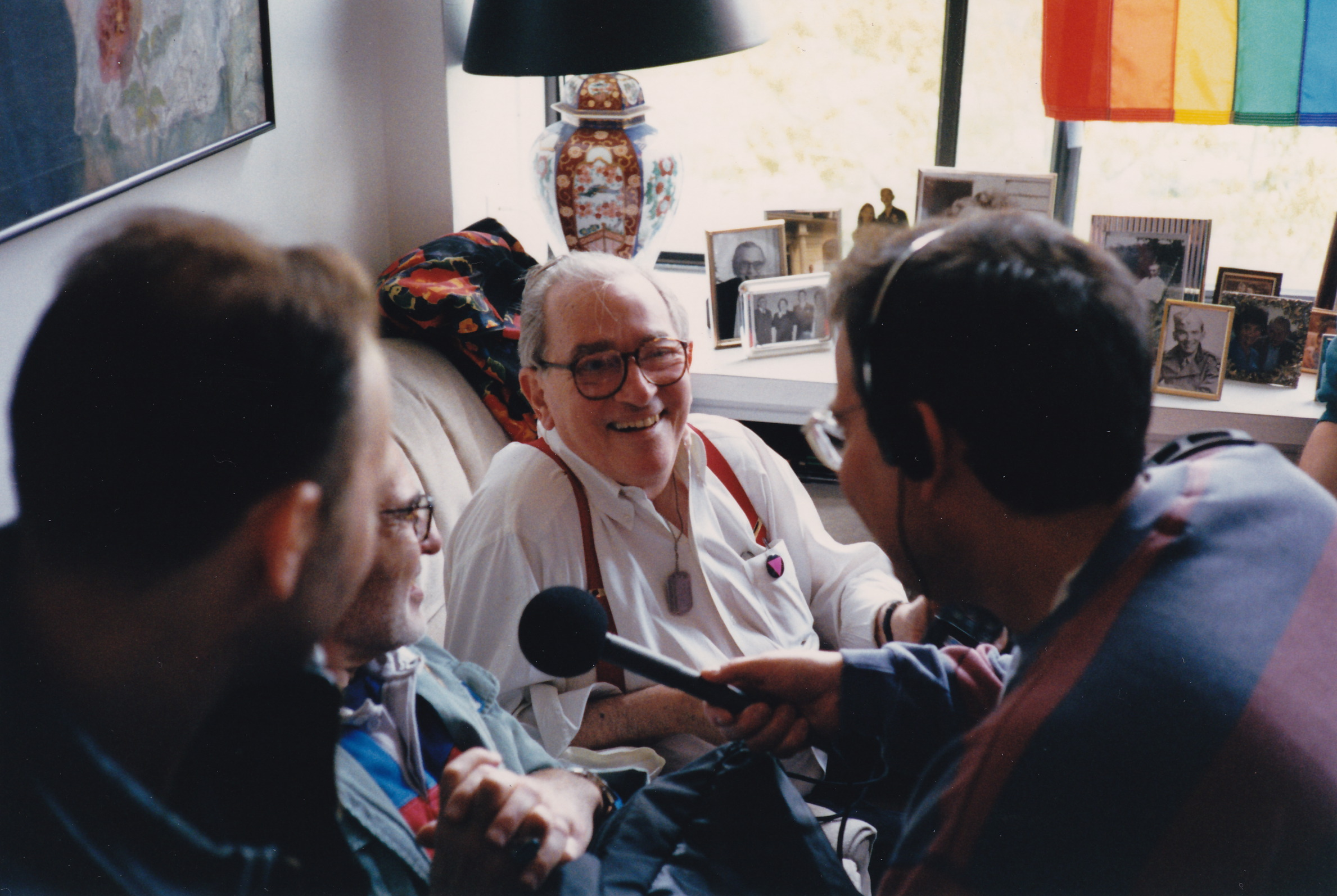
Liebman at his home giving an interview with activist Larry Kramer in 1993.

In July 1990, Liebman shed a lifetime of closeted living after writing a coming-out letter to William F. Buckley, Jr., who was then editor-in-chief of the National Review. "I am almost 67 years old," he told Buckley. "For more than half my lifetime I have been engaged in, and indeed helped to organize and maintain, the conservative and anti-communist cause...the Conservative Party of New York...the Goldwater and Reagan campaigns...All the time I labored in the conservative vineyard, I was gay." Liebman contended to Buckley that his efforts to detoxify American conservatism had not been entirely successful as he wrote "political gay bashing, racism and anti-Semitism" were continuing "even in this golden period of conservatism's great triumphs".

Liebman's personal letter to Buckley was followed up by an interview printed in The Advocate, where he expressed his disgust at the increasing influence of the Christian right within the Republican Party as the Cold War came to an end. He believed that homophobia was becoming the new basis for organizing conservative groups in the U.S., now that anti-communist sentiments were becoming less relevant. His autobiography, Coming Out Conservative, was published in 1992. In the book, he said that within the Republican Party he had begun to "feel like a Jew in Germany in 1934 who had chosen to remain silent, hoping to be able to stay invisible as he watched the beginning of the Holocaust." Over the next five years he became an outspoken advocate of gay and lesbian rights in the U.S., writing numerous articles and traveling the country to speak at various meetings and rallies.

Although he initially labeled himself a moderate Republican and worked to support gay-friendly conservative groups, including Log Cabin Republicans, he eventually concluded that he could no longer self-identify as a fund raiser for or supporter of any conservative group because of the increasingly anti-LGBT rhetoric of the political right. Liebman stated in 1992 that: "To be gay, conservative and Republican is not a contradiction. I'm proud to be all three. One of the more important slogans of the gay and lesbian community is, 'We are everywhere.' We are everywhere – except as an open and accepted presence in the Republican Party. As far as some Republicans are concerned, we exist not as human beings but rather as symbols of unspeakable evil and objects of hatred, bigotry and fear." Liebman also later renounced his ties to Catholicism, arguing that the homophobia of the Catholic Church meant he could not in good conscience continue to subscribe to Catholic dogma. In the final years of his life, he chose to describe himself as an "independent".

In a 1995 column, Liebman wrote: "I cannot associate myself with Rush Limbaugh and other new "conservative" leaders, nor with Pat Robertson and his "Christian" brigades, nor with Jesse Helms and his new "Republican" majority. The only identity of which I am absolutely certain is that I am a homosexual in a country which has little patience with us gay folk...In the past-and sometimes to the consternation of my African-American friends-I have compared the gay rights movement to the black civil rights movement of the 60s. I still believe that they are comparable, and we have much to learn from the history of this great quest, both from its setbacks and its victories. Now, however, I believe it even more urgent to draw a comparison between our community and the Jews and homosexuals of Europe in the 30s and 40s. Then, as now, the majority cried out that those who predicted death and misery were crazy, that such things as mass extermination could not happen, that hysteria was dangerous. Until the very last, until they choked on the lethal gas in the extermination "showers", they did not accept the fact that the Nazi state despised them to the point of eradicating them from the face of the earth".

He died of heart failure on March 31, 1997.

His papers are held by the New York Public Library.

== See also ==
- Sexual orientation and the United States military
