= McGraw-Edison =

American manufacturer of electrical equipment

Coordinates: 42.2518499°N 84.7345924°W

McGraw-Edison Company
- Industry: Electrical equipment
- Founded: 1957
- Founders: Charles Edison; Max McGraw
- Defunct: 1985
- Fate: Acquired by Cooper Industries
- Headquarters: United States

McGraw-Edison was an American manufacturer of electrical equipment. It was created in 1957 through a merger of McGraw Electric and Thomas A. Edison, Inc., which was in turn acquired by Cooper Industries in 1985. The McGraw-Edison brand is seen on industrial, commercial, and institutional lighting products, and has been owned by Pennsylvania Transformer Technologies, Inc. since 1996. At the time of its acquisition, the company had 21,000 employees working in 118 facilities.

== Origins ==
McGraw Electric was founded by Max McGraw in Sioux City, Iowa in 1900, in the business of installing electricity in houses. The founder was aged 17 at the time. The company quickly expanded into industrial and commercial buildings. It made several acquisitions over the years, evolving into a manufacturer of electrical products. In 1952 McGraw Electric and the Pennsylvania Transformer Company merged, keeping the name of McGraw Electric. Thomas A. Edison, Inc. was formed in 1910 as a reorganization of the Edison Manufacturing Co., which had its roots in the 19th century. Edison began with the manufacture of phonographs and records, and later made radios and dictation machines. Charles Edison became president of the company in 1927, and ran it until it was sold in 1957, when it merged with the McGraw Electric Company.

== History ==
McGraw-Edison Co. was created in 1957 when the McGraw Electric Company acquired Thomas A. Edison, Inc. Charles Edison became board chairman of the merged company until he retired in 1961. Max McGraw was chief operating executive. In March 1957, McGraw-Edison acquired Griswold Manufacturing. Griswold manufactured cast-iron cookware and some electrical items. Later that year, the Griswold brand and housewares division were sold to the Wagner Manufacturing Company of Sidney, Ohio. In 1959, Al Bersted became president of McGraw-Edison with responsibility for overseeing day-to-day operations. Max McGraw continued as chairman of the executive committee.

McGraw-Edison took over the power-tool businesses of General Electric in 1969 and of G.W. Murphy Industries in 1972. In September 1979, McGraw-Edison purchased Studebaker-Worthington, a company formed from a merger of Studebaker and the Worthington Corporation. The automaker Studebaker had been founded in 1852 as a blacksmithing and wagon-building company by Clement Studebaker and his brother Henry. Meanwhile, Worthington had been founded by Henry Rossiter Worthington, the inventor of the direct-acting steam pump. The two companies had merged with Wagner Electric in 1967 to form Studebaker-Worthington. The purchase of this agglomerated firm more than doubled the size of McGraw-Edison. Also, in 1979, McGraw-Edison sold its appliance division (which owns the Speed Queen brand) to Raytheon Company. This former appliance division is now part of Alliance Laundry Systems.

In June 1980, Bastian-Blessing, soon to merge with Nytronics, Inc., acquired McGraw-Edison's food service equipment division. In September 1980, the company sold its power tool division to Shopsmith, Inc. McGraw-Edison manufactured equipment such as air conditioners, cooling fans, electric space heaters, air humidifiers, portable hair dryers, toasters and other household appliances at their 24 acres (9.7 ha) site in Calhoun County, Michigan between 1958 and 1980.

During its operations between 1970 and 1980, the company spread about 15,000 US gallons (57,000 L; 12,000 imp gal) of oil waste contaminated with trichloroethylene (TCE) to control dust on the site's dirt roads. In 1980, TCE contamination was found in nearby residential and municipal wells. The State of Michigan and McGraw-Edison Corporation registered a consent decree on June 11, 1984 for clean-up of the contaminated soil and groundwater.

McGraw-Edison was acquired by Cooper Industries of Texas in 1985. At the time of the take-over, McGraw-Edison had 21,000 employees working in 118 facilities in the United States and other countries. Cooper took over responsibility for the Calhoun County site clean-up, and as of 2004 the remedies were reported to be functioning well.
