= Brightspeed of West Missouri =

Telephone operating company

Brightspeed of West Missouri, LLC
- Company type: Subsidiary
- Industry: Telecommunications
- Founded: 1929
- Products: Local Telephone Service
- Parent: United/Sprint Nextel (1929-2006); Embarq (2006-2009); CenturyLink/Lumen (2009-2022); Brightspeed (2022–present)
- Website: http://www.brightspeed.com/

Brightspeed of West Missouri, LLC is a telephone operating company providing local telephone services in Kansas and Missouri owned by Brightspeed.

== History ==
The company was established in 1929 as The United Telephone Company, later changing its name to United Telephone Company of Missouri upon expansion of the United Telephone System. It was owned by United Utilities.

United Utilities later became United Telecommunications in 1972, and acquired Sprint Long Distance from GTE in the 1980s. The company later became Sprint Corporation and United Telephone of Missouri then became Sprint Missouri, Inc., operating as part of the Sprint Local Telecommunications Division.

Sprint Corporation, in 2005, acquired Nextel and changed its name to Sprint Nextel Corporation. The company spun off its local wireline assets into a separate company in 2006 as Embarq Corporation. Sprint Missouri then became Embarq Missouri, Inc.

Embarq was acquired by CenturyTel in 2009, which in 2010 changed its name to CenturyLink. This brought all the lines formerly owned by both United Telecom/Sprint and GTE within the state of Missouri under ownership of the same company, as CenturyTel had previously purchased the former GTE Midwest lines in the state from Verizon in 2002, forming CenturyTel of Missouri; however both it and Embarq Missouri remained separate operating companies within CenturyLink. Embarq Missouri at that point began doing business under the CenturyLink name.

=== Sale ===
On August 3, 2021, Lumen announced the sale of its local telephone assets in 20 states to Apollo Global Management, including Kansas and Missouri. Apollo formed a subsidiary called Brightspeed to acquire the assets from Lumen. The sale to Apollo closed on October 3, 2022.

On June 9, 2023, Embarq Missouri was merged into a new operating company, Brightspeed of West Missouri.
