= Brightspeed of Texas =

Telephone operating company

Brightspeed of Texas, Inc.
- Formerly: Central Telephone Company of Texas (1956-2022)
- Company type: Subsidiary
- Industry: Telecommunications
- Founded: 1956; 70 years ago
- Products: Local Telephone Service Internet
- Parent: Centel (1956-1992); Sprint Nextel (1992-2006); Embarq (2006-2009); CenturyLink/Lumen (2009-2022); Brightspeed (2022-present)
- Website: www.brightspeed.com/local/tx

Brightspeed of Texas, Inc. is a telephone operating company owned by Brightspeed that provides local telephone and internet service in Texas. The company serves communities in Texas such as Killeen, Copperas Cove, Athens, Gatesville, Harker Heights, Humble, Hutto, Kingwood, Porter, San Marcos, Stephenville, and Tyler.

== History ==
Brightspeed of Texas was founded in 1956 as Central Telephone of Texas, a subsidiary of Centel. In 1992, Centel was acquired by Sprint, and Central of Texas began doing business under the Sprint name, but retained its legal name.

In 2006, the company was spun off into Embarq when Sprint Nextel spun off its local telephone operations.

The company did business as CenturyLink from 2009-2022, following the acquisition of Embarq by CenturyTel.

=== Sale to Brightspeed ===
On August 3, 2021, Lumen announced its sale of its local telephone assets in 20 states to Apollo Global Management, including Texas. Apollo announced the company acquiring the Lumen assets would trade under the name "Brightspeed". The sale closed on October 3, 2022. Central of Texas was then renamed Brightspeed of Texas.
