= Brightspeed of Eastern Kansas =

Brightspeed of Eastern Kansas, Inc.
- Company type: Private (Subsidiary of Brightspeed)
- Industry: Telecommunications
- Founded: 1927
- Products: Local Telephone Service
- Parent: United/Sprint Nextel (1988-2006); Embarq (2006-2009); Lumen Technologies (2009-2022); Brightspeed (2022-present)

Brightspeed of Eastern Kansas, Inc. is one of several Brightspeed companies providing local telephone service in Kansas. Kansas towns that Brightspeed of Eastern Kansas serves include Sterling, Lebo, Gardner, and Nortonville.

== History ==
The current company was founded in 1927 and became United Telephone Company of Iowa. In 1988, the company acquired exchanges in Kansas, exited Iowa, and changed its name to United Telephone Company of Eastern Kansas. In 1991, parent company United Telecom took the name Sprint Corporation after acquiring the Sprint Long Distance service network, but the local operating company's name did not change.

Following Sprint's merger with Nextel to become Sprint Nextel, in 2006 Sprint's local wireline operations were spun-off to form the new company Embarq. Three years later Embarq merged with CenturyTel to form CenturyLink. In 2020, the parent company took the name Lumen Technologies to emphasize their enterprise business operations; local phone operations continue under he CenturyLink name.

On August 3, 2021, Lumen announced its sale of its local telephone assets in 20 states to Apollo Global Management, including Kansas.

The sale to Apollo closed on October 3, 2022, with the new company called Brightspeed.
