= Embarq (disambiguation) =

Embarq Corporation or Embarq Holdings Company LLC, a telecommunications company based in Overland Park, Kansas.

Embarq may also refer to:

- Individual operating companies of the aforementioned company:
  - Embarq Florida
  - Embarq Minnesota
  - Embarq Missouri
- The EMBARQ Network, a center within the World Resources Institute, Washington, D.C.

== See also ==
- Embarkation (disambiguation)
