= CenturyLink of Florida =

CenturyLink of Florida, Inc.
- Type: Subsidiary
- Industry: Telecommunications
- Founded: 1925; 101 years ago
- Products: Local Telephone Service
- Parent: United Utilities/Sprint/Sprint Nextel (1925-2006); Embarq (2006-2009); CenturyLink/Lumen (2009-present)
- Website: http://www.centurylink.com/

CenturyLink of Florida, Inc. is a telephone operating company providing local telephone services in Florida owned by Lumen Technologies.

The company was established in 1925, later changing its name to United Telephone Company of Florida upon expansion of the United Telephone System. It was owned by United Utilities.

United Utilities later became United Telecom, and fully acquired the Sprint long-distance network from GTE. The company changed its name to Sprint Corporation in 1991. The company changed its name to Sprint-Florida, Inc. in 1996. Later, the Central Telephone Company of Florida was merged into Sprint-Florida, which was internally transferred to the control of Central Telephone Company, a former subsidiary of Centel, which had been acquired by Sprint in 1993.

In 2005, Sprint Corporation acquired Nextel and changed its name to Sprint Nextel Corporation. The following year, the company spun off its wireline assets into a separate company named Embarq Corporation. Sprint-Florida then became Embarq Florida, Inc.

Embarq was acquired by CenturyTel in 2009, which in 2010 changed its name to CenturyLink. Embarq Florida began doing business under the CenturyLink name.

Embarq Florida’s legal name was changed in 2022 to CenturyLink of Florida, Inc., as it was retained by Lumen following the sale of most ex-Embarq operating companies to Brightspeed. Since Central Telephone as a legal entity was included in the sale to Brightspeed, the ownership of CenturyLink of Florida was transferred to another subsidiary within Lumen.
