= Central Telephone Company of Virginia =

Telephone company in Virginia, United States

Century Telephone Company of Virginia
- Type: Subsidiary
- Industry: Telecommunications
- Founded: 1971; 55 years ago
- Products: Local Telephone Service
- Parent: Centel (1971-1992); Sprint Nextel (1992-2006); Embarq (2006-2009); Lumen (2009-2022); Brightspeed (2022–present)
- Website: http://www.centurylink.com/

Central Telephone Company of Virginia is a telephone company owned by Brightspeed that provides a local telephone service within the commonwealth of Virginia, USA.

== History ==
The company was founded in 1971 under the ownership of Centel. The latter company was acquired by Sprint in 1992. The company remained in Sprint hands until 2006 when its local telephone operations were spun off as Embarq. In 2009, Embarq was acquired by CenturyTel, becoming CenturyLink in 2010.

=== Sale ===
On August 3, 2021, Lumen announced its sale of its local telephone assets in 20 states to Apollo Global Management, including Virginia. The sale closed on October 3, 2022, with the new company taking the name Brightspeed.
