= Carolina Telephone & Telegraph =

Carolina Telephone and Telegraph Company is a local telephone operating company. Formerly a subsidiary of United Telecom/Sprint and later Embarq and CenturyLink, through various mergers and spinoffs it is now a subsidiary of Brightspeed.

== Service area ==
Carolina Telephone's service area generally covered most of North Carolina east of Interstate 95 with the exception of areas around Wilmington and Goldsboro and areas south of U.S. Route 74. The company also served customers in the Sandhills and eastern Piedmont of North Carolina, primarily south and west of Raleigh. The company additionally had an outlying pocket of customers in the Kernersville area of eastern Forsyth County.
