= CenturyLink of Nevada =

American telecommunications subsidiary

CenturyLink of Nevada, LLC
- Type: Subsidiary
- Industry: Telecommunications
- Founded: 1971; 55 years ago
- Headquarters: Nevada
- Products: Local Telephone Service
- Parent: Centel (1971-1992); Sprint Nextel (1992-2006); Embarq (2006-2009); CenturyLink/Lumen (2009-present)
- Website: http://www.centurylink.com/

CenturyLink of Nevada, LLC, formerly the Central Telephone Company is a telephone operating company owned by Lumen Technologies that provides local telephone service in portions of Nevada. Its largest market is Las Vegas

== History ==
The company was established in 1971 as a subsidiary of Centel providing service in parts of North Carolina, Florida, and Nevada. In 1992, Centel was acquired by Sprint, which merged Centel's Florida operations into its existing Florida subsidiary, but the Central Telephone Company retained its corporate name and North Carolina and Nevada operations. In 2006, Sprint spun off its local telephone business as Embarq, which was then acquired by CenturyTel (now Lumen Technologies) in 2009.

=== Sale of North Carolina assets ===
On August 3, 2021, Lumen announced its sale of its ILEC telephone assets in 20 states to Apollo Global Management, including North Carolina. The divested assets now operate as Brightspeed. Lumen continues to provide services in Nevada through CenturyLink of Nevada.
