= Brightspeed of Kansas =

American telephone company

Brightspeed of Kansas, Inc.
- Type: Private (subsidiary of Brightspeed)
- Industry: Telecommunications
- Founded: 1909
- Headquarters: Overland Park, Kansas, U.S.
- Products: Local Telephone Service
- Parent: United/Sprint Nextel (until 2006); Embarq (2006–2009); CenturyLink/Lumen (2009–2022); Brightspeed (2022–present)
- Website: www.centurylink.com

Brightspeed of Kansas, Inc., formerly United Telephone Company of Kansas, is one of several Brightspeed subsidiaries providing local telephone service in Kansas. Kansas towns that Brightspeed of Kansas serves include Junction City, Burlington, Hillsboro, Sterling and Garnett.

== History of Brightspeed ==
The company was founded in 1909 as The American Telephone Company. It was owned by Sprint Nextel until 2006 when it was spun off into Embarq. CenturyTel acquired Embarq in 2009, at which point United Telephone of Kansas began doing business as CenturyLink. CenturyLink was renamed Lumen Technologies in 2020.

=== Sale ===
On August 3, 2021, Lumen announced its sale of its local telephone assets in 20 states to Apollo Global Management, including Kansas.

The sale to Apollo closed on October 3, 2022.
