= CenturyTel of South Arkansas =

CenturyTel of South Arkansas, Inc.
- Type: Private (Subsidiary of CenturyLink)
- Industry: Telecommunications
- Founded: 1961
- Products: Local Telephone Service
- Parent: Brightspeed
- Website: http://www.brightspeed.com/

CenturyTel of South Arkansas, Inc. is a telephone operating company of Brightspeed providing local telephone services to Dodge City and Junction City in Arkansas and South Dodge City and South Junction City in Louisiana

The company was founded in 1961 as the Union Telephone Company, Inc. Clarke Williams acquired the company, along with what is now CenturyTel of Arkansas, in 1962, later becoming part of his company Central Telephone and Electronics, then Century Telephone Enterprises. The Union Telephone Company, in 1995, became Century Telephone of South Arkansas, Inc. The company adopted its current name in 1998.

The company was among the local operating companies sold in 2022 to form Brightspeed. The purchase closed on October 3, 2022.
