= Brightspeed of Northcentral Ohio =

US telephone company founded 1977

Brightspeed of Northcentral Ohio, Inc.
- Company type: Private (Subsidiary of CenturyLink)
- Industry: Telecommunications
- Founded: 1977
- Headquarters: Lorain, OH, United States
- Products: Local Telephone Service
- Parent: Centel (until 1992); CenturyTel/CenturyLink/Lumen (1992-2022); Brightspeed (2022-present)
- Website: https://www.centurylink.com/

Brightspeed of Northcentral Ohio, Inc., is a telephone operating company owned by Brightspeed that provides local telephone service in Ohio, including Amherst, Lorain, and Vermillion.

The company was established in 1977 as the Lorain Telephone Company. The company was acquired by Centel and changed its corporate name to Central Telephone Company of Ohio. In 1992, the company was sold to Century Telephone and changed its name to Century Telephone of Ohio, Inc. In 1998, Century Telephone shortened its name to CenturyTel and the Ohio company changed its corporate name to CenturyTel of Ohio, Inc.

On August 3, 2021, Lumen announced its sale of its local telephone assets in 20 states to Apollo Global Management, including Ohio. Apollo formed a subsidiary called Brightspeed to acquire the assets from Lumen. The sale to Apollo closed on October 3, 2022. Following the closure of the sale, CenturyTel of Ohio was renamed Brightspeed of Northcentral Ohio, Inc.
