= Spectra Communications Group =

Spectra Communications Group, LLC
- Type: Private company (Subsidiary of CenturyLink)
- Industry: Telecommunications
- Predecessor: GTE Midwest
- Founded: 1999
- Headquarters: Atlanta, GA, US
- Products: Local telephone service
- Parent: Brightspeed
- Website: http://www.brightspeed.com/

Spectra Communications Group, LLC is a U.S. telephone operating company owned by Brightspeed that provides local telephone service in Missouri.

== History ==
Spectra Communications Group was established in 1999 upon Spectra's purchase of 170 GTE Midwest exchanges from GTE. The company was formed by Atlanta, Georgia-based Spectronics Corporation which became the first African-American owned company to control a US telecommunications company. CenturyTel had a significant investment in the telephone company, which it now owns.

=== Sale ===
On August 3, 2021, Lumen announced its sale of its local telephone assets in 20 states to Apollo Global Management, including Missouri. purchase closed on October 3, 2022.

== Service area ==
The company provides telephone service in all of the area codes in Missouri with the exception of Area code 314 and Area code 636.
