= Kyocera Strobe =

2006 mobile phone from Kyocera Wireless

- Form factor: Candybar
- Dimensions: 108 mm × 52 mm × 24 mm (4.25 in × 2.05 in × 0.94 in)
- Weight: 115 g (4.1 oz)
- Battery: Standard lithium ion (Lilon) battery (900 mAh)

The Kyocera Strobe is a cellular phone from Kyocera Wireless. It was released on June 30, 2006. Service providers such as Alltel, Bluegrass Cellular, MetroPCS, NTelos, U.S. Cellular, and Virgin Mobile carry this phone. The Strobe looks like a regular candy bar phone, but it flips into a hidden QWERTY keyboard. It has dual-color displays, keypad, built-in polyphonic ring tones, screen savers, caller alerts, a loop antenna, speaker phone, headset jack, and a VGA camera with flash and 5x zoom.

== Models ==
There are two models of the Strobe. The K612 and the K612B. The K612 has a hidden QWERTY keyboard, dual-color displays, integrated loop antenna, speaker phone, and a VGA camera with flash. The K612B is the same as the K612 except it has Bluetooth wireless technology.
