= Centel =

Defunct US telecommunications company

Centel Corporation
- Company logo
- Company type: Public
- Traded as: NYSE: CTL
- Industry: Telecommunications
- Predecessor: Central West Public Service Co, Western Power & Gas, Central Telephone and Utilities Corp.
- Founded: 1900; 126 years ago in Sioux City, Iowa
- Founder: Max McGraw
- Defunct: 1993; 33 years ago (Acquired by Sprint, divested as Embarq, acquired by CenturyLink (now Lumen Technologies)
- Headquarters: Chicago, Illinois (1977–1993); Lincoln, Nebraska (pre-1977), United States
- Area served: North Carolina, Virginia, Illinois, Florida, Texas, Ohio, Minnesota, Iowa, Nevada
- Products: Telephone, Cable television, Wireless
- Divisions: Central Telephone Company; Central Telephone Company of Virginia; Central Telephone Company of Texas

Centel Corporation was an American telecommunications company, with primary interests in basic telephone service, cellular phone service and cable television service.

== Early history ==
In 1900, Max McGraw took his savings from his newspaper route to start an electrical repair and supply shop, the McGraw Electric Company, in Sioux City, Iowa. Over the years, McGraw's company grew from residential wiring installation to include industrial wiring, electrical supply wholesaling, and electronics manufacturing. In 1922, McGraw entered the telecommunications business with the purchase of Central Telephone and Electric Company of St. Louis, Missouri. McGraw's businesses grew rapidly, and in 1926 more than 20 separate electric and telephone companies were consolidated as Central West Public Service Company.

Through a series of mergers, acquisitions, purchases, sales, and re-purchases, the electrical supply and manufacturing side of the business would form the nucleus of McGraw-Edison. Through similar processes, the telecommunications side would become Centel, which became the name of the company in 1982.‍

== Centel ==
Centel provided telephone service through its Central Telephone Company subsidiary. Its largest coverage areas by lines installed were Las Vegas, Chicago suburbs (Des Plaines, Park Ridge and unincorporated Cook County just outside the village limits of Northbrook, Glenview and Niles), Tallahassee, Florida and Charlottesville, Virginia. It was, until the breakup of AT&T in 1984, the fifth-largest telephone company in the United States after AT&T, GTE, United Telecom and Contel.

Centel also owned a stake in Keyfax, a teletext/videotex service operating in the Chicago area, alongside Honeywell and Field Enterprises. The service was discontinued by 1986.‍÷

Centel sold its cable operations in 1989. Centel sold its electric operations in 1991 to UtiliCorp United.

Centel had consolidated revenues of $1.2 billion in 1991.‍ (Note: equivalent to $2.5 billion in 2024)

Centel was purchased by Sprint in 1993 for approximately $3 billion in Sprint common stock.‍ (Note: equivalent to $5.9 billion in 2024) Centel's stock was trading at $42.50 per share (Note: equivalent to $80 in 2024) on the New York Stock Exchange just before the merger announcement in May 1992, but the cash value of the deal (commonly referred to as a “takeunder”) worked out to be only $33.50 per share (Note: equivalent to $70 in 2024) of Centel stock. After a bitter battle with dissident shareholders who believed the company was worth more, the merger was ultimately approved by a very narrow majority, with 50.5% of the outstanding shares voting for the merger.

At the time of its 1993 purchase by Sprint, Centel provided local telephone service to 1.5 million telephone lines in seven states and was also the 10th-largest U.S. cellular company with operations in 22 states. It had 9,300 employees.

Ultimately, Sprint did not end up keeping either of Centel's businesses (cellular and local telephone service) that it acquired. The cellular operations were spun off in 1996 so Sprint could instead focus on providing Sprint PCS cellular service. The local telephone operations were spun off (after being combined with Sprint's own local telephone operations) in 2006.

== Former subsidiaries ==
=== Central Telephone Company ===
In 2006, Sprint spun off the former Centel telephone subsidiaries (which Sprint had merged with its own United Telephone operations) as part of the formation of Embarq. Embarq was acquired in 2009 by CenturyTel, which was renamed CenturyLink (since renamed Lumen Technologies in 2020). Central Telephone's Florida operations were merged with Sprint's and are now CenturyLink of Florida, while the Nevada operations are now CenturyLink of Nevada. Other ex-Centel local operations were divested in 2022 to the new company Brightspeed.

Earlier, in 1997, Sprint sold the Chicago-area phone operations (Des Plaines and Park Ridge) to Ameritech (now AT&T). Operations in Iowa and Minnesota were sold to Frontier Communications in 1991, and in Ohio to CenturyTel in 1992. The Ohio operations, by this point CenturyTel of Ohio, would reunite with most of the other Centel operating companies in 2009.

=== Centel Cellular Company ===
In 1993, Centel Cellular Company changed its name to Sprint Cellular Company when Sprint acquired Centel. It was subsequently spun off as 360 Communications Company in 1996. Alltel acquired 360 Communications Company in 1998 for $4.1 billion. (Note: equivalent to $7.3 billion in 2024) Verizon Wireless acquired Alltel in 2008.

=== Centel Cable Television ===
In 1989, Centel sold all of its cable television operations in six separate transactions.

Southeast Florida operations: to Adelphia Communications, which later sold to Time Warner Cable, which later sold the properties to Comcast.

Ohio operations: to Warner Cable (then Time Warner Cable, later to Charter Communications).

Central Florida operations: to American Television and Communications Corporation (a subsidiary of Time Inc., then Time Warner Cable), later to be spun off as Bright House Networks, and ultimately acquired by Charter Communications).

Kentucky operations: to Simmons Communications (later to Frontiervision, then Adelphia, then Time Warner Cable, and ultimately Charter Communications).

Michigan operations: to C-TEC (later Michigan Cable, then Avalon Cable, then Charter Communications).

Illinois operations: to Jones Intercable (then taken over by Comcast).

The combined revenue of the sales amounted to $1.4 billion,‍ (Note: equivalent to $3.1 billion in 2024) which yielded a net gain of over $500 million to Centel.‍ (Note: equivalent to $1.1 billion in 2024)

=== Centel Electric ===
In 1991, Centel sold its electric utility holdings in Kansas and Colorado to UtiliCorp (later known as Aquila, Inc.) for $345 million.‍ (Note: equivalent to $700 million in 2024) In 2006, Aquila sold the Kansas electric properties to Mid-Kansas Electric Company (a cooperative). In 2008, the Colorado electric properties were acquired by Black Hills Corporation.
