= CenturyTel of San Marcos =

Texas telecom company

CenturyTel of San Marcos, Inc.
- Type: Private (Subsidiary of CenturyLink)
- Industry: Telecommunications
- Founded: 1992
- Products: Local Telephone Service
- Parent: Brightspeed
- Website: http://www.brightspeed.com/

CenturyTel of San Marcos, Inc. is a telephone operating company providing local telephone services in Texas owned by Brightspeed.

The company was founded as San Marcos Telephone Company in 1952. It was acquired by Century Telephone, now CenturyLink, in 1993 and absorbed into a company Century Telephone created which was named Century Telephone of San Marcos, Inc. The company's name was later changed to CenturyTel of San Marcos, Inc.

The company was among those sold in 2022 to form Brightspeed. The purchase closed on October 3, 2022.
