= Open Mobile (disambiguation) =

Open Mobile is a mobile network operator offering mobile phone services exclusively in Puerto Rico

OpenMobile is a mobile network operator offering mobile phone services exclusively in The Netherlands

Open Mobile may also refer to:

- Open Mobile Terminal Platform, a former industry forum in the wireless services area
- Open Mobile Alliance, a standards body which develops open standards for the mobile phone industry
