= United Telecommunications =

United Telecommunications was the predecessor company of two United States telecommunications companies:

- Sprint Corporation, a mobile telecommunications company based in Overland Park, Kansas
- Embarq, the former local telephone division of Sprint, now part of CenturyLink
