= CenturyTel of Adamsville =

CenturyTel of Adamsville, Inc.
- Type: Subsidiary
- Industry: Telecommunications
- Founded: 1951; 75 years ago
- Products: Local Telephone Service
- Parent: Brightspeed
- Website: www.brightspeed.com

CenturyTel of Adamsville, Inc. is a telephone operating company of Brightspeed providing local telephone services to communities in Tennessee, including Adamsville and Yellow Creek. The company was founded in 1951.

The company was named Century Telephone of Adamsville, Inc. from 1994 to 1998.

The company was among those sold in 2022 to form Brightspeed. The purchase closed on October 3, 2022.
