= Shentel Stadium =

Stadium in Winchester, Virginia

Coordinates: 39.16578°N 78.15293°W

Shentel Stadium is a 3,000-seat stadium in Winchester, Virginia where it serves as home to the football team of Shenandoah University.

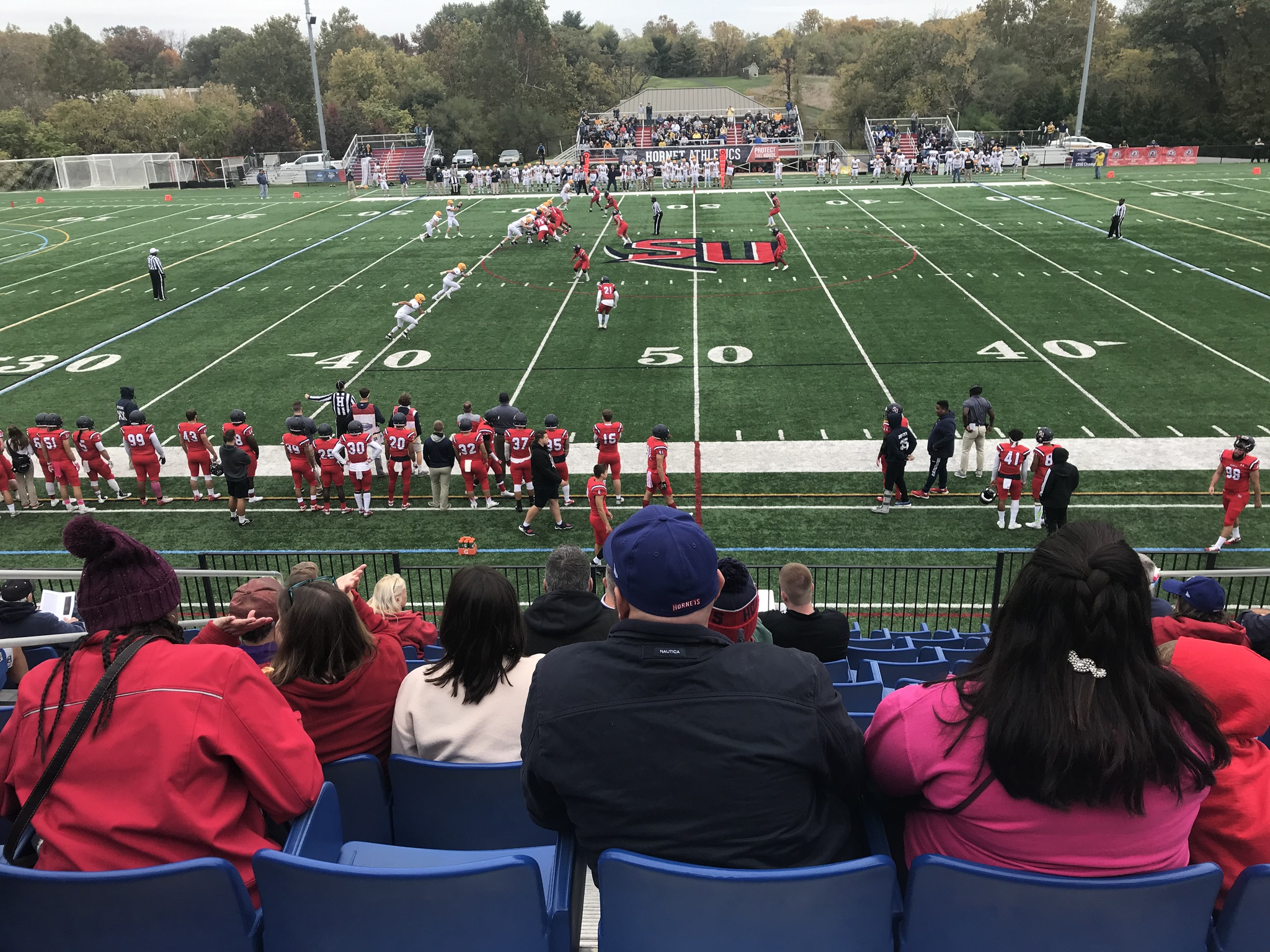
Shentel Stadium in October 2019

Built in 2001 the stadium's name comes from a sponsorship agreement with Shenandoah Telecommunications Company (or Shentel). It is home to the 2004, 2005 USA South Conference Football Champions. It is also home to the men's and women's soccer teams along with the men's and women's lacrosse teams. The stadium's field is an artificial playing surface.
