= CenturyTel of Central Indiana =

Telecommunication company

CenturyTel of Central Indiana, Inc.
- Company type: Private (Subsidiary of CenturyLink)
- Industry: Telecommunications
- Founded: 1954
- Headquarters: Indiana, United States
- Products: Local Telephone Service
- Parent: Brightspeed
- Website: http://www.brightspeed.com/

CenturyTel of Central Indiana, Inc., is a telephone operating of Brightspeed providing local telephone services to the communities of Brookston, Battle Ground, and Kempton in Indiana. The company was founded in 1954 as the Central Indiana Telephone Company Incorporated, later changing its name to Century Telephone of Central Indiana, Inc., in 1996, and then to its current name in 1998.

The company is among those sold in 2022 to form Brightspeed. The purchase closed on October 3, 2022.
