= CenturyTel of Port Aransas =

CenturyTel of Port Aransas, Inc.
- Type: Private (Subsidiary of Lumen Technologies)
- Industry: Telecommunications
- Founded: 1955
- Products: Local Telephone Service
- Parent: Brightspeed
- Website: https://www.brightspeed.com/

CenturyTel of Port Aransas, Inc. is a telephone operating company providing local telephone services in Texas owned by Brightspeed.

The company was established in 1955.

On August 3, 2021, Lumen announced its sale of its local telephone assets in 20 states to Apollo Global Management, including Texas. The purchase closed on October 3, 2022.
