= Power source =

A power source is a source of power. Most commonly the type of power referred to is:

- Power (physics), the rate of doing work; equivalent to an amount of energy consumed per unit time
  - Electric power, the rate at which electrical energy is transferred by an electric circuit; usually produced by electric generators or batteries

Power source may correspondingly refer to:

- A source of primary energy, an energy form found in nature that has not been subjected to any conversion or transformation process
- Energy carrier, or secondary energy, a substance or phenomenon that contains energy that can be later converted to other forms such as mechanical work or heat or to operate chemical or physical processes
  - Fuel, a material that stores potential energy in forms that can be practicably released and used for work
  - See Energy development for an overview of primary and secondary energy or power sources

or, often more specifically to an electric power source:

- The electric power industry
- A source of electrical energy
  - Electric power system, a network of electrical components used to supply, transmit and use electric power
    - Electricity generation, the process of generating electric power from other sources of primary energy
    - Power station, an industrial facility for the generation of electric power
    - Electric generator, a device that converts mechanical energy to electrical energy for use in an external circuit
    - Electric power transmission
    - Electric power distribution
    - Mains electricity or household power, the general-purpose alternating-current (AC) electric power supply
    - AC power plugs and sockets, devices that allow electrically operated equipment to be connected to the primary alternating current (AC) power supply in a building
  - Battery (electricity), a device consisting of one or more electrochemical cells that convert stored chemical energy into electrical energy

Some conversion devices are sometimes called a "power source":

- Engine, a machine designed to convert energy into useful mechanical motion
- Power supply, an electrical device that supplies electric energy to an electrical load, by converting one form of electrical energy to another

== As a proper name ==
PowerSource may also refer to:

- PowerSource (phone brand), mobile phone that can make use of both Sprint-Nextel cellular networks
- PowerSource (musical group), a Christian music group of the 1980s
- PowerSource, a weekly print section, and a companion website of the Pittsburgh Post-Gazette, highlighting the Pittsburgh region’s diverse energy industry

== See also ==
- MBM Motorsports, a NASCAR team that regularly goes by "Power Source"
- Power (disambiguation)
- Prime mover (disambiguation)
- Source (disambiguation)
- Current source
- Voltage source
