= CenturyTel of Arkansas =

Telephone operating company

CenturyTel of Arkansas, Inc.
- Type: Private (Subsidiary of CenturyLink)
- Industry: Telecommunications
- Predecessor: GTE Arkansas
- Founded: 1956
- Products: Local Telephone Service
- Parent: Brightspeed
- Website: http://www.brightspeed.com/

CenturyTel of Arkansas, Inc. is a telephone operating company owned by Brightspeed providing local telephone services to Arkansas, including Ash Flat, Horseshoe Bend, and Mount Pleasant. The company was founded in 1956.

The company was among those sold off in 2022 by Lumen Technologies to form Brightspeed. The purchase closed on October 3, 2022.
