= Brightspeed of Missouri =

Brightspeed of Missouri, LLC
- Company type: Private (Subsidiary of Brightspeed)
- Industry: Telecommunications
- Predecessor: GTE Midwest
- Founded: October 17, 2001; 24 years ago
- Products: Local Telephone Service
- Parent: Lumen Technologies (2001-2022); Brightspeed (2022-present)

Brightspeed of Missouri, LLC is a telephone operating company owned by Brightspeed that provides local telephone service in Missouri. The cities served by the company include Branson and Columbia.

== History ==
Brightspeed of Missouri was established as CenturyTel of Missouri, LLC on October 17, 2001 upon CenturyTel's purchase of lines from Verizon Communications. The lines in Missouri were transferred from GTE Midwest, which was originally an operating company of GTE. Included in the transfer were lines that GTE acquired in its purchase of Contel.

Following the sale, GTE Midwest was dissolved.

=== Sale ===
On August 3, 2021, Lumen announced its sale of its local telephone assets in 20 states to Apollo Global Management, including Missouri.

The company was renamed Brightspeed of Missouri, LLC following the sale.

`
