= NTelos =

Wireless telecommunications company and PCS provider

nTelos, Inc.

- nTelos Wireless Pavilion in Charlottesville, Virginia
- Industry: Telecommunications
- Founded: 1997; 29 years ago
- Fate: Merged with Shentel
- Headquarters: Waynesboro, Virginia, United States
- Key people: Rodney Dir (CEO)
- Products: Wireless & Wireline
- Website: http://www.ntelos.com/

nTelos, Inc. was a Wireless telecommunications company and PCS provider based in Waynesboro, Virginia. As of 2013, nTelos' service area covered 5.3 million people making it the 9th largest provider of mobile broadband in the United States.

On August 10, 2015, it was announced that Shenandoah Telecommunications Company, or Shentel, had agreed to purchase nTelos. The deal, expected to close in early 2016, would see the nTelos brand replaced by Sprint through Shentel's affiliation with Sprint. All of nTelos retail stores, indirect locations (authorized agents), and some other employees would be rebranded under Sprint, with those locations managed through Shentel. On May 9, 2016, the merger with Shentel was completed.

== Wireless services ==
nTelos Wireless operated a CDMA PCS network in Virginia, portions of West Virginia, Maryland, Ohio, Kentucky, and North Carolina. nTelos Wireless began acquiring PCS spectrum in western Virginia and West Virginia in 1995 and began operations in Virginia in 1997 and in West Virginia in 1998. nTelos Wireless expanded in July 2000 to include Eastern Virginia with the acquisition of these assets from PrimeCo Personal Communications, LP. In June 2004, nTelos began to offer high speed data services in select markets and in 2006 began offering 1xRTT capability across their service area. Currently nTelos offers 1XRTT and REV. An EVDO using Alcatel-Lucent technology. nTelos ended the year 2007 with 407,000 wireless subscribers. nTelos was also the fifth carrier in the nation to offer the iPhone at a reduced price compared to other carriers.

== Former services ==
The company was founded as the Clifton Forge-Waynesboro Telephone Company (CFW) in 1897. From 2000 to 2011, the services operated under the name of nTelos, with the wireline business divided into two operations: a rural local exchange carrier (RLEC) and Competitive Wireline, which includes competitive local exchange carrier (CLEC), network and internet operations. nTelos operated as a RLEC in Virginia and owns two incumbent local exchange carriers and serves three rural Virginia regions. As a CLEC, nTelos provided service in 16 areas in Virginia and on most highways, and cities in West Virginia.

The wireline business is supported by a fiber optic network that is used to back-haul communications traffic for their own retail services and to provide wholesale transport services to other telecommunications carriers for their long distance, internet, wireless and private network services. nTelos started FTTP services in certain areas of Virginia.

nTelos' wireline services were spun off into a separate company, Lumos Networks, beginning in August 2011. Lumos became fully independent of nTelos at the close of business on October 31, 2011.
