= GTE Midwest =

GTE Midwest, Inc. was a GTE operating company formed in 1993 upon the split off of some GTE local telephone operations from GTE North. GTE Midwest served Missouri, Iowa, Nebraska, and Minnesota, and included the former operations of Contel in Iowa and Missouri.

== History ==
In 1995, GTE Midwest's Minnesota operations were transferred to Contel of Minnesota, Inc. Contel of Minnesota had always been a separate company from GTE Midwest.

In 2000, GTE completed the sale of some of its Missouri lines to Spectra Communications Group, which was an investment of CenturyTel. Also occurring that year Bell Atlantic acquired GTE, renaming the merged company Verizon. Upon the completion of the merger, Iowa operations of GTE Midwest were sold to Iowa Network Service, and Nebraska operations were sold to Citizens Utilities (Citizens Telecommunications Company of Nebraska). By the end of 2000, GTE Midwest only served Missouri, and GTE Midwest began doing business as Verizon Midwest.

== Dissolution ==
In 2002, Verizon sold its operations in Missouri to CenturyTel, becoming CenturyTel of Missouri (remaining separate from Spectra Communications Group).

On August 31, 2002, Verizon discontinued Verizon Midwest as an operating company, with all of its operations transferred to different operating companies within the former GTE group, or the operations being sold off.

== Sources ==
- GTE Midwest, Inc. dba Verizon Midwest, Inc.
