= Rapid Communications =

American telecommunications company

- Company type: Private
- Industry: Telecommunications
- Founded: 2002
- Defunct: 2009
- Fate: Out of business
- Headquarters: Denver, CO United States
- Products: Cable television, broadband Internet, VoIP
- Website: www.rapidcable.com

Rapid Communications was a telecommunications company that provided digital cable television, high-speed Internet, and telephone service to rural communities in Alabama, Arizona, California, Nevada, New Mexico, Washington, Oklahoma, Kansas, Arkansas, Texas, Indiana, Illinois, Ohio, North Carolina, Kentucky, Pennsylvania, Louisiana and Oregon. It was founded in 2002 by Thomas G. Semptimphelter. It served approximately 84,000 customers.

On May 22, 2008, Hilliary Communications acquired systems from Rapid Communications in Elgin, Fletcher, Cyril and Rush Springs, Oklahoma.

On December 1, 2008, Shenandoah Telecommunications (Shentel) acquired systems from Rapid Communications in Virginia and West Virginia.

Rapid sold its California and Nevada assets to CalNeva Broadband, LLC of Clovis, California. They own systems in Frazier Park, Chester, Needles, and Winnemucca.

Its remaining assets were sold to Reach Broadband, LLC and others were sold to Almega Cable, who filed for Chapter 7 bankruptcy in April and all its systems are now shut down.

Many of its former East Texas communities are now served by Alliance Communications Network, an Arkansas-based cable company. Rapid's Greenford Ohio community is now served by Armstrong Cable Services, a Butler Pennsylvania-based company

It is unknown to whom its other cable systems were sold to.
