= Open Mobile =

Defunct telecommunication company in Puerto Rico

- Open Mobile logo
- Type: Private
- Industry: Mobile operator
- Predecessor: NewComm Wireless Services (d/b/a Movistar)
- Founded: June 12, 2007; 19 years ago (relaunch of Movistar)
- Defunct: May 30, 2018; 8 years ago
- Headquarters: Guaynabo, Puerto Rico
- Area served: Puerto Rico
- Key people: Juan Saca (president & CEO of Open Mobile)
- Parent: Boost Mobile (2018)
- Website: www.openmobilepr.com

Open Mobile was a mobile network operator that offered mobile phone services exclusively in Puerto Rico. The company was established on June 12, 2007, as a relaunch of NewComm Wireless Services (formerly d/b/a Movistar). Its new owners, M/C Partners and Columbia Capital, acquired Movistar's assets for $160 million USD after Movistar filed for Chapter 11 bankruptcy protection in December 2006.

Open Mobile's business model was based on the advance payment and unlimited local call services. The company was able to achieve positive EBITDA after 5 months of its relaunch. Since 2015, the company began to offer safelink mobile re-certification procedures.

In 2014, Verizon Wireless signed a 2G and 3G roaming agreement with Open Mobile to allow Verizon customers to use Open Mobile's network without charge. This agreement came when Claro shut down the former Verizon CDMA network in Puerto Rico in favor of GSM, UMTS, and LTE.

On February 23, 2017, Sprint and Open Mobile announced an agreement to combine their businesses in Puerto Rico and the U.S. Virgin Islands into a new joint venture. Both companies will continue to operate separately until the transaction closes. The transaction close was subject to review and approval by the Federal Communications Commission, along with other regulatory authorities. The merger was approved in September 2017, with Sprint becoming the majority shareholder.

In the summer of 2018, all of the Open Mobile stores were changed to Boost Mobile stores.

As part of Sprint's merger with T-Mobile, Open Mobile customers would be transferred to Boost Mobile, later Liberty.
