= Shentel =

Telecommunication company

Shenandoah Telecommunications Company
- Trade name: Shentel
- Type: Public
- Traded as: Nasdaq: SHEN; S&P 600 component Russell 2000 component
- Industry: Telecommunications
- Founded: 1902; 124 years ago
- Headquarters: Edinburg, Virginia, U.S.
- Services: Local and long-distance telephone service, cable television, Internet access, wireless Internet access, digital phone, fiber-optic Internet, wholesale
- Revenue: ▲$612 million (2017)
- Operating income: ▲$46.5 million (2017)
- Net income: ▼$-6.995 million (2016)
- Number of employees: 1200
- Website: shentel.com

Shenandoah Telecommunications Company, doing business as Shentel, is a publicly traded telecommunications company headquartered in Edinburg, Virginia. It operates a digital wireless and wireline network in rural Virginia, West Virginia, Maryland, and Pennsylvania.

== History ==
Shentel was founded in January 1902 as the Farmers' Mutual Telephone System of Shenandoah County (FMTS). This was one of a number of Farmers' Mutual telephone systems established in rural areas of the United States. The company's initial goal was to bring telephone service to rural residents of Shenandoah County, VA. In 1960, the name changed to Shenandoah Telephone Company, then in 1981 to Shenandoah Telecommunications Company (Shentel). The company launched cable TV service and a fiber optic network in the 1980s. In 1984, Shentel added mobile and paging services. In 1990, Shentel launched Shenandoah Cellular, the first company in Virginia to offer cellular service to a rural area. Internet service was made available to Shentel customers in 1994.

In the 2000s, Shentel began to expand its cable footprint - purchasing cable assets from Rapid Communications in Virginia and West Virginia in 2008, and acquiring JetBroadband in southern Virginia and southern West Virginia in 2010. Later in 2010, Shentel purchased two small cable systems from Suddenlink Communications (one in West Virginia, the other in Maryland).

In May 2016, Shentel finished acquiring its competitor Ntelos for 640 million dollars. acquiring 297,500 subscribers. The deal also transferred an additional 291,000 subscribers from Sprint in exchange for Ntelos spectrum, making Shentel the sixth largest public wireless company in the United States.

In February 2019, Shentel announced the agreement to purchase Big Shandy Broadband, a Kentucky-based cable television, broadband Internet and phone provider.

On August 27, 2020, T-Mobile USA decided to purchase the wireless assets of the company.

In October 2023, Shentel announced their acquisition of The Chillicothe Telephone Company (dba Horizon Telcom) and its assets; thus expanding their "Glo Fiber" branded fiber network into the South-Eastern Ohio area.

In March 2024, Shentel agreed to the sale of its cell tower portfolio to Vertical Bridge, reportedly the largest private owner of communications towers in the US, for $310.3 million in cash.
