= PowerSource (phone brand) =

Dual-network cellular phones

PowerSource, or "hybrid" phones, are specialized cellular devices used by customers of the American telecommunications company Sprint Nextel. They are distinct from other mobile phones in that they make use of two cellular networks instead of a single one, integrating the legacy Nextel network with the higher-capacity, higher-speed Sprint network.

PowerSource phones included the ic402, ic502, ic602 and ic902, all manufactured by Motorola and available only through Sprint Nextel in the United States.

== History ==
Upon the merger of Sprint PCS and Nextel Communications in 2005, the combined company faced significant integration challenges. Unlike some other mergers in the wireless arena, Sprint PCS and Nextel employed different air-interface technologies for their networks, making them incompatible. Sprint used Qualcomm's proprietary CDMA format, which they operated in the 1900 MHz band, while Nextel used Motorola's iDEN system, which they deployed at 800 MHz. This meant that the combined company had two distinct customer bases with two types of phones; a Nextel user could not use their phone on the Sprint PCS network, and vice versa.

There was an additional problem facing the newly combined company: prior to the merger, Nextel Communications had been issued a government mandate to reduce interference caused by its cellular network with public safety radio systems. It was to do so via a process termed "re-banding." As a side effect of this "re-banding", however, Nextel's iDEN network would lose valuable 800 MHz spectrum, causing the network to face significant capacity challenges. Simultaneously, Boost Mobile, a prepaid MVNO that operated on Nextel's network, was beginning to skyrocket in popularity, placing an even greater burden on the iDEN system. This eventually manifested itself in a decrease in Nextel customers' call quality in certain markets—dropped calls, blocked calls, and bad voice quality all began to be reported in various cities in 2006. High-margin iDEN customers were leaving in droves for other carriers, affecting the company's bottom line.

To remedy this problem, Sprint Nextel sought to move as much of its customers' voice traffic (phone call volume) as it could from the Nextel network to the higher-capacity Sprint network. The challenge that arose then, however, was how to keep the Nextel customer base happy; Nextel had become famous in the United States for its walkie-talkie feature (called Direct Connect), a feature that at the time could not be replicated on the Sprint (or any other) network. The result was the PowerSource series of phones. Originally called "hybrids", these devices were aggressively marketed to Nextel customers in so-called "red markets" (areas of high Nextel network congestion) beginning in the fourth quarter of 2006. The company counted 850,000 PowerSource phone customers by the end of the second quarter of 2007. However, the company continued to bleed iDEN customers, only about a third of whom migrated to other networks.

When the iDEN network was shut down in June 2013, PowerSource phones continued to operate on the Sprint CDMA network only. This network was turned off in March 2022.

PowerSource phones used the Sprint network for interconnect (regular voice phone calls) and the Nextel network for walkie-talkie calls. They did this through the implementation of two radios in each unit—a 1900 MHz CDMA radio for Sprint and an 800 MHz iDEN radio for Nextel. Since the more capacity-hungry interconnect (phone) calls as well as data were routed through the higher-capacity and faster Sprint network, these phones in mass deployment were expected to reduce the overall burden on the Nextel network. Also, since interconnect and walkie-talkie calls use different networks, it is possible to receive a walkie-talkie alert while on a regular voice call—something not possible on a traditional Nextel phone.

Maintaining two active radios in a single handset is a power-intensive task, and some users have complained about lack of battery endurance in the ic402/ic502 models. Some users report Sprint Nextel acknowledges the problem and has even offered free car chargers as a result. Additionally, because Motorola did not include the capability for 800 MHz roaming in the handset, the usable coverage area for a PowerSource phone was significantly less than that of a comparable Sprint PCS phone. Also, since the PowerSource series does not allow voice calling over the iDEN network, a customer with good Nextel coverage but no Sprint coverage would only be able to use the walkie-talkie feature.

Phone selection was once a stumbling point, with the ic402 and ic502 (marketed as the Blend and Buzz) being the only two models available at launch; both were basic units that lacked cameras or high-speed data and had low-resolution displays. Later in 2007, the high-end ic902—equipped with high-speed 3G data (EVDO), a 2-megapixel camera and external SD card storage—and the mid-tier ic602 were released.
