= Sprint Corporation =

Former American telecommunications company

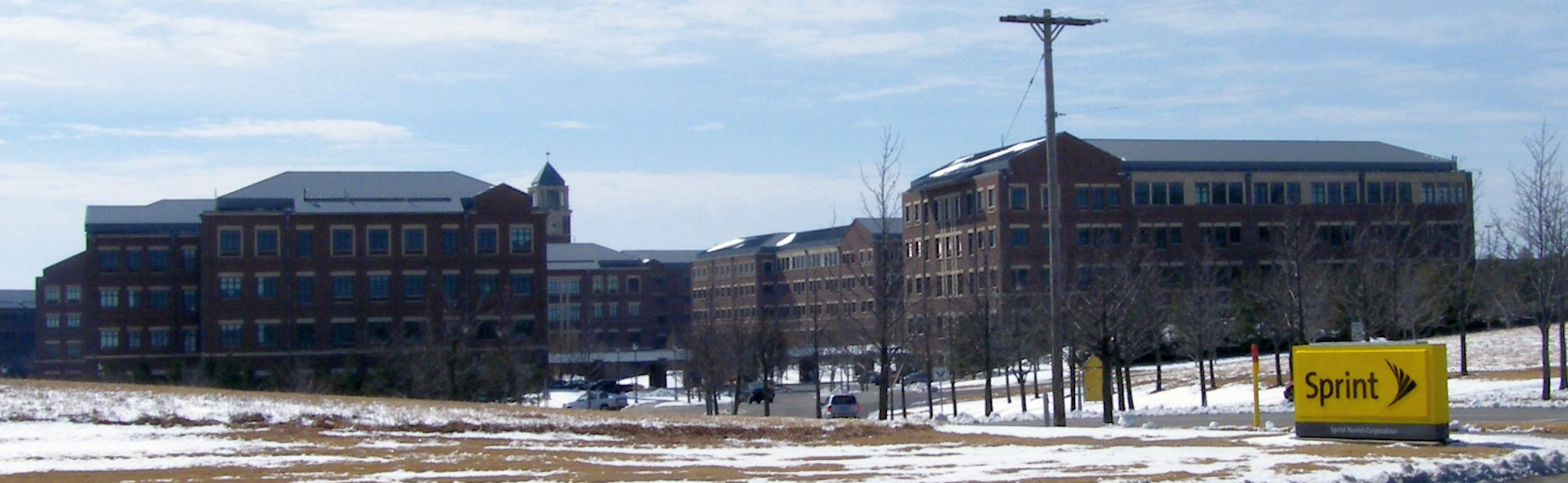
- Former Sprint World Headquarters Campus in Overland Park, Kansas, U.S.
- Formerly: Brown Telephone Company (1899–1911); United Telephone Company (1911–1925); United Telephone and Electric (1925–1938); United Utilities, Inc. (1938–1972); United Telecommunications and United Telephone System (1972–1987); Sprint Corporation (1987–2005, 2013–2020); Sprint Nextel Corporation (2005–2013)
- Type: Public
- Traded as: NYSE: S
- Industry: Telecommunications
- Predecessors: Southern Pacific Communications Company; Nextel Communications
- Founded: December 21, 1899; 126 years ago
- Founder: Cleyson Brown
- Defunct: April 1, 2020; 6 years ago (as an independent company); August 2, 2020; 6 years ago (official)
- Fate: Merged into T-Mobile US
- Successors: Embarq (connectivity business); T-Mobile US (wireless operations)
- Headquarters: Overland Park, Kansas, U.S.
- Area served: United States
- Services: Mobile Telephony; Wireless communications; Internet services; Broadband
- Revenue: ▲US$33.60 billion (2019)
- Operating income: ▼US$398 million (2019)
- Net income: ▼US$1.94 billion (2019)
- Total assets: ▼US$84.60 billion (2019)
- Total equity: ▼US$26.07 billion (2019)
- Number of employees: ▼28,500 (Q1 2019)
- Parent: GTE (1983–1990); T-Mobile US (2020)
- Subsidiaries: Boost Mobile; Open Mobile; Virgin Mobile USA
- ASN: 1239

Sprint Corporation was an American telecommunications company. Before being acquired by T-Mobile US on April 1, 2020, it was the fourth-largest mobile network operator in the United States, serving 54.3 million customers as of June 30, 2019. The company also offered wireless voice, messaging, and broadband services through its various subsidiaries under the Boost Mobile and Open Mobile brands and wholesale access to its wireless networks to mobile virtual network operators.

In July 2013, majority ownership of the company was purchased by the Japanese telecommunications company SoftBank Group. Sprint used CDMA, EvDO and 4G LTE networks, and formerly operated iDEN, WiMAX, and 5G NR networks. Sprint was incorporated in Kansas.

Sprint traced its origins to the Brown Telephone Company, which was founded in 1899 to bring telephone service to the rural area around Abilene, Kansas. In 2006, Sprint left the local landline telephone business and spun those assets off into a new company named Embarq, which later became a part of Lumen Technologies under the CenturyLink brand, which remains one of the largest long-distance providers in the United States.

Until 2005, the company was also known as the Sprint Corporation, but took the name Sprint Nextel Corporation when it merged with Nextel Communications and adopted its black and yellow color scheme, along with a new logo. In 2013, following the shutdown of the Nextel network and concurrent with the acquisition by SoftBank, the company resumed using the name Sprint Corporation. In July 2013, as part of the SoftBank transactions, Sprint acquired the remaining shares of the wireless broadband carrier Clearwire Corporation that it did not already own.

In August 2014, CEO Dan Hesse was replaced by Marcelo Claure. In May 2018, Michel Combes replaced Claure, and had been working to get Sprint's acquisition by its rival T-Mobile through regulatory proceedings.

On April 1, 2020, Sprint Corporation completed their acquisition by T-Mobile US, which effectively made Sprint a subsidiary of T-Mobile until the Sprint brand officially discontinued in the beginning of August. Leadership, background, and stock changes happened immediately, with customer-side changes happening over time. The Sprint brand officially discontinued on August 2, 2020. Billing was already showing the T-Mobile brand, and on this date all retail, customer service, and all other company branding switched to the T-Mobile brand. New rate plans were also introduced as well for all new and existing customers from both companies, though all will be grandfathered into their current plan for at least 3 years should they choose not to switch to a new T-Mobile plan. Customers with Sprint accounts were fully migrated to T-Mobile in the summer of 2023, officially discontinuing the Sprint brand.

== History ==
=== Early years ===
The Sprint Corporation traces its origins to two companies, the Brown Telephone Company and Southern Pacific Railroad.

==== Brown Telephone Company ====
Brown Telephone Company was founded in 1899 by Cleyson Brown, to deploy the first telephone service to the rural area around Abilene, Kansas. In 1911, C. L. Brown consolidated the Brown Telephone Company with three other independents to form the United Telephone Company. C. L. Brown formed United Telephone and Electric (UT&E) in 1925. In 1939, at the end of the Great Depression, UT&E reorganized to form United Utilities.

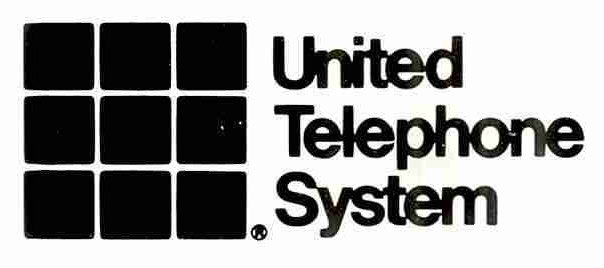
United Telephone System logo, used from 1981 into the 1990s

In 1964, Paul H. Henson became president of United Utilities; two years later, he was named chairman. When Henson began working at the company in 1959, it had 575,000 telephones in 15 states and revenues of $65 million. Henson is credited with creating the first major fiber optic network, having recognized it as a way to handle more calls and provide better quality sound.

In 1972, United Utilities changed its name to United Telecommunications. In 1980, United Telecommunications began working on a 23,000 mile fiber optic network for long-distance calls. In 1989, this long-distance business became profitable for the company for the first time. In 1990, Henson retired from United Telecommunications; by this time the company's revenues had grown to $8 billion.

==== Southern Pacific Communications and introduction of Sprint ====
Sprint also traces its roots back to the Southern Pacific Railroad (SPR), which was founded in the 1860s as a subsidiary of the Southern Pacific Company (SPC). The company operated thousands of miles of track as well as telegraph wire that ran along those tracks. In the early 1970s, the company began looking for ways to use its existing communications lines for long-distance calling. This division of the business was named the Southern Pacific Communications Company. By the mid 1970s, SPC was beginning to take business away from AT&T, which held a monopoly at the time. A number of lawsuits between SPC and AT&T took place throughout the 1970s; the majority were decided in favor of increased competition. Prior attempts at offering long-distance voice services had not been approved by the U.S. Federal Communications Commission (FCC), although a fax service (called SpeedFAX) was permitted.

In the mid-1970s, SPC held a contest to select a new name for the company. The winning entry was "SPRINT", an acronym for "Southern Pacific Railroad Internal Networking Telecommunications".

John Albertson was named by company leaders as the founding father of Sprint in a 1974 Southern Pacific historical bulletin. The company's early history and how it was named has various stories attached, but official internal company documents attribute the initial groundwork and corporate communications that allowed the telecom company to progress to Albertson, who at that time was the general superintendent of the communications system for the Southern Pacific railroad.

=== Consolidation and renaming to Sprint Corporation ===
Sprint Corporation brand mark (1987–2005)

In 1982, GTE Corp. reached an agreement to buy SPC's long-distance telephone operation, including Sprint. The deal was later finalized in 1983.

In 1986, GTE Sprint merged with the United Telecommunications Inc. property, US Telecom. The joint venture was to be co-owned by GTE and United Telecom named US Sprint Communications. The new entity also included communications firm GTE Telenet, and United Telecom Data communications Co., (formerly known as Uninet). In 1988, GTE sold more of Sprint to United Telecom, giving United Telecom operational control of the company. United Telecom announced it would complete its acquisition of US Sprint on April 18, 1990. United Telecom later officially changed its name to Sprint Corporation to capitalize on its brand recognition.

=== Expansion to Canada ===
Sprint Corporation entered the Canadian market in the early 1990s as a reseller of bulk long-distance telephone lines that it bought from domestic companies. Under Canadian foreign ownership regulations, Sprint could not open its own network. In 1993, Sprint entered into a strategic alliance with Call-Net Enterprises, a Canadian long-distance service provider, and bought 25 percent of the company. Call-Net's long-distance service was renamed "Sprint Canada" and expanded to include landline and internet services. In 2005, Call-Net and Sprint Canada's 600,000 customers were acquired by Rogers Communications.

=== Return to wireless ===
In March 1993, Sprint merged with Chicago's Centel Corp. Centel remained in the Chicago area and was renamed Sprint Cellular Co. In 1994, Sprint spun off their existing cellular operations as 360° Communications to comply with an FCC regulatory mandate. In 1998, 360 Communications was acquired by Alltel, which was in turn acquired by Verizon in 2009.

In 1994, Sprint announced plans for a powerful new venture with three of the nation's major cable television companies, Tele-Communications Inc. (TCI), Comcast Corp. and Cox Cable. The four companies outlined plans to build a nationwide network to provide wireless personal communications service (PCS), and also affirm their support for a single integrated offering of wireless, local telephone and long distance services in a package with cable television service

In 1995, Sprint and its cable television associates entered into a partnership with American Personal Communications (APC) to create a digital wireless network. In November 1995, the company began to offer wireless service under the Sprint Spectrum brand in the Baltimore-Washington metropolitan area. This was the first commercial Personal Communications Service (PCS) network in the United States. Although the Sprint PCS service was CDMA, the original Washington-area network used GSM. Eventually, Sprint launched its new nationwide CDMA network, then in 1999 sold the decommissioned GSM infrastructure to Omnipoint which re-launched in May 2000. Omnipoint was later acquired by VoiceStream Wireless, which like Sprint would eventually be acquired by T-Mobile.

=== Partnerships and more consolidation ===
In September 1996, Sprint announced a deal with RadioShack, and in 1997, Sprint stores opened at RadioShack to offer communications services and products across the United States.

On October 5, 1999, Sprint and MCI WorldCom announced a $129 billion merger agreement between the two companies. The deal would have been the largest corporate merger in history at the time. However, due to pressure from the United States Department of Justice and the European Union on concerns of it creating a monopoly, the deal did not go through.

In 1999, Sprint began recombining its local telecom, long-distance, wireline, and wireless business units into a new company, in an initiative known internally as "One Sprint". In April 2004, the separately traded wireless tracking stock PCS was absorbed into the New York Stock Exchange FON ticker symbol, Sprint's former ticker symbol (FON stood for "Fiber Optic Network", but was also a homophone of the word "phone"). This was challenged in many lawsuits by Sprint PCS shareholders who felt their stock was devalued because it was trading at the ratio of 1 share of PCS stock for 1/2 share of FON stock. The PCS shareholders claimed a loss of 1.3 billion to 3.4 billion dollars.

=== Merger of Sprint Corporation and Nextel Communications ===
On December 15, 2004, Sprint Corporation and Nextel Communications announced they would merge to form Sprint Nextel Corporation. The merger was transacted as a purchase of Nextel Communications by Sprint Corporation for tax reasons; Sprint purchased 50.1 percent of Nextel. At the time of the merger announcement, Sprint and Nextel were the third and fifth leading providers in the U.S. mobile phone industry, respectively.

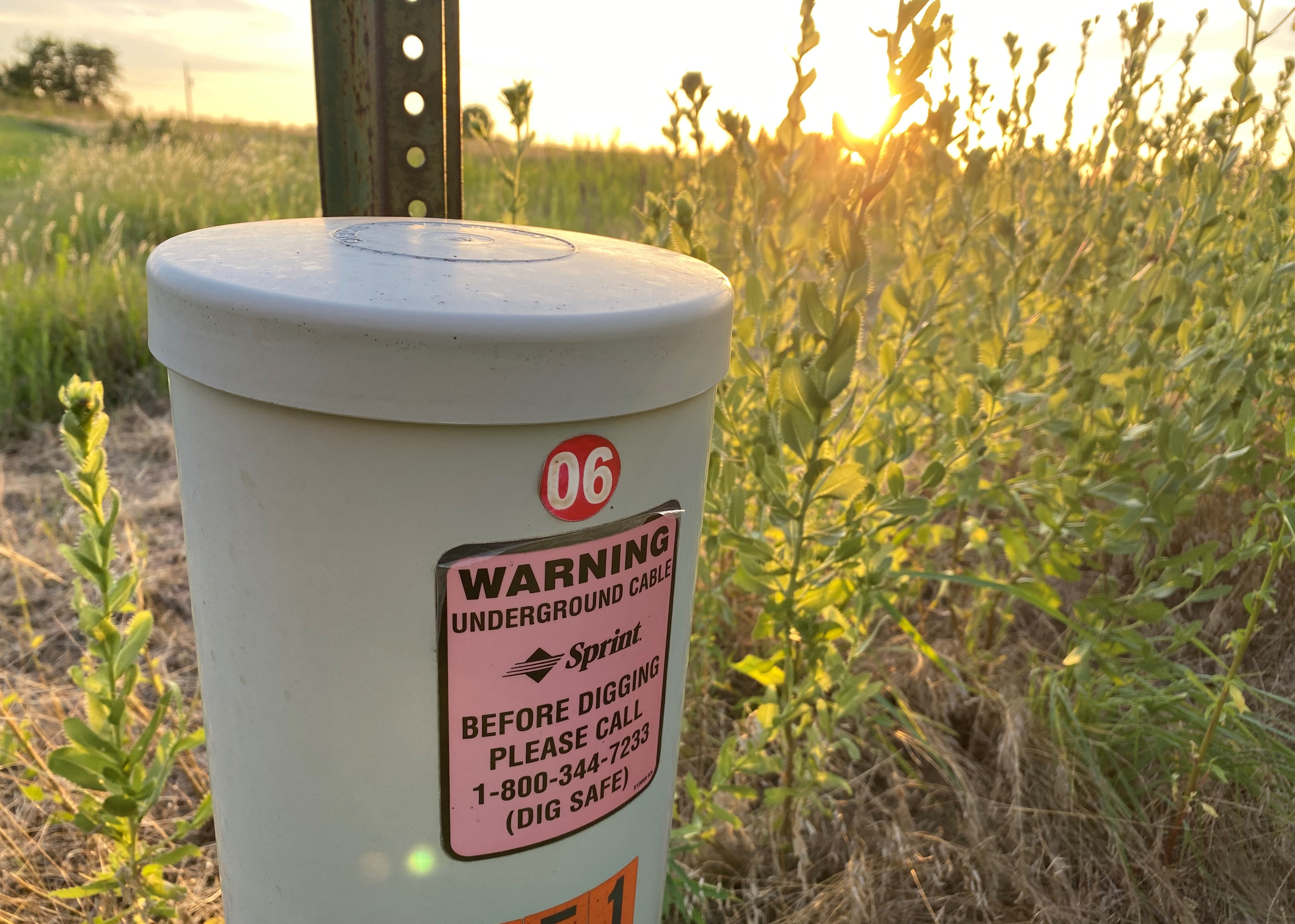
Former Sprint local telephone outdoor junction box in rural Kansas near Sterling (now owned by Brightspeed of Kansas)

Sprint shareholders approved the merger on July 13, 2005. The merger deal was approved by the U.S. Federal Communications Commission (FCC) and U.S. Department of Justice on August 3, 2005. Sprint Nextel was formed on August 13, 2005, when the deal was completed.

Sprint and Nextel faced opposition to the merger, mostly from regional affiliates that provided wireless services on behalf of the companies. These regional affiliates felt that the new company would hinder competition.

On September 1, 2005, Sprint Nextel combined plan offerings of its Sprint and Nextel brands to bring uniformity across the company's offerings.

Nextel has licensed its identity to NII Holdings, Inc., of which Sprint Nextel owned 18%. NII has used the Nextel brand to set up networks in many Latin American countries. Following Sprint's purchase of Nextel, Nextel sold all of its investment in NII Holdings.

The integration process was difficult due to disparate network technologies. Sprint tried to address this with the advent of PowerSource phones. These phones routed voice call and data services over Sprint's PCS spectrum while maintaining DirectConnect services over 800 MHz spectrum. However, this was not sufficient in coverage, due to the inability to roam on a non-PCS spectrum. Top Nextel Executives began leaving the company immediately after the merger closed. Tim Donahue, the Nextel CEO, stayed on as executive chairman, but ceded decision-making authority to Gary D. Forsee. Tom Kelly, COO of Nextel, took an interim staff position as Chief Strategy Officer. Two years after the merger, only a few key Nextel executives remained, with many former Nextel middle- and upper-level managers having left, citing reasons including the unbridgeable cultural difference between the two companies.

In 2006, Sprint spun off its local telephone operations, including the former United Telephone companies and Centel, as Embarq.

Sprint's acquisition of Nextel was a disaster from a fiscal standpoint in 2008, the company wrote down $29.7 billion of the $36 billion sum it had paid for Nextel in 2005, wiping out 80 percent of the value of Nextel at the time it had been acquired. The write down reflected the depreciation in Nextel's goodwill since the date of acquisition.

==== Affiliate acquisitions and settlements ====
Prior to their merger, Sprint and Nextel were dependent on a network of affiliated companies. Following the announcement of the merger agreement, some of these affiliates came forward with strong opposition to the Sprint-Nextel merger on the grounds that the merged company might violate existing agreements or significantly undercut earnings to these affiliates. In order for Sprint Nextel to allay some of this opposition, they initiated discussions of either acquiring some of these affiliates or renegotiating existing agreements. In several cases, the newly formed company was forced to acquire affiliated companies in exchange for their dropping their opposition to the merger. Forsee said that the company would likely have to acquire all of its remaining affiliates.

In 2005, Sprint Nextel acquired three of its ten wireless affiliates: US Unwired, acquired in August; Gulf Coast Wireless, acquired in October; and IWO Holdings, acquired in October. Alamosa PCS, which Sprint Nextel acquired on February 2, 2006, was the largest of its affiliate carriers. Other acquired affiliates include Ubiquitel, iPCS, Enterprise, and Northern. In 2021, after merging with Sprint in 2020, T-Mobile acquired the remaining two of Sprint's original ten affiliates, Shentel and Swiftel.

Below are companies which Sprint Corporation has acquired:

- August 13, 2005: Sprint acquires the Sprint PCS affiliate US Unwired for $1.3B, thus adding 500,000 additional direct customers to Sprint Nextel.
- August 30, 2005: Sprint Nextel announces its intention to acquire IWO Holdings, Inc., a mainly New England–based network affiliate for the Sprint PCS business. The acquisition closed on October 20, 2005.
- Sprint Nextel acquires Gulf Coast Wireless, adding 95,000 customers, mainly in Louisiana and Mississippi, to Sprint Nextel's CDMA network. The acquisition closed on October 3, 2005.
- November 21, 2005: Sprint Nextel announces a $4.3-billion acquisition agreement for Texas-based Sprint PCS affiliate Alamosa Holdings, potentially adding 1.48 million customers to Sprint Nextel.
- December 16, 2005: Sprint Nextel announces a $98 million agreement to acquire Enterprise Communications of Columbus, Georgia, thus adding over 52,000 customers to the company's PCS Wireless division.
- December 16, 2005: Sprint Nextel announces acquisition of non-affiliate Velocita Wireless. The transaction enhances the iDEN network's 900 MHz spectrum position. On July 2, 2007, Velocita Wireless, which became an indirect subsidiary of Sprint Nextel, was acquired by United Wireless Holdings, Inc.
- December 21, 2005: Sprint Nextel Corporation and Nextel Partners, Inc. reach an agreement for a $6.5 billion deal whereby the Sprint Nextel Corporation acquires the largest of Nextel's affiliates to end Nextel Partners' opposition to any changes by Sprint in relation to the Sprint-Nextel merger. Once completed, the Nextel Partners deal adds more than 2 million customers directly to the Sprint Nextel company.
- April 20, 2006: Sprint Nextel Corporation and Ubiquitel PCS Corporation reach an agreement whereby the Sprint Nextel Corporation acquires Ubiquitelpcs, an exclusive Sprint PCS provider.
- March 17, 2007: Sprint Nextel Corporation completes integration of Nextel Partners customers into the Sprint Nextel system. Nextel Partners' Las Vegas headquarters shuts down service, and all Nextel Partners customers are now handled through the new "Ensemble" billing system. All Nextel Partners customers are now Sprint Nextel customers and are entitled to the same promotions as all other Sprint Nextel iDEN customers.
- August 2, 2007: Sprint Nextel Corporation completes the acquisition of Northern PCS for $312.5 million including debt.
- July 28, 2009: Sprint Nextel announces a $483 million acquisition agreement for Virgin Mobile USA, adding 5 million pre-paid customers to Sprint Nextel, although these subscribers were counted in Sprint's total subscriber count, as Virgin Mobile USA was an MVNO on Sprint's CDMA network.
- October 19, 2009: Sprint Nextel agrees to acquire iPCS, one of its last remaining affiliates.

=== Consolidation to Overland Park ===
After the Sprint-Nextel merger, the company maintained an executive headquarters in Reston, Virginia and operational headquarters in Overland Park, Kansas. Sprint CEO Dan Hesse recognized that having two headquarters was not helping the merger effort, sent the wrong message to employees and contributed to the post-merger cultural clash. To resolve the problem, Hesse decided to consolidate all headquarters operations in the Sprint World Headquarters Campus located in Overland Park, Kansas, a suburb in the Kansas City metropolitan area.

=== Acquisition by SoftBank Corporation ===
On October 14, 2012, the Japanese telecommunications company SoftBank announced it intended to purchase 70% of Sprint Nextel Corporation for $20.1 billion. SoftBank stated that Sprint will remain a separate entity, and will remain a CDMA carrier until it is an all-LTE carrier. On April 15, 2013, Dish Network announced a higher bid for Sprint Nextel than the offer placed by SoftBank, with a $25.5 billion offer. On June 18, 2013, Dish retracted its bid and decided that it would instead focus on its intent to purchase Clearwire, however on June 26, 2013, Dish also retracted its bid for Clearwire, leaving the road clear for SoftBank to acquire the company. The United States Federal Communications Commission approved SoftBank's acquisition of a stake in Sprint. The FCC's acting chairwoman Mignon Clyburn and commissioner Ajit Pai both gave statements vociferously supporting the acquisition, saying the deal "serve[s] the public interest". The acquisition was completed on July 10, 2013.

On August 6, 2013, SoftBank purchased approximately 2% more shares of Sprint Corporation, increasing its ownership stake in the company to 80%.

==== Additional acquisitions ====
On November 7, 2012, Sprint Nextel announced the acquisition of 20 MHz of spectrum and 585,000 customers from U.S. Cellular in Chicago, St. Louis, central Illinois and three other Midwest markets. The deal was expected to close in mid-2013.

Prior to July 9, 2013, Sprint Nextel only owned a 50.8% equity interest in Clearwire Corporation; On December 17, 2012, Sprint Nextel agreed to pay US$2.97 per share, US$2.2 billion in total, to purchase the portion of Clearwire shares that Sprint Nextel did not already own. On June 20, 2013, Sprint Nextel increased its offer to $5 per share, the transaction was approved by regulators on July 5, 2013, and closed on July 9, 2013, and Sprint Nextel became the complete owner of Clearwire and its assets.

On March 31, 2015, the U.S. bankruptcy court approved a $160 million takeover of electronics store chain RadioShack by Standard General. As part of the deal, the company entered into a partnership with Sprint to serve as co-tenants in 1,435 of its locations, beginning on April 10, 2015. Roughly a third of the retail space in each location is dedicated to Sprint products and services, and the stores will ultimately adopt Sprint as their primary brand in place of RadioShack. Sprint stated that this deal would increase the company's retail footprint by more than double.

On January 23, 2017, Sprint announced that they were buying a 33 percent stake in the music streaming service Tidal.

Final Sprint logo used after its merger with T-Mobile until its overall retirement on August 2, 2020

== Wireline operations ==
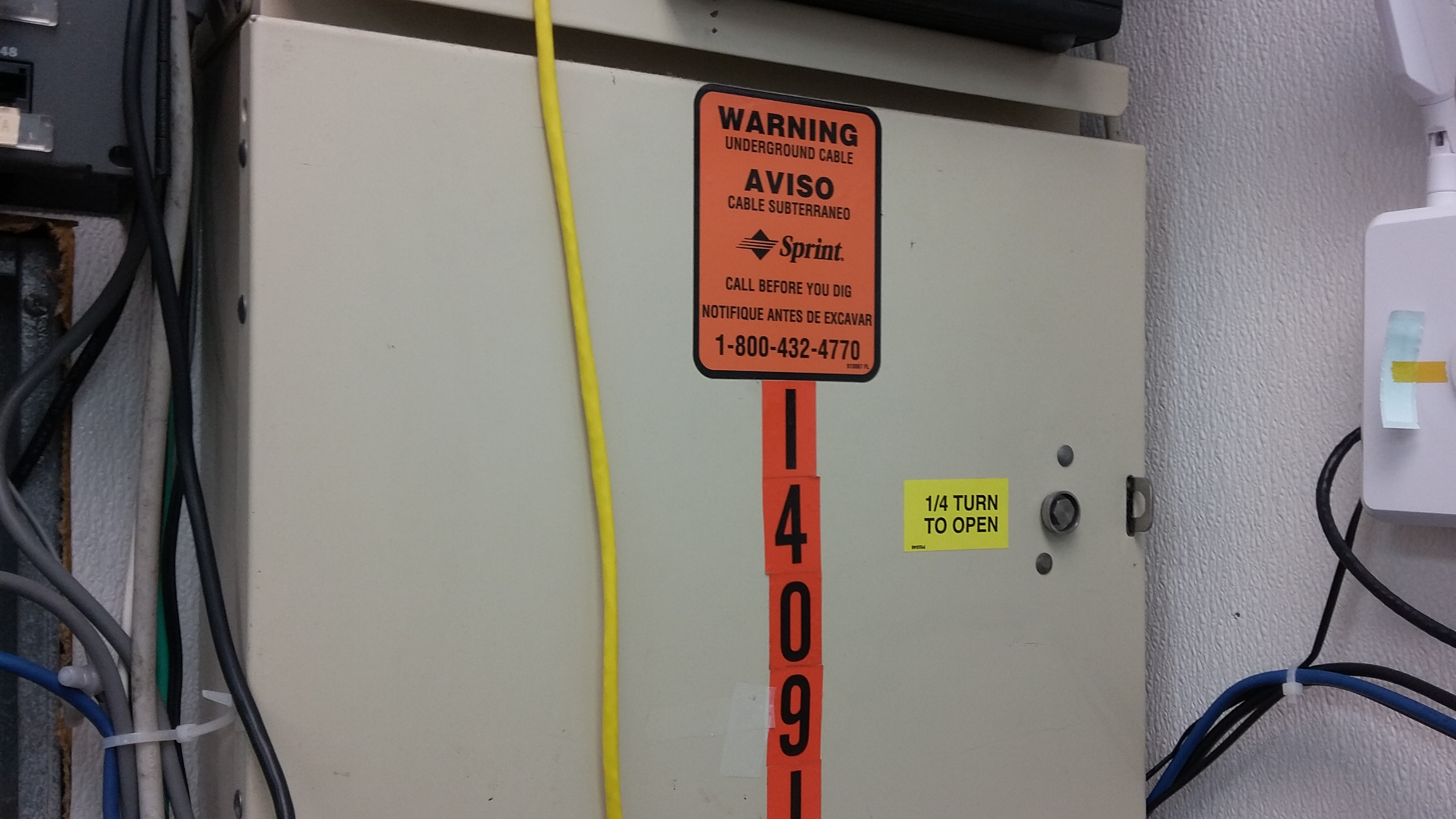
An old Sprint network interface device inside of a Port Charlotte, Florida business, which is now used by CenturyLink

Sprint derives revenue as a wireline IP network operator and as a long-distance telephony provider. Sprint is the United States' fourth largest long-distance provider by subscribers.

In 2006, Sprint Nextel exited the local landline telephone business, spinning those assets off into a newly created company named Embarq, which CenturyTel acquired in 2008 to form CenturyLink.

=== SprintLink ===
SprintLink is a global Tier 1 Internet service provider network, operating an 100G Internet backbone. Customers include large multinational corporations, government agencies, retail and restaurant chains, Tier 2 and Tier 3 ISPs, and medium-to-small businesses. SprintLink has physical presence in 155 countries, including the United States, Western Europe, East Asia, Australia, and India. The network wraps all the way around the world with buried fiber optics in the United States and Europe, and undersea fiber in the Pacific, Atlantic, and Indian Oceans. SprintLink is responsible for cable maintenance and administration in the TAT-14 Consortium. In 2008, Sprint was upgrading its SprintLink core to 100 Gbit/s lines to offer increased bandwidth. As of June 2012, Sprint picked Ciena for upgrading its Sprintlink core to 400 Gbit/s speeds.

=== Ethernet services ===
In 2007, Sprint launched Ethernet services over its IP/MPLS network to an initial 40-markets. Sprint later expanded their Ethernet services to 65 markets in September 2011. Sprint then launched Ethernet over copper and Ethernet over DOCSIS in 2016 to complement its Fiber Ethernet offerings.

=== Sprint Web Services ===
Sprint offers its enterprise customers managed web-based services through its Sprint Web Services program. It allows enterprise customers to create managed web-based applications

=== IoT & Connected Services ===
In 2015, Sprint powered the Connected Officer program for the Los Angeles Police Department in partnership with Samsung, VMware, and Prodapt.

=== Telecommunications Relay Services ===
Sprint wireline is also responsible for traditional telecommunications relay service (TRS), speech to speech relay service (STS), and captioned telephone service (CTS). Sprint is in the process of upgrading these services from a TDM network to an IP-based network

== Wireless operations ==
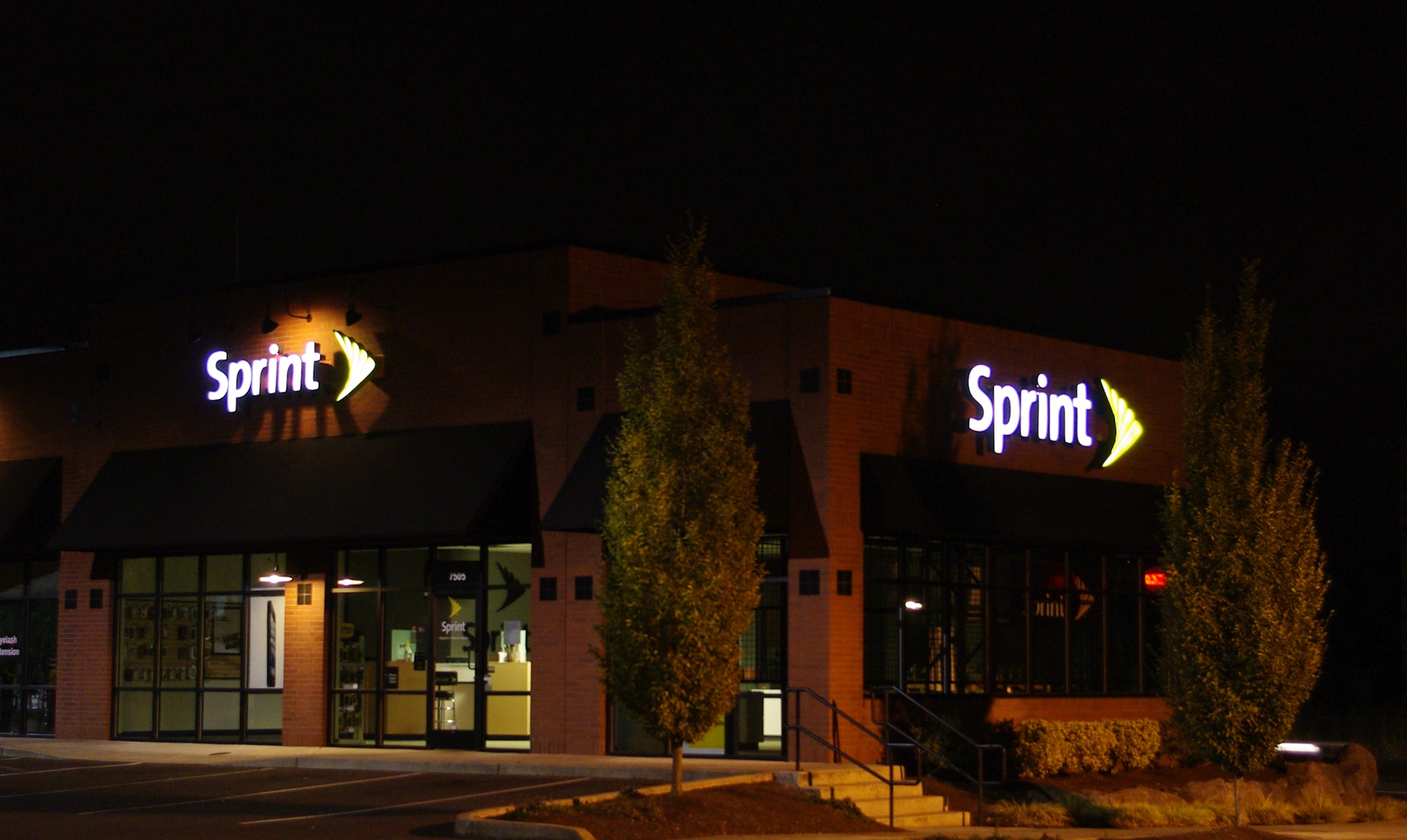
This "Sprint Store by ccComm" located in Hillsboro, Oregon sells Sprint-branded wireless products and services exclusively.

=== Sprint branded services ===
Sprint Corporation offered postpaid wireless voice and data services primarily under the Sprint brand.

=== Sprint Prepaid Group ===
The Sprint Prepaid Group was a division of the company formed in May 2010 that is responsible for the operations of Sprint's pre-pay subsidiaries. SPG's branded products and services are sold via web and available at retailers nationwide, including Best Buy, Walmart, Target and other independent dealers.

==== Boost Mobile ====
Boost Worldwide, Inc. was a wholly owned subsidiary of Sprint that provides nationwide, prepaid wireless voice, messaging and broadband data products and services to customers in the contiguous United States under the Boost Mobile brand. The services are provided as an MVNO hosted on the Sprint-owned CDMA, EVDO, WiMAX, LTE, and LTE Advanced networks.

=== Sprint Smart Velocity ===
Sprint Velocity was Sprint Corporation's Connected Vehicle Platform, announced in 2012 in partnership with Chrysler.

== Wireless wholesale operations and affiliates ==
Sprint Corporation provided services using both its own spectrum and network equipment through affiliate agreements. Smaller affiliated companies operated their own network assets and retail operations but offered services to customers in their geographic region under the Sprint brand.

In the early stages of network build-out, the company relied significantly on network partners known as affiliates to rapidly expand its coverage. These affiliates would lease Sprint's PCS spectrum licenses in a specific geographic area, typically rural areas, and smaller cities, and provide wireless service using the Sprint brand. Sprint provided back-end support such as billing and telephone–based customer service, while the affiliates built and maintained the network, sold equipment to customers, and staffed the retail stores in their specific regions. Its customers could "roam" across Sprint-operated and affiliate-operated portions of the network without being aware of the distinction, and vice versa. Outwardly, efforts were made to make it appear as if the network was operated by a single entity under the Sprint name, though complex revenue-sharing agreements were in place which was very similar in nature to cross-carrier roaming tariffs. In later years, the relationship between Sprint and its affiliates grew contentious, particularly after Sprint's acquisition of Nextel. Various affiliates included Swiftel Communications in Brookings, South Dakota; Shentel in northern Virginia, and parts of Pennsylvania, Maryland, and West Virginia.

=== Sprint Rural Alliance ===
Sprint Rural Alliance (SRA) members (aka Sprint Partners) were carriers who used their own equipment and also sold their own service under their own name while using Sprint spectrum. Sprint was given access to the SRA network in return for allowing the use of Sprint spectrum. This allowed Sprint to keep the spectrum license for the geographic area being served by the SRA member. Alaska DigiTel in Alaska was an SRA Member. Former SRA Members included Alltel Wireless in Montana; This portion of the network was obtained by AT&T during the merger of Alltel and Verizon Wireless, Pioneer Cellular in Kansas and Oklahoma; they ended their agreement with Sprint on March 1, 2012, and transitioned to an agreement with Verizon through the LTE in Rural America program, nTelos; operated in West Virginia and was bought out and merged with Shentel which was a Sprint Affiliate.

=== Mobile virtual network operators (MVNOs) ===
Sprint Corporation provided capacity on its CDMA2000, EVDO, and LTE wireless networks to mobile virtual network operators (MVNOs), which allowed other wireless providers to utilize its networks to offer its services. Sprint's prepaid brands operated using Sprint's networks, though they were not MVNOs, but rather wholly owned prepaid subsidiaries of the company.

==== Bring Your Own Sprint Device ====
Sprint Corporation allowed certain Sprint MVNOs to accept and activate old Sprint-branded phones through its "Bring Your Own Sprint Device" program which was established for Sprint's initiative to further reduce the number of cell phones that were thrown away each year. The program was also beneficial to MVNOs customers who did not want to pay subsidized prices.

==== Custom Branded Device Program ====
Sprint Corporation offered its MVNOs a program called the "Custom Branded Device Program", which gave MVNOs access to completely unbranded Android smartphones with no references to Sprint that the MVNO could then customize with its own branded apps and services through Sprint's Mobile ID and Mobile Zone products. Though these phones were free of Sprint branding, they were certified to run on Sprint networks.

=== Data roaming agreements ===
On May 9, 2006, Sprint Nextel and Alltel agreed on a new Nationwide Roaming partnership. It was reciprocal, and gave Alltel customers access to the Sprint 1x and EV-DO network and Sprint customers access to Alltel's denser, rural 1x and EV-DO voice and data network. The roaming reciprocity agreement between Alltel and Sprint was set to expire in 2016.

Sprint and Verizon Wireless had a reciprocal data roaming agreement that allowed for the use of Sprint Power Vision content like TV, movie downloads, and stream radio in Verizon 1x and EVDO coverage areas.

Sprint also had a reciprocal 1xRTT, EVDO and LTE data and voice roaming agreement with U.S. Cellular. Sprint had an LTE roaming agreement with AT&T as well, which was typically limited to 3G speeds. Several cases of Sprint phones simultaneously roaming on Verizon's CDMA network for voice and AT&T's LTE network for data were observed in 2017.

In 2018, with the announcement of the Sprint and T-Mobile merger, Sprint gained access to roaming on T-Mobile's LTE network until the Sprint network was discontinued. Roaming on T-Mobile was counted as native data usage and had no speed restrictions.

== Wireless networks ==
The following is a list of known CDMA, LTE, and NR frequencies which Sprint employed in the United States:

Frequency Band	Band Number	Protocol	Generation	Status	Notes
800 MHz; Sec. 800 MHz	BC10	IS-95/1xRTT/ EVDO/1X Advanced	2G/3G	Decommissioned	Sprint's CDMA network was completely shut down on May 31, 2022.
1.9 GHz PCS	BC1/BC14	IS-95/1xRTT/ EVDO/1X Advanced	2G/3G	Decommissioned	Sprint's CDMA network was completely shut down on May 31, 2022.
700 MHz Upper C Block	13	LTE/LTE-A	4G	Decommissioned	Limited to Puerto Rico and the USVI. Previously operated under the Open Mobile brand. Sprint's LTE network was completely shut down on June 30, 2022.
850 MHz E-CLR	26	LTE/LTE-A	4G	Decommissioned	Sprint's LTE network was completely shut down on June 30, 2022.
1.9 GHz E-PCS	25	LTE/LTE-A	4G	Decommissioned	Sprint's LTE network was completely shut down on June 30, 2022.
2.5 GHz BRS/EBS	41	LTE/LTE-A	4G	Decommissioned	Sprint's LTE network was completely shut down on June 30, 2022.
5.2 GHz U-NII	46	LTE/LTE-A	4G	Decommissioned	Sprint's LTE network was completely shut down on June 30, 2022.
2.5 GHz BRS/EBS	n41	NR	5G	Decommissioned	Sprint's 5G network was shut down by T-Mobile on July 1, 2020.

=== CDMA ===
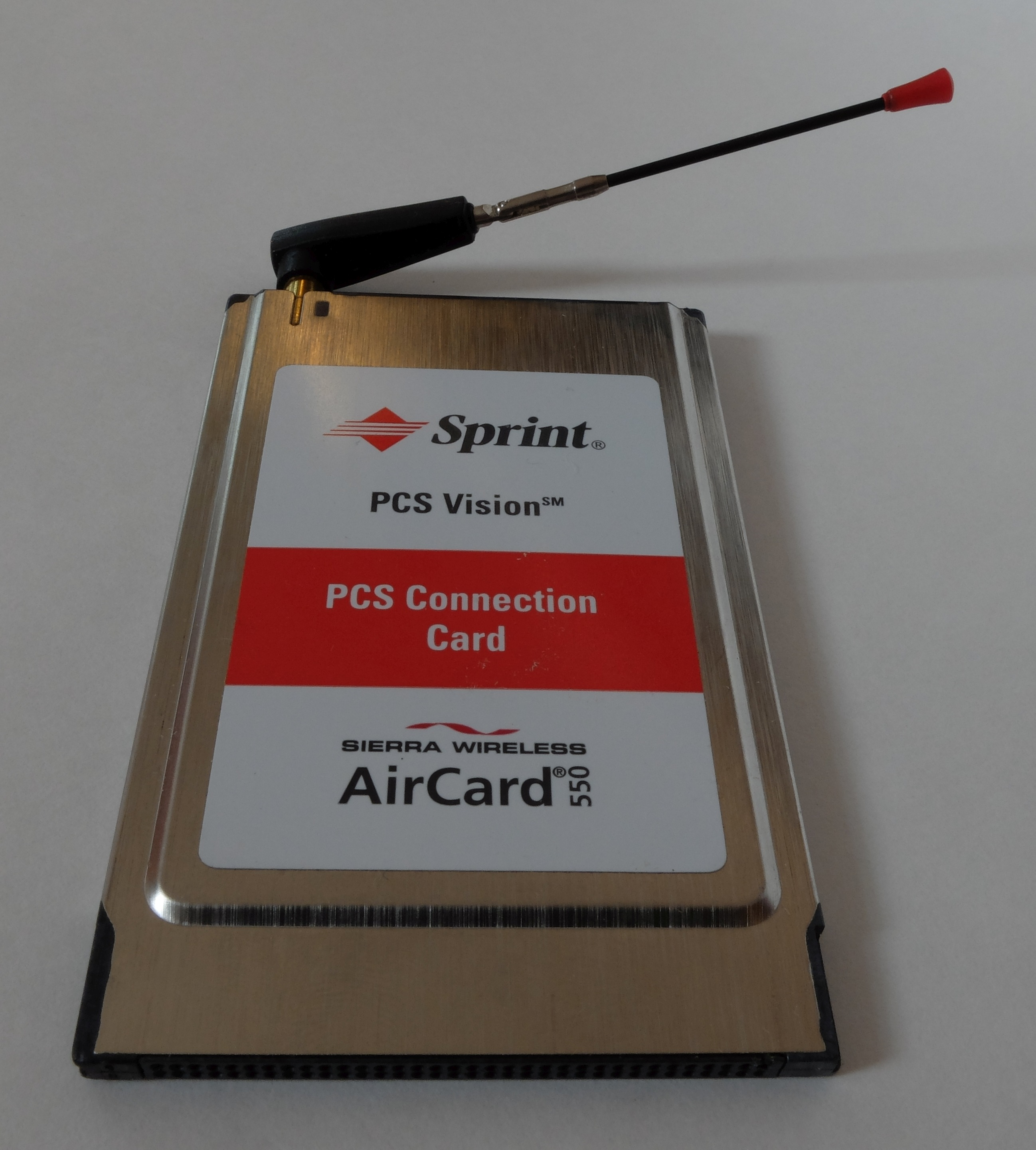
Sierra Wireless AirCard 550 modem for connecting a laptop to Sprint's "PCS Vision" network

Sprint operated a nationwide CDMA network in the 1.9 GHz PCS band. In 2006, Sprint's EV-DO "Power Vision" network reached more than 190 million people. Sprint then continued to upgrade their 3G EV-DO network until it reached 260 million people in 2007. Sprint eventually covered over 300 million PoPs with EV-DO services. Sprint added eHRPD to its network (EV-DO routed through an LTE core network) in order to facilitate smooth handoffs between LTE and EV-DO.

As a result of the Merger with T-Mobile US, Sprint's CDMA network was completely shut down on May 31, 2022.

=== LTE ===
On July 28, 2011, Sprint announced that it had decided to end its rollout of the 4G network using WiMAX technology, in favor of more internationally accepted LTE technology. Sprint had also announced that it entered into a 15-year agreement that included spectrum hosting, network services, 4G wholesale and 3G roaming, with LightSquared. That deal, however, was later dissolved due to regulatory issues which LightSquared was unable to resolve with the FCC.

Sprint announced initial LTE deployment plans at the Sprint Strategy Update conference on October 7, 2011. Network Vision-partner Samsung began LTE deployments on October 27, 2011, in Chicago, Illinois. Sprint projected that the LTE network would cover 123 million people in 2012 and over 250 million people by the end of 2013.

On January 5, 2012, Sprint announced via Twitter its first 4G LTE markets, that included Atlanta, Dallas, Houston, and San Antonio; on June 27, 2012, Sprint stated that it would launch its new 4G LTE network in the first five markets the following month and on July 15, 2012, Sprint commenced operating the LTE network. In addition to the five announced markets, it was launched in 10 other markets, with more markets to be covered by the end of the year.

Sprint initially deployed LTE in the 1900 MHz PCS G block, and over time added LTE to its 1900-MHz PCS A-F block spectrum. Sprint also deployed LTE in the 850-MHz E-CLR band and the 2500-MHz BRS/EBS band.

In February 2013, Sprint's Prepaid Group, which operated Virgin Mobile USA and Boost Mobile, began offering products and services using Sprint's LTE network.

On April 15, 2016, it was reported that Sprint covered more than 300 million PoPs with LTE services.

Sprint eventually rolled out VoLTE, although the deployment was initially limited to select markets. iOS devices newer than the iPhone 8, as well as a few select Android flagship devices, supported VoLTE on Sprint. VoLTE and Wi-Fi Calling are interoperable, and devices can transfer calls between the two networks. Calls initiated on Wi-Fi by non-VoLTE devices will transfer calls to the LTE network if Wi-Fi coverage becomes too weak to sustain the call, although they are unable to initiate calls on LTE.

As a result of the Merger with T-Mobile US, the Sprint LTE network was shut down on June 30, 2022.

== Wireless products and services ==
=== Mobile devices ===
Sprint offered a variety of wireless and mobile broadband products from a full range of manufacturers, that were preloaded with mobile operating systems including Google's Android or Apple's iOS. Sprint's partner device manufactures included Apple, BlackBerry, HTC, Kyocera, LG, Motorola, Samsung, Sharp, Sonim, and ZTE.

=== Broadband for the home via Sprint Mobile ===
In order to offer broadband directly to the home, Sprint launched a co-branded Broadband Wireless Access Point device along with Linksys, a unit of Cisco Systems. This unit allowed Sprint customers to set up a special network in a home or office computer network, connecting multiple computers or laptops wirelessly to Sprint's PowerVision network. This broadband service to the Internet allowed some customers to have broadband without paying for telephone service. The PowerVision router allowed one to bypass the local telephone and cable broadband service providers. Such Broadband offerings to the home or office without cable or DSL meant the router could be used to provide cheaper VoIP services through Sprint's high-speed network.

=== Sprint Music Plus ===
On October 31, 2005, the Sprint Music Store was launched. Initial record-label participation included EMI Music, Sony BMG Music Entertainment, Warner Music Group, and Universal Music Group. On November 1, 2006, after one year of service, the store had sold more than 8 million songs, partly thanks to the five free songs it offered customers at launch. On April 1, 2007, the Sprint Music Store started offering music downloads at the price of 99 cents per track to customers who agreed to subscribe to a Vision pack of $15 or higher.

The service was rebranded as Sprint Music Plus in 2011, managed by RealNetworks. It offered full-track music files from various labels (albums and single tracks), ringback tones, and ringtones. From July 2013, Sprint Music Plus app was managed by OnMobile Global, a company headquartered in Bangalore, India.

=== Google Play ===
On May 16, 2012, Sprint began to allow subscribers to bill application purchases from Google Play to their phone account.

=== Sprint Airave and Magic Box ===
On September 17, 2007, Sprint Nextel launched the Airave, which increased cell reception over an area of 5,000 square feet (460 m^{2}) and could handle up to three calls at once by hooking into an existing broadband connection and using VOIP. The Airave helped eliminate poor signal quality inside buildings. Airave was used only for voice calls using a Sprint CDMA phone and was unavailable for Nextel iDEN phones or data cards/USB modems. By default, the Airave unit allowed any Sprint phone to connect through it, but it could be reconfigured to accept only connections from up to 50 authorized numbers in order to eliminate unwanted use. The Airrave used the customers' own bandwidth to connect calls—potentially slowing internet speeds on less ample connections, and causing the customer to essentially subsidize the Sprint network. Sprint was one of the only carriers that had not charged its customers for this type of device if the customer demonstrated that Sprint coverage was inadequate where they lived.

Airave 2.0 was a device that supported up to six devices simultaneously and data usage. The device required a land-based internet service (such as DSL or cable modem) to produce the CDMA signal. The Airave 2.5 improved reliability and had two LAN ports.

Airave 3.0 was a device that broadcast both CDMA and LTE using band 41 that was approved by the FCC in late 2016 and became available in 2017. It required a cable internet connection and included a WAN RJ45 port and two RJ45 Ethernet LAN ports.

The Magic Box created its own Band 41 LTE signal and used Band 41 or Band 25 LTE signals instead of a cable connection for the internet. It was designed to be placed on a window sill and broadcast to the inside of a building plus outside the building for 100 meters or further.

== Defunct brands and networks ==
=== CLEAR ===
CLEAR was the brand of mobile broadband services offered by Clearwire Corporation, which was acquired by Sprint Nextel in July 2013. The brand provided mobile and fixed wireless broadband communications services to retail and wholesale customers in Belgium, Spain, and the United States. Sprint ended the CLEAR brand in September 2013 shortly after it closed its acquisition of Clearwire, and it stopped offering CLEAR-branded products and services to new customers.

=== Common Cents Mobile ===

Sprint Nextel began offering pre-paid wireless products and services via wholly owned MVNO Common Cents Mobile on May 13, 2010. Sprint Nextel intended these products and services as a lower-cost alternative, charging $.07 per minute for voice calls with round-down timing and $.07 per text message. The products and services were initially available through Walmart stores; Sprint Nextel had planned to expand the distribution of Common Cents Mobile to other outlets, but never did.

On May 18, 2011, Sprint Nextel discontinued operating its Common Cents Mobile pre-paid brand, on the basis, it was a duplicate of the offerings of the Virgin Mobile USA PayLo brand. Common Cents Mobile customers were transitioned to a Virgin Mobile payLo service plan that allowed the former Common Cents Mobile customers to keep their existing $.07 per minute rate.

=== Nextel Direct Connect ===
Sprint Nextel decided to decommission the iDEN (Nextel National) network it had acquired after merging with Nextel Communications in order to repurpose the network for LTE coverage, Sprint stopped offering Nextel Direct Connect walkie-talkie service. Instead, Sprint persuades many of its customers into their replacement service – Sprint Direct Connect which operates on the CDMA network.

=== Virgin Mobile and Assurance Wireless ===
Virgin Mobile USA, L.P. was a wholly owned subsidiary of Sprint Corporation and provided nationwide, prepaid wireless voice, messaging, and broadband data products and services to customers in the contiguous United States under the Virgin Mobile, payLo, and "Assurance Wireless Brought to You by Virgin Mobile" brands. It operated as an MVNO and provided services to its customers via the Sprint-owned CDMA, EVDO, WiMAX, and LTE networks.

Virgin Mobile USA, L.P. also offered lifeline telephone service subsidized by the U.S. Federal Communications Commission's Universal Service Fund under the "Assurance Wireless Brought to You by Virgin Mobile" brand. The program offers a free wireless phone and 250 free local and domestic long-distance voice minutes per month to eligible low-income customers in 31 states. End users do not receive a bill, nor are they required to sign a contract, and do not pay activation fees, recurring fees, or surcharges.

=== Discontinued networks ===
==== iDEN ====
Sprint Nextel operated an iDEN nationwide network in the 800 MHz and 900 MHz SMR frequency band. Sprint Corporation acquired the iDEN network as a result of its merger with Nextel Communications in 2005. The iDEN network was originally deployed as a dispatch radio service and is unique in blending the half-duplex push-to-talk one-to-many broadcast capability of a walkie-talkie with the one-to-one private communication of a phone. Sprint later marketed "push-to-talk" services under the Nextel Direct Connect name.

In October 2010, as part of the "Network Vision" plan, Sprint CEO Dan Hesse announced the decommissioning of the iDEN network to reduce costs, improve the coverage and performance of the 3G CDMA network and enable Sprint Nextel to focus on 4G LTE technology. Sprint Nextel announced on May 29, 2012, that it will stop marketing iDEN devices in the third quarter of 2012 and that the iDEN network could be completely decommissioned "as early as June 30, 2013". As of June 5, 2012, Sprint and Boost Mobile ceased offering iDEN devices, removing the devices and their associated service plans from the Sprint and Boost Mobile websites and retail locations. The Nextel national network was shut down on schedule at 12:01 am on June 30, 2013.

Radio frequency range	Band number	Generation	Radio Interface	Status
800 MHz ESMR	N/A	2G	iDEN	Decommissioned
900 MHz ESMR	N/A	2G	iDEN	Decommissioned

==== WiMAX ====
Sprint Corporation operated a 4G WiMAX network in the 2.5 GHz band, which had been operated by Clearwire Corporation before it was acquired. Sprint also provided its prepay partners Boost Mobile and Virgin Mobile access to data services via the WiMAX network; including other Mobile virtual network operators under wholesale agreements.

Sprint Nextel had won rights to radio spectrum in the 2.5 GHz band to provision fourth-generation services and began to build out a WiMAX network, offering services under the Xohm brand. However, on May 7, 2008, Sprint Nextel announced it would merge its WiMAX wireless broadband unit with Clearwire Corporation, receiving equity in Clearwire in return. The two companies completed the transaction on November 28, 2008. Sprint became the owner of Clearwire, after outbidding Dish Network for the company.

On October 8, 2008, Sprint Nextel launched WiMAX in Baltimore and showed off several new laptops that will have embedded WiMAX chips. They announced that Sprint will be offering dual-mode 3G/4G products by the end of the year. Baltimore was the first city to get Xohm, but it was launched soon after in more cities, such as Chicago and Philadelphia.

On April 19, 2011, Sprint Nextel announced it agreed to pay at least $1 billion to Clearwire so it can operate on the 4G WiMAX network through 2012, and a later agreement, announced in December 2011, specified terms allowing Sprint, its subsidiaries, and wholesale customers to continue having access to the Clearwire 4G WiMAX network through 2015. On July 9, 2013, Sprint Nextel acquired the remaining stock shares it did not already own in Clearwire and its assets.

Sprint Corporation is working on migrating WiMAX customers to LTE compatible devices in order to begin transitioning the WiMAX bands to TDD LTE. In July 2013, Sprint announced its first tri-band products capable of accessing TDD-LTE data connections in the 2.5 GHz band still used for WiMAX.

Sprint planned to shut its WiMAX network on November 6, 2015, however, an emergency injunction was granted by a judge of the Massachusetts Superior Court on November 5, 2015, to keep the WiMax network online for another 90 days, due to the ongoing lawsuit from non-profit groups. The groups, Mobile Beacon and Mobile Citizen, said that the network shutdown violates the contract which requires Sprint to provide high-speed internet services for low-income families and public institutions, as most of the equipment was still not LTE-compatible. Sprint pledged to provide upgrades to the equipment and work out a solution with the groups as soon as possible. Most of the WiMax network not running in the affected areas were shut down. On February 1, 2016, the same court declared that Sprint can proceed with the network shutdown in the remaining 75 cities. Sprint took the network of 16 cities, including New York City, offline on February 2, 2016, and closed 39 more on February 29, 2016. On March 31, 2016, the last 25 cities' networks were shut down.

== Controversies ==
=== Device unlocking ===
For devices launched after February 15, 2015, Sprint unlocked phones when Lease/Service/Billing Agreements were satisfied and accounts were in good standing.

For devices launched before February 15, 2015, Sprint did not authorize the use of GSM-capable devices, including both phones and tablets it sold, on a United States–based competitor's network, such as T-Mobile or AT&T. Unlike the aforementioned companies, which have comparatively lenient policies about unlocking phones, such as when the device is paid off or the contract is fulfilled, and Verizon, whose GSM-capable devices ship with the GSM portion already unlocked, Sprint only unlocked devices for international use for customers in good standing after contacting customer support.

This limitation meant phones and tablets sold by Sprint that were launched prior to February 15, 2015, only lawfully functioned on the Sprint network, a policy that prevented what may have otherwise been compatibility with another carrier's network. Additionally, iPhones sold by Sprint generally had the lowest resale value of devices sold by the top four carriers in the US. Means to unlock a GSM-capable iPhone existed, such as using a SIM interposer, but the device may not have functioned fully or correctly on the desired network, and unlocking of the device was a violation of the law under the terms of the DMCA up until August 1, 2014, when President Obama signed into law a bill allowing the unlocking of cell phones.

=== FCC fine over Do Not Call rule breaches ===
In May 2014, the company was fined $7.5 million by the U.S. Federal Communications Commission for failing to honor consumer requests to opt-out of marketing messages delivered by phone and text messages. Sprint was ordered to implement a comprehensive two-year plan to comply with the commission's rules including training of Sprint employees on how to comply with Do Not Call rules. American consumers have had the option of nominating not to receive telemarketing calls and texts since 2003, by placing their names on the National Do Not Call Registry.

=== Law compliance ===
As required by law in the United States, in response to court orders and warrants, Sprint Nextel provided law enforcement agencies with its wireless subscribers' GPS locations over 8 million times in one year between September 2008 and October 2009. The disclosures occurred by way of a special, secure portal which Sprint developed specifically for government officials, which enabled users to automatically obtain Sprint customers' GPS locations after the request has been reviewed and activated by Sprint's surveillance department.

== Marketing ==
=== Advertising ===
In 2016, Sprint began a major television advertising campaign that promoted its reliability as being within 1% of other major providers, such as Verizon. The advertisements featured Paul Marcarelli, an American actor once known for pitching Verizon with the phrase "Can you hear me now?" In the ads, Marcarelli noted that he had switched to Sprint and touted pricing of approximately half that of other providers, commenting "Can you hear that?" The ads featured the slogan "Don't let a 1% difference cost you twice as much."

=== Sponsorships ===
Sprint was the official wireless sponsor of the 2007 MTV Video Music Awards. Sprint Power Vision customers were able to watch the VMAs on a live simulcast on their Sprint Power Vision handset free of charge.

In Time Magazine's November 13, 2006, issue, Sprint Nextel's NASCAR FanView was named One of Best Inventions of 2006. The NASCAR FanView is a portable PDA that runs on Sprint's data network. The device offers fans access to "Race telecast and up to seven in-car camera channels, direct audio feeds allowing the user to listen to live driver and team conversations, as well as the radio broadcast and an exclusive audio-replay feature."

From 2008 to 2016, Sprint Corporation was the major title sponsor of NASCAR's top racing series, formerly called the NEXTEL Cup, which became known as the Sprint Cup Series on February 9, 2008. Since then, Sprint signed a contract extension with NASCAR to continue sponsoring the series through the 2016 season. Sprint was replaced by Monster Energy after the 2016 season.

Sprint Corporation held the naming rights to the Sprint Center in Kansas City, Missouri; after the merger in 2020, the arena was renamed the T-Mobile Center (not to be confused with T-Mobile Arena in Las Vegas).

Sprint Nextel announced in December 2011 that it reached a multi-year exclusive partnership with the National Basketball Association (NBA) to be the league's official wireless service partner.

Sprint was also a sponsor for the Copa América Centenario in 2016.

== See also ==
- Open Handset Alliance
- SoftBank Corporation
