= Embarq =

American technology company

Embarq Corporation

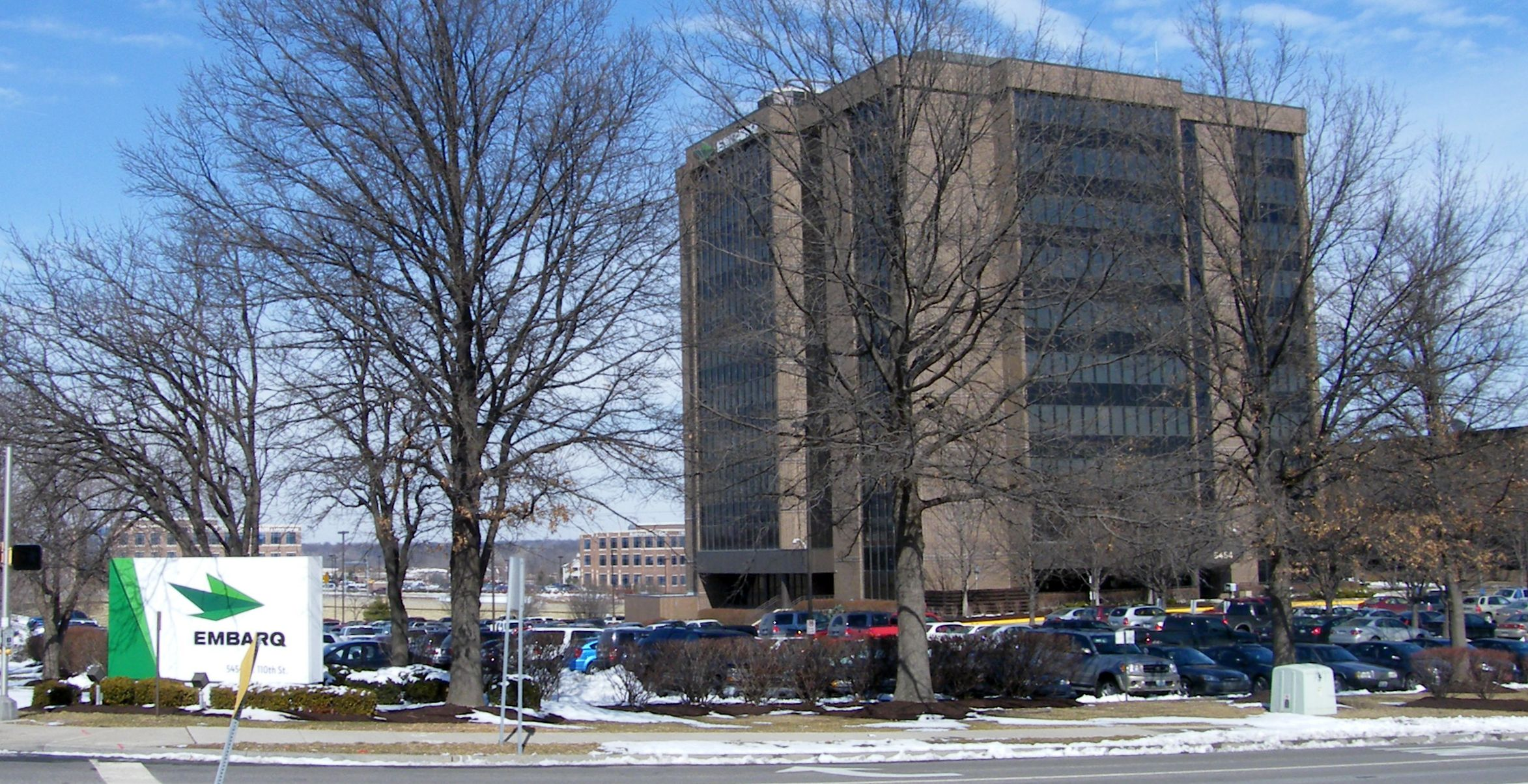
- Embarq's former headquarters in Overland Park, Kansas.
- Type: Subsidiary
- Traded as: NYSE: EQ
- Industry: Telecom Service - Domestic
- Predecessor: Sprint Corporation (connectivity business)
- Founded: May 17, 2006; 20 years ago
- Defunct: July 1, 2009; 17 years ago
- Successor: CenturyTel
- Headquarters: Overland Park, Kansas, U.S.
- Area served: 18 states
- Services: Telecommunications
- Revenue: ▲$6.363 billion USD (2006)
- Number of employees: 18,000 (2007)
- Parent: Sprint Nextel (2006); CenturyTel (2009)
- Subsidiaries: Centel; United Telephone Companies
- Website: https://www.embarq.com Archived 14 March 2009 at the Wayback Machine

Embarq Corporation was the largest independent local exchange carrier in the United States (below the Baby Bells), serving customers in 18 states and providing local, long-distance, high-speed data and wireless services to residential and business customers. It had been formerly the local telephone division (LTD) of Sprint Nextel until 2006, when it was spun off as an independent company. Embarq produced more than $6 billion in revenues annually, and had approximately 18,000 employees. It was based in Overland Park, Kansas.

In 2009, it was purchased by CenturyTel, which rebranded as CenturyLink (now known as Lumen Technologies) after the merger.

== History ==
=== Brown Telephone Company ===
C. L. Brown founded Brown Telephone Company in the small town of Abilene, Kansas. The company was a landline telephone company that operated as a competitor to the Bell System. Brown acquired a number of other local telephone companies, merging them under the name United Telephone Company in 1911.

=== United Telecom ===
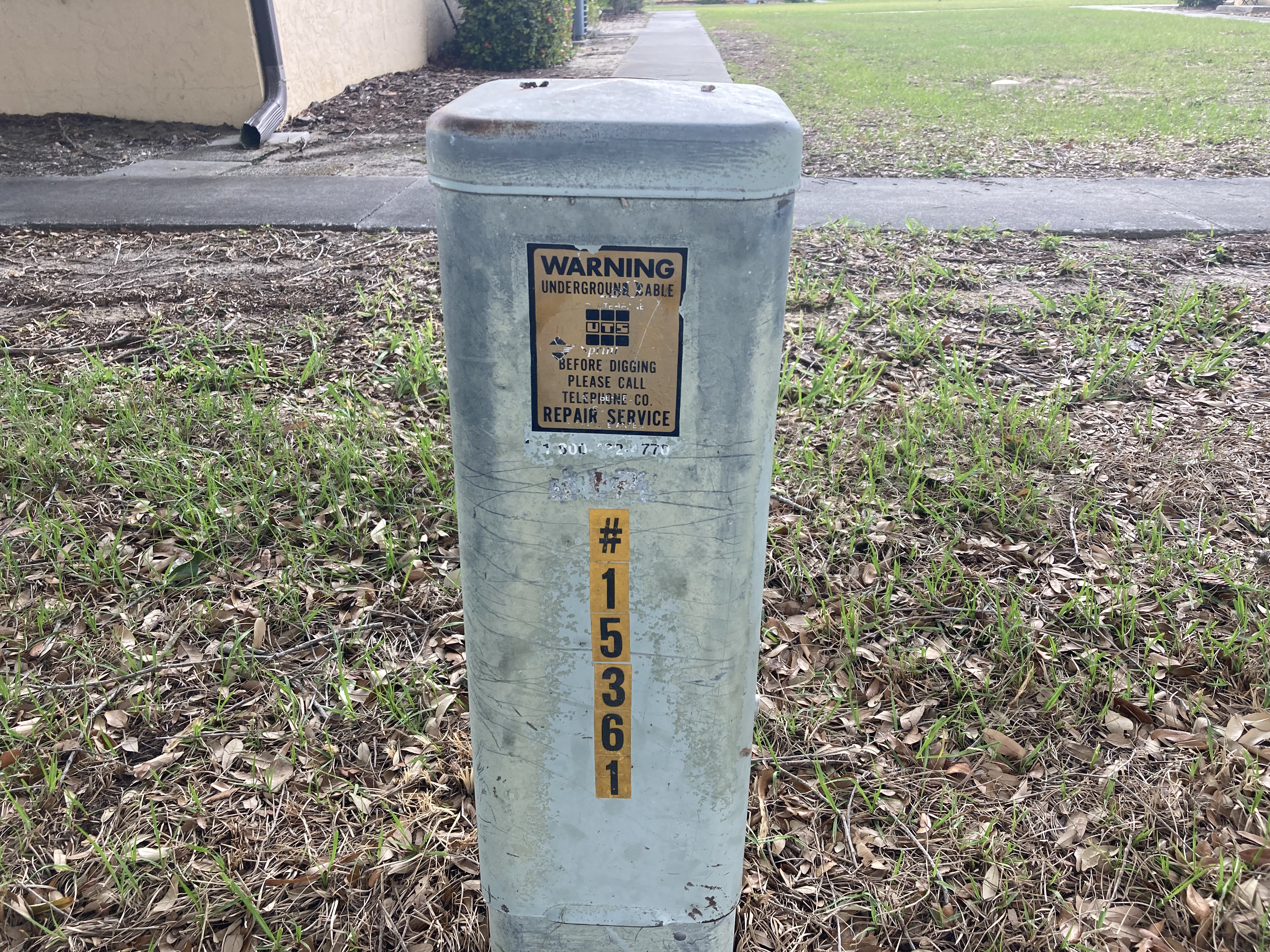
A termination block station in Port Charlotte, Florida with United Telecom markings.

In 1938, after emerging from bankruptcy, United Telephone Company became United Utilities. The company grew steadily through acquisitions and changed its name to United Telecommunications in 1972, at which time it provided local telephone service in many areas of the Midwest and South. United Telecom also operated many other types of businesses. United Telecommunications United Information Systems (UIS) group acquired On-Line Systems, Inc, a company that offers business and database applications hosted on DEC time-sharing systems ca. 1980. In 1980 United Telecom launched a national X.25 data service, Uninet. To enter the long-distance voice market, United Telecom acquired ISACOMM in 1981 and US Telephone in 1984.

=== Sprint ===
Southern Pacific Communications Company (SPCC), a unit of the Southern Pacific Railroad, began providing long-distance telephone service shortly after the MCI Telecommunications Corp. v. FCC (Execunet II) decision late in 1978. The railroad had an extensive microwave communications system along its rights of way used for internal communications. In 1972 they began selling surplus time on that system to corporations for use as their own Private Line Network, thereby circumventing AT&T's then-monopoly on public telephony, later expanding to fiber optic cables laid along those same rights of way subsequent to the Execunet II decision late in 1978. Prior attempts at offering long-distance service were not approved by the Federal Communications Commission, though the company's fax service (SpeedFAX) had been permitted. SPCC was headquartered on Adrian Road, in Burlingame, California.

As mentioned above, SPCC was only permitted to provide Private Line service and not switched services. When MCI Communications released EXECUNET, SPCC went to court with the FCC to get the right to offer switched services.

The SPRINT service was first marketed to six metropolitan areas, New York City, Boston, Philadelphia, Los Angeles, San Diego and Anaheim. The switches were located in Los Angeles and New York. A customer, required to have a Private Line connection to one of these switches in order to use the service, paid an access fee per Private Line. The customer was then billed at 2.6 cents per tenth of a minute increment.

Southern Pacific Communications became part of GTE in 1982 under the name GTE Sprint. GTE had previously acquired a national X.25 provider, Telenet, in 1979.

In 1986, GTE Sprint was merged with GTE Telenet, US Telecom, Uninet, and ISACOMM to form US Sprint. This was a partnership owned by GTE and United Telecom. In 1989 United Telecom purchased controlling interest in US Sprint. In 1991 United Telecom completed its acquisition of US Sprint. That same year United Telecom changed its name to Sprint due in large part to the increased brand recognition of Sprint, as a result of the successful Candice Bergen "Dime Lady" advertisement campaign.

In 1983, United Telecom's Telespectrum began offering cellular telephone services in United's territories. In 1988, Telespectrum was sold to Centel for $763 million to fund United's purchase of an additional 30% of U.S. Sprint. This purchase gave United operational control of US Sprint.

In 1993, Sprint merged with Centel, which allowed Sprint to provide local service in a total of 18 states and put them back in the wireless business. In late 1994 and early 1995, Sprint via Sprint Spectrum (a joint venture between Sprint and several cable companies) acquired near nationwide PCS spectrum. Later in 1995 the company began to offer wireless service under the Sprint PCS brand.

On October 5, 1999, Sprint and MCI WorldCom announced a $129 billion merger agreement between the two companies. The deal would have been the largest corporate merger in history at the time. However, the deal did not go through because of pressure from the United States Department of Justice and the European Union on concerns of it creating a monopoly.

In 2003, Sprint began recombining their local telecom, long-distance, wireline, and wireless business units into a new company, marketing the combined company as "One Sprint". In April 2004, the separately traded wireless tracking stock, "PCS", was absorbed into the New York Stock Exchange (NYSE) "FON" ticker symbol, Sprint's former ticker symbol. (FON stood for "Fiber Optic Network", which was Sprint's bragging right, but was also a homophone of the word "phone"). This was challenged in many lawsuits by Sprint PCS shareholders claiming the stock was devalued through the ratio of 1 share of PCS stock for 1/2 share of FON stock. Sprint agreed to settle with the shareholders for $57.5 million.

=== Merger with Nextel and Embarq spinoff ===
In December 2004, Sprint announced it would acquire NEXTEL Communications, renaming itself Sprint Nextel, and planned to spin off their local telephone operations. The $35 billion deal was completed in August 2005. In February 2006, the new name and logo for the spin-off, which is called Embarq, were revealed. The spin-off was completed in May 2006.

=== Acquisition by CenturyTel ===
On October 27, 2008, Embarq announced that it would be acquired by Monroe, Louisiana-based CenturyTel, Inc. in an all-stock transaction valued at $11.6 billion, including the assumption of $5.8 billion in Embarq's debt. CenturyTel's CEO Glen Post became CEO of the combined company. On June 2, 2009, CenturyTel and Embarq announced that the combined entity would be called CenturyLink. The acquisition was completed on July 1, 2009. The change to CenturyLink took place in October 2009.

== Former coverage area ==
Embarq's coverage territory included that of the former incumbent local exchange carrier companies of Carolina Telephone & Telegraph, United Telephone Company, and Centel. Embarq provided its local service in 19 states.

== Products ==
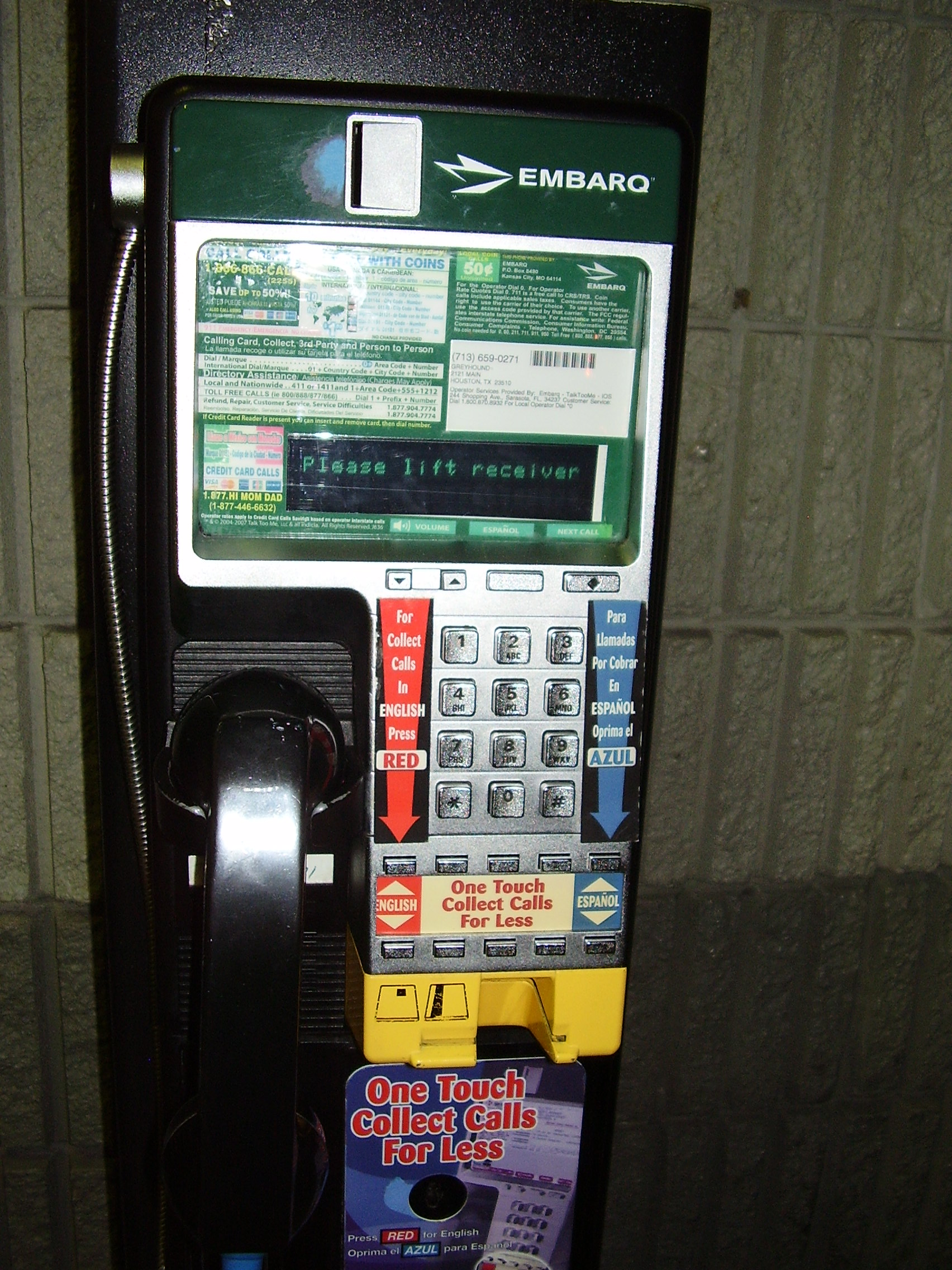
Embarq pay phone

Embarq focused on sales of landline telephone service, high-speed internet, and DISH Network satellite TV. Embarq offered bundled services to their customers, with the convenience of one monthly bill and offered discounts for adding additional services.

Embarq telephone service was a traditional landline Plain-old telephone system (POTS). Common offerings included features such as Caller ID, Call waiting, 3-way calling, Call forwarding, Voice mail, and Anonymous call rejection.

Embarq offered many long-distance plans, including unlimited domestic direct-dialed calling.

Depending on market and geographical region, Embarq offered several high-speed internet technologies. Embarq covered the majority of their territory with ADSL at speeds of 768 kbit/s, 1.5 Mbit/s, 3.0 Mbit/s, or 5.0 Mbit/s as line conditions allowed. In September 2007 Embarq began offering 10.0 Mbit/s to customers in Las Vegas. Beginning in January 2008, Embarq released the 10 Mbit/s tier across their entire footprint. Embarq offered fiber-to-the-premises (FTTP) in additional markets, such as parts of Las Vegas, Nevada, North Carolina and Florida.

Embarq had an established partnership with Dish Network and offered a comprehensive lineup of DISH Network services to its customers. Discounts were available when eligible DISH Network programming was bundled with other qualifying Embarq products. In addition to the DISH Network partnership, Embarq also planned to test a TV service (tentatively called Embarq TV) in the near future. Details were scarce, but the service was rumored to have been an IPTV fiber-to-the-node service similar to AT&T's U-verse. Testing was completed and Embarq/CenturyLink rolled out IPTV to its customer base in Jefferson City, MO in October 2009. CenturyTel is providing its IPTV feed to the Jefferson City switching office from its service in Columbia, MO. CenturyLink now offers its Prism TV service in select markets, which was based on Embarq TV. Legacy Embarq customers who have DISH Network can still bundle their service with CenturyLink, but only under a grandfather clause; new customers can only get DirecTV if Prism TV isn't available.

Embarq provided business wireless phone service throughout much of its territory. Embarq operated as a Mobile Virtual Network Operator (MVNO) for Sprint PCS. Embarq utilized the CDMA band, and their handsets connect primarily to Sprint PCS towers. However, Embarq handsets were also capable of roaming onto CDMA networks from other carriers.

Embarq DSL customers were offered free EarthLink services until the formation of Myembarq.com. In February 2007, Embarq customers were required to switch to Myembarq and Embarqmail.

== Criticisms ==
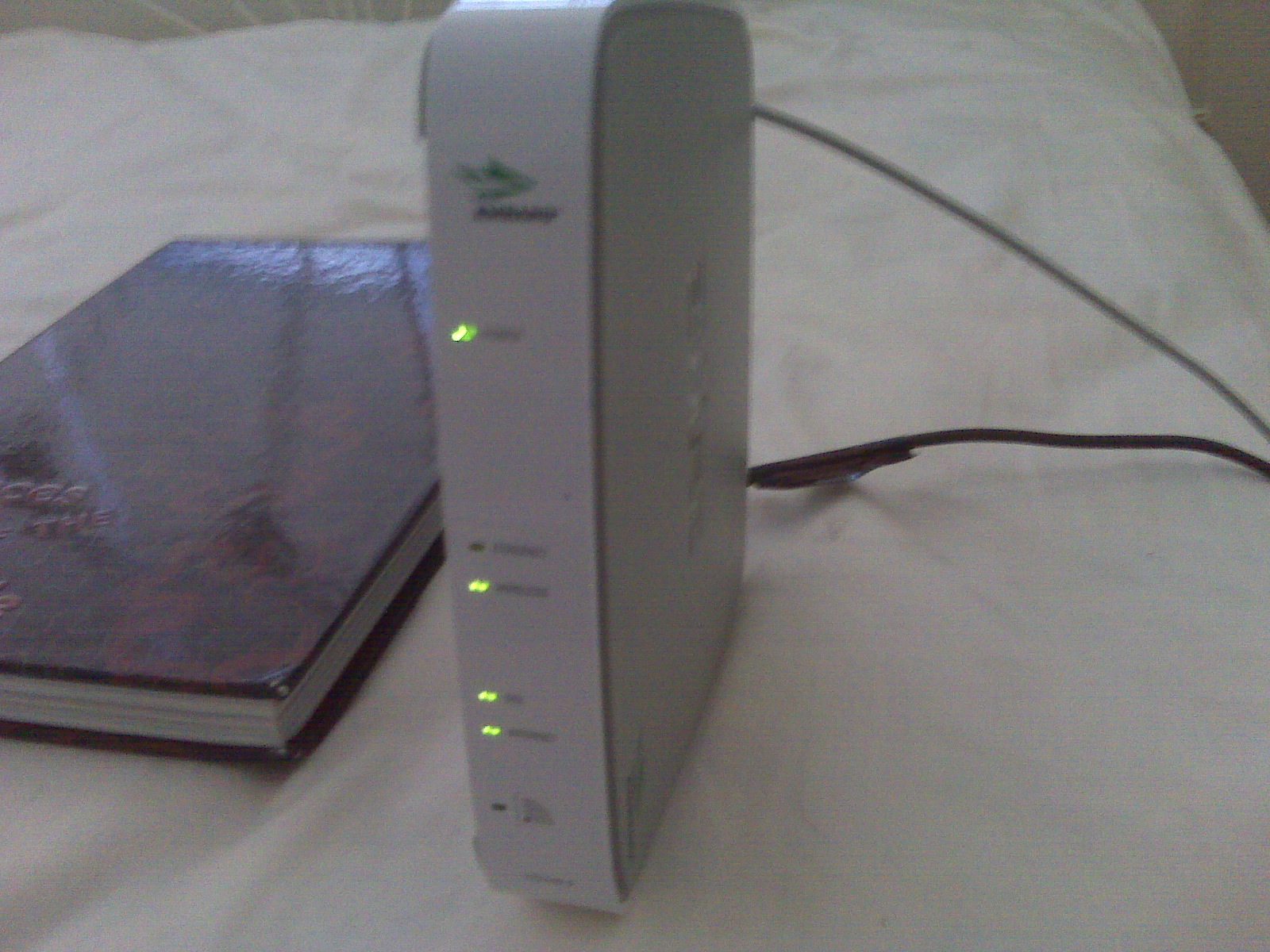
A 2701HG-S wireless gateway by 2Wire, issued by Embarq

Embarq previously worked with NebuAd, a behavioral targeting advertising company to track customers' internet browsing habits. The goal was to deliver relevant ads based on browsing history. This has raised several legal and privacy concerns, along with the other internet providers using NebuAd and related services such as Charter Communications and WOW!. Embarq's use of NebuAd prompted a letter from Congressman Edward Markey. Embarq responded to Congressman Markey's letter. Embarq later claimed that its participation with NebuAd was a trial, and that they were not currently using NebuAd for behavioral targeted advertising.
