= Brightspeed =

American telecommunications company

- Trade name: Connect Holdings LLC
- Type: Private
- Industry: Telecommunications
- Founded: 2022
- Headquarters: Charlotte, North Carolina
- Key people: Tom Maguire; Michel Combes
- Owner: Apollo Global Management
- Website: https://www.brightspeed.com/

Connect Holdings LLC, doing business as Brightspeed, is a telecommunications and Internet service provider in the United States. It is owned by Apollo Global Management. The company was formed in 2022 to acquire operations in 20 states which were previously owned by Lumen Technologies.

== History ==
Lumen Technologies announced a plan to divest itself of local phone operations in twenty states in the Midwest, Southeast, and Mid-Atlantic regions of the U.S. in order to concentrate on their large enterprise data business inherited from their acquisition of Level 3 Communications, and to build out optical fiber in 16 western states where they continue to operate local phone operations under the CenturyLink brand, including exchanges inherited from Qwest, a Baby Bell, along with their operations in Nevada and Florida. Apollo Global Management, an asset management firm, acquired the divested operations for $7.5 billion plus the assumption of $1.4 billion in debt through the newly formed subsidiary Connect Holding, which later announced the trade name Brightspeed. The purchase closed on October 3, 2022.

The assets sold include numerous incumbent local exchange carriers (ILECs) which once belonged to Embarq, to which Sprint Nextel had spun off its local telephone operations in 2006. Those ILECs also included former Centel subsidiaries, which Sprint had acquired in 1993. Others had belonged to Lumen predecessor CenturyTel prior to its 2008 merger with Embarq.

Founding chief executive Tom Maguire retired in June 2025 and was succeeded by Michel Combes, who also serves as executive chairman. The company is headquartered in Charlotte, North Carolina.

== Service area ==
The company operates in portions of these states:

- Alabama
- Arkansas
- Georgia
- Illinois
- Indiana
- Kansas
- Louisiana
- Michigan
- Mississippi
- Missouri
- New Jersey
- North Carolina
- Ohio
- Oklahoma
- Pennsylvania
- South Carolina
- Tennessee
- Texas
- Virginia
- Wisconsin

Most of the telephone exchanges acquired by Brightspeed are in less dense rural areas away from major cities in these states, which are predominantly served depending on the state by either AT&T or Verizon.
