= List of Lumen Technologies operating companies =

The Lumen Technologies operating companies are local exchange carriers owned by Lumen Technologies, the third largest landline telephone company in the United States.

Lumen Technologies operating companies consist of operations inherited from various predecessor companies, which is reflected in the differing names of the companies and partially overlapping service territories; all operating companies do business using the CenturyLink brand. Predecessors include:

- CenturyTel - the former corporate name of CenturyLink.
- Embarq, the former landline operations of Sprint Nextel, which were spun off in 2006; these include operations dating from Sprint's time as United Telecommunications and operations owned by Centel, which it acquired in 1993.
- Qwest Communications International - which, through its acquisition of US West, inherited operations of the former Bell System in numerous western states.

== List ==
=== CenturyTel companies ===
CenturyLink grew as Century Telephone (later CenturyTel) through acquiring many small and mid-size telephone companies. These include:

- CenturyTel of Chester, Inc. (Iowa, Minnesota)
- CenturyTel of Colorado, Inc. – formerly Universal Telephone
- CenturyTel of Eagle, Inc. (Colorado) – formerly owned by Pacific Telecom
- CenturyTel of the Northwest, Inc. (Montana, Oregon, Washington) – formerly Pacific Telecom
- CenturyTel of the Gem State, Inc. (Idaho, Nevada) – formerly owned by Pacific Telecom
- CenturyTel of the Southwest, Inc. – (New Mexico)
- Telephone USA of Wisconsin

=== Former Embarq companies ===
The following companies were acquired from Embarq, which was formed in 2006 by the spin-off of the local telephone operations of Sprint Corporation (previously named United Telephone). It also includes companies formerly owned by Centel which was purchased by Sprint in 1993.

- CenturyLink of Florida, Inc.
- CenturyLink of Minnesota, Inc.
- CenturyLink of Nevada, Inc.
- United Telephone Company of the West – (Nebraska, Wyoming)
- United Telephone of the Northwest – (Oregon, Washington)

=== Former Qwest companies ===
Qwest acquired US West, one of the Baby Bells, in 2000. Qwest was in turn acquired by CenturyLink in 2011.

- Qwest Corporation (Arizona, Colorado, Idaho, Iowa, Minnesota, Montana, Nebraska, New Mexico, North Dakota, Oregon, South Dakota, Texas, Utah, Washington, Wyoming) - Combines the former operations of Mountain Bell, Northwestern Bell, and Pacific Northwestern Bell, and is still regulated as a Bell Operating Company
- El Paso County Telephone Company (El Paso County, Colorado) – Acquired by US West in 1985.
