= Port Alexander, Alaska =

City and port in Southeast Alaska

Port Alexander, Alaska Shee Yat’aḵ.aan
- City
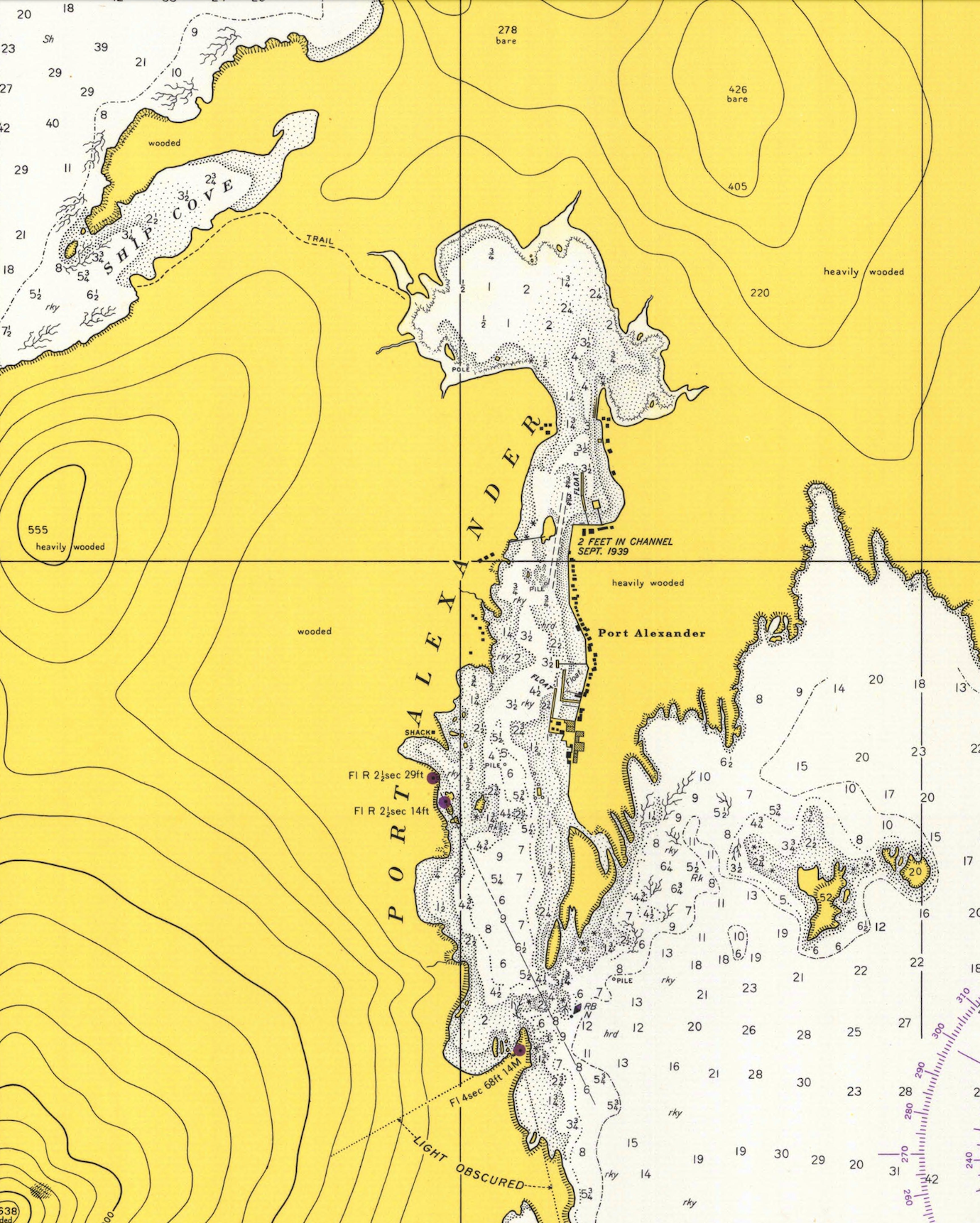
- Chart of Port Alexander

- Location in the United States
- Coordinates: 56°14′24″N 134°39′26″W
- Country: United States
- State: Alaska
- Census Area: Prince of Wales-Hyder
- Incorporated: May 5, 1938

Government
  - Mayor: Corey Gifford
  - State senator: Bert Stedman (R)
  - State rep.: Rebecca Himschoot (I)

Area
  - Total: 15.02 sq mi (38.89 km^{2})
  - Land: 3.50 sq mi (9.07 km^{2})
  - Water: 11.51 sq mi (29.82 km^{2})
- Elevation: 43 ft (13 m)

Population (2020)
  - Total: 78
  - Density: 22/sq mi (8.6/km^{2})
- Time zone: UTC-9 (Alaska (AKST))
  - Summer (DST): UTC-8 (AKDT)
- ZIP code: 99836
- Area code: 907
- FIPS code: 02-62510
- GNIS feature ID: 1424551

Port Alexander (Lingít: Shee Yat’aḵ.aan) is a city and harbor at the southeastern corner of Baranof Island, Alaska. As of the 2020 census the population was 78, up from 52 in 2010. In the early part of the twentieth century it was one of the most important fishing ports in Alaska, supporting hundreds of small trolling boats. By one estimate, these boats caught in excess of 5 million pounds of salmon per year in the 1920s.

== History ==
=== Before the fishing boom (Pre-1913) ===
There is no written record of a permanent Tlingit settlement at Port Alexander. One translation of its Tlingit name, Haa Léelk'w Hás Aaní Saax'ú, is "Village beside Shee [Baranof Island]" which hints that it was some sort of dwelling place. The fact that there were native structures there in 1794 suggests that the Tlingit used the area in the pre-contact era in some capacity, perhaps as a summer fish camp.

George Vancouver anchored HMS Discovery and HMS Chatham in or near Ship Cove, a small bay on the southeast shore of Port Conclusion, on August 1, 1794. He sent two survey parties to explore northward in open boats while repairs were made on his ships. Ship Cove is only 1/4 mile from the inner harbor, also known as the back lagoon, of Port Alexander across a narrow neck of land. He wrote that "some of our gentlemen, who had made some excursions about the neighborhood" described reaching the site of Port Alexander. Vancouver made it clear that he did not see the site himself. He wrote:

The head of this cove [Ship Cove] approaches within the fourth of a mile of the head of another cove [Port Alexander], whose entrance on the outside [Chatham Strait] is about 2 miles to the south of the south point of this harbor [Port Conclusion]. In the entrance of that cove [Port Alexander] the depth is 7 fathoms, weeds were seen growing across it, and to the north of it is a small inlet with some rocks. The surrounding shores are generally steep and rocky, and were covered with wood nearly to the water's edge, but on the sides of the adjacent hills were some spots clear of trees, and chiefly occupied by a damp moist moorish soil, in which were several pools of water. The surface produced some berry bushes, but the fruit at this season of the year was not ripe....In the above cove [Port Alexander] on the west side were found a few deserted Indian habitations, which were the only ones that had been met with."

Vancouver's 1798 chart of southern Baranof Island shows the outline of Port Alexander.

Mikhail Dmitriyevich Tebenkov was the director of the Russian-American Company and governor of Russian America from 1845 to 1850. He was an officer in the Imperial Russian Navy and an expert surveyor and hydrographer. He produced one of the first detailed charts of Baranof Island. He is credited by one source with naming Port Alexander, speculating that he commemorated Alexander Baranof, the first governor of Russian Alaska. Tebenkov's 1849 map shows the outline of Port Alexander, but does not label it as such.

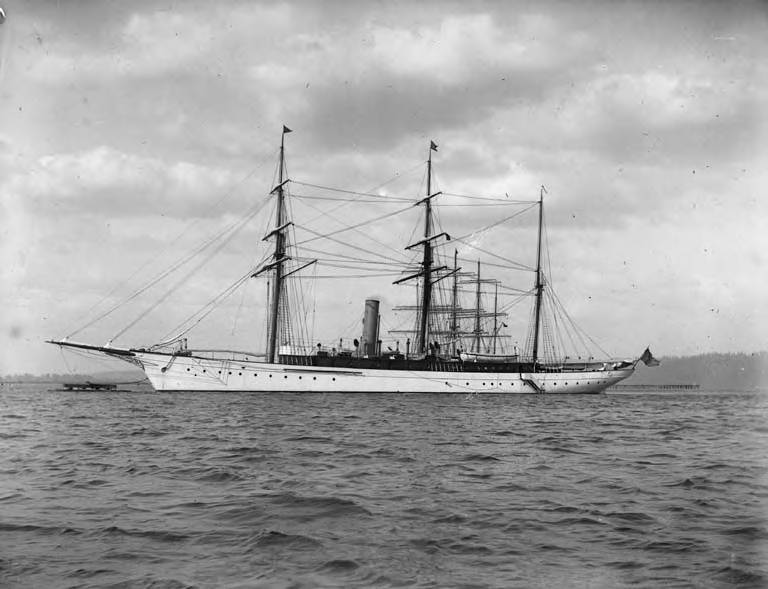
The steam yacht Eleanor visited Port Alexander in 1895

Port Alexander was visited occasionally by yachts, commercial vessels, and fishing boats in the late nineteenth and early twentieth centuries. In 1895 the 240-foot yacht Eleanor, owned by William A. Slater, stopped during an Alaskan cruise. In June 1898 Moran Brothers assembled a fleet of twelve paddlewheel steamers in Puget Sound. They sailed for St. Michael Alaska, to serve the Klondike gold rush trade on the Yukon River. The ships encountered a storm in which nine ships were reported damaged. The fleet put in to Port Alexander to make repairs on June 7 and sailed out on June 9, 1898. In January 1902 the tug Pilot and her tow anchored at Port Alexander to wait out a storm. During another storm in October 1905, the 223-foot steamship Santa Clara also used Port Alexander for refuge. Notwithstanding this history, the 1901 U.S. Coast Pilot reported that Port Alexander could "only be used by very small vessels and has an uninviting appearance."

=== Fishing boom (1913-1941) ===
Fishermen found Port Alexander advantageous. Salmon schooled in the ocean waters near Cape Ommaney prior to returning to their natal streams to spawn. At some times, this allowed for better fishing than in inside waters. The Bureau of Fisheries reported that 1913 was the first year of large scale fishing at Port Alexander. One estimate of the fishing fleet that year was 300 power boats, and 400 hand-trolling boats. In 1924, one official estimated that fishermen at Port Alexander would receive about $400,000 ($7.51 million in 2025) for their catch that summer. By 1925 the fleet was between 500 and 600 gas-powered boats.

The hundreds of boats brought more hundreds of fisherman to Port Alexander. The U.S. Forest Service estimated that the summer population was between 1,000 and 1,200. The fishermen needed food, fuel, and supplies whenever they were in town. When the fishing was good, they had money in their pockets to spend in bars, pool halls, and brothels. During Prohibition there were illegal stills in the back lagoon, and alcohol was smuggled in from Prince Rupert, British Columbia. In July 1923, four men were arrested for violations of the Alaskan Bone Dry Law, and 1,500 bottles of beer were seized at Port Alexander. A 1929 raid by Federal officers arrested seven men for prohibition violations. With the end of prohibition, legal bars opened in town. A dance hall and "beer parlor" was built in 1935.

While much of the activity at Port Alexander was seasonal, a permanent community grew up around the needs of the fishing fleet. There were several bakeries, one as early as 1916. A U. S. post office was opened in 1926. In 1928, the town included a church, six general stores, six restaurants, three bakeries, a butcher shop, two barber shops, and three pool rooms. A Petersburg dairy shipped 90 gallons of milk to Port Alexander on every mail boat. Both Standard Oil and Union Oil ran fuel depots. Elections were held. Dances were organized and movies were shown. The Harborview Hotel welcomed visitors. In May 1928, the Commerce Department granted Karl Hansen a license for a wireless telegraphy station, which connected Port Alexander to the outside for the first time.

Many of the fishermen in Port Alexander, such as Karl Hansen, were immigrants from Norway. In 1927 the Norwegian Federation of Young People's Societies received a special use permit to build a seaman's home for fishermen in need. In June 1927, two Lutheran priests were dispatched from Minnesota to oversee the construction of the building. The mission in Port Alexander, operated under the name "Fredheim" (which translates from Norwegian roughly as "peace home") was still being supported by the organization in 1955.

A foot trail between the back lagoon and Ship Cove was built by the U.S. Forest Service in 1925 and improved by the Civilian Conservation Corps in 1938. While Vancouver's report makes no mention of how his "gentlemen" came to know that Ship Cove was a quarter-mile from the Back Lagoon, the fact that they did know this distance suggests that they may have traversed a similar path. This trail benefited from significant maintenance in 1949 and periodically through the decades. It is still in use today.

In response to the large fishing fleet, the U.S. Lighthouse Service erected a fixed white light on a post at the southern entrance to Port Alexander on May 31, 1920. This was upgraded to a flashing light in 1922. On July 3, 1930, Congress authorized funding for the Army Corps of Engineers to dredge a channel 150 feet (46 m) wide to a depth of 15 feet (4.6 m) below mean lower low water from Chatham Strait into Port Alexander, and an inner channel 40 feet (12 m) wide to a depth of 2 feet (0.61 m) below mean lower low water into the back lagoon. The contract for the dredging was awarded to Keeney and Semple of Juneau who bid $18,900 for the job. The work was completed in 1931 by the Puget Sound Bridge and Dredging Company's dredge Everett. A 1945 authorization to deepen the inner channel was cancelled due to the reduction in use of the harbor associated with reduced fishing.

==== Seafood processing in Port Alexander ====
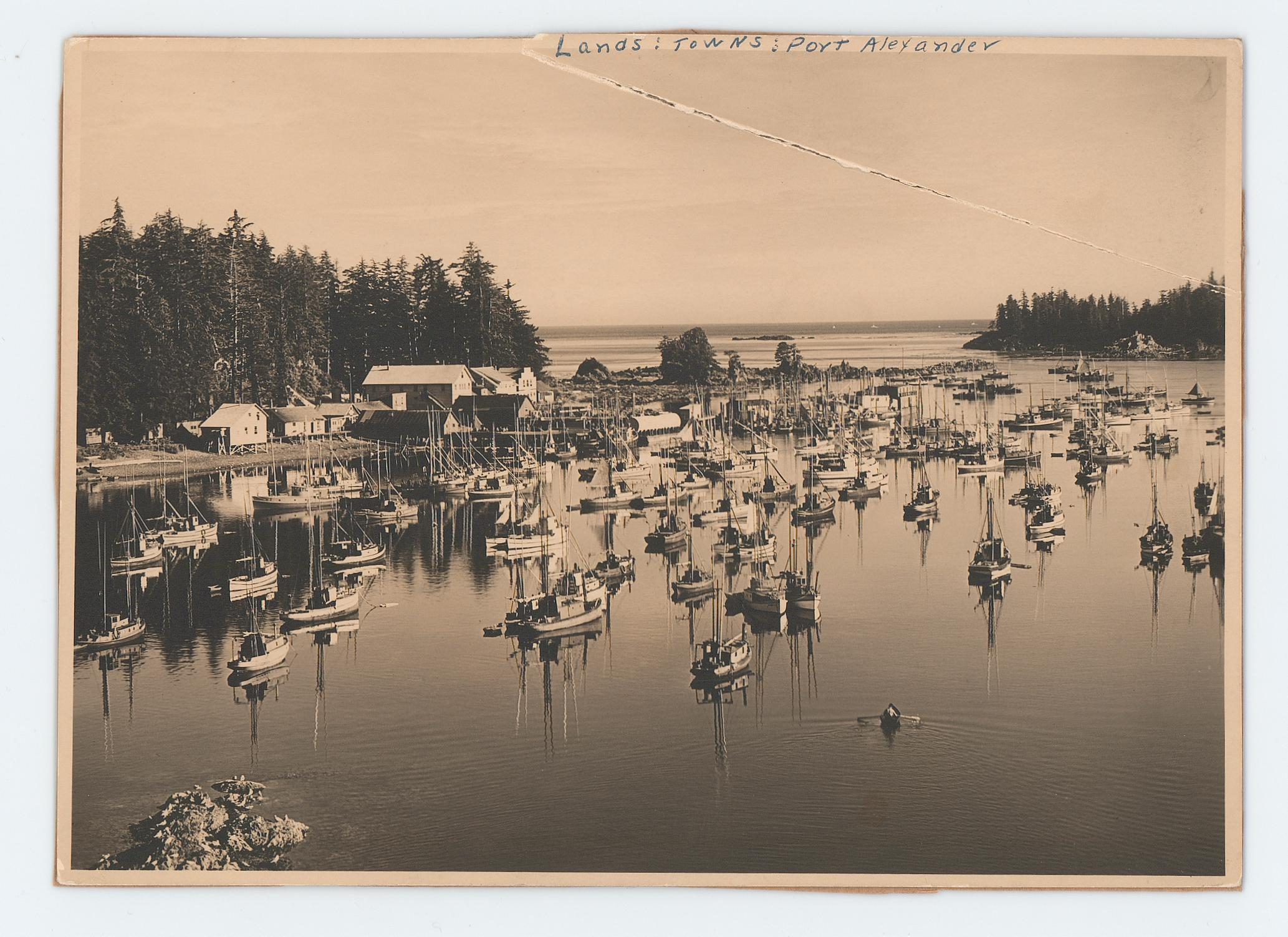
Port Alexander c.1920 with the fishing fleet

There was no refrigeration on the small fishing boats at Port Alexander, so when trollers returned to port they needed to sell their catch before it spoiled. Some of the fish were bought to be taken to canneries and salteries elsewhere. This practice lasted for a century. The Columbia & Northern Fishing & Packing Company had a floating buying station at Port Alexander in 1913 which transported salmon to the company's plant at Wrangell. The New England Fish Company bought salmon in the harbor in 1930. In July 1938 the Union Trading and Packing Company's tender Magnolia landed 24,000 pounds (11,000 kg) of Port Alexander salmon at Petersburg for processing. As late as 1996, Sitka Sound Seafoods maintained a floating buying station at Port Alexander aboard the Alaska Queen. Between 2000 and 2010 the number of fish buyers in Port Alexander varied between one and three.

Some of the fish caught by the trolling fleet were processed in small plants at Port Alexander. Martin B. Dahl was a pioneer. He began mild curing salmon on a floating plant in the harbor in 1913. In late 1915 Dahl organized a new company to carry on his business. He became general manager of the Northland Trading & Packing Company. His new company built a shore station to process fish in 1916. He sold Northland Trading & Packing to Southern Alaska Canning Company in 1918, but continued his fishing business at Port Alexander in 1919 as M. B. Dahl & Co.

Karl Hansen took up where Dahl stopped. He ran the Pacific Mild Cure Company's floating processor Volante at Little Port Walter, and in 1920 moved to Port Alexander and started his own operation based on his boat Leif II. He operated a mild curing plant at Port Alexander until 1943, starting afloat and moving to a shore station in 1923. He also owned a general store at Port Alexander selling supplies to residents and fishermen.

Conflicts over pricing between fishermen and buyers at Port Alexander were frequent. For example, in July 1919, fisherman refused to sell to Pacific Mild Cure Company for two weeks. In response, Alaska Union Fisheries, Inc., was incorporated in 1919 by the Alaska Labor Union to create a cooperative for fishermen that would buy and process their fish. In 1920 it used the barge Vashon II to mild cure salmon at Port Alexander.

Trollers at Port Alexander struck for three weeks in 1927, costing an estimated $200,000. In June 1928 the fishermen at Port Alexander, led by the Alaska Trollers Association, went on strike again for higher prices. Buyers had dropped the price they paid for king salmon from 18 cents a pound for large fish, 8 cents a pound for small fish, and 5 cents a pound for white king salmon, to 15, 8, and 5 cents. The strike lasted seven weeks. The fishermen struck again in 1931 over a drop in prices, with Karl Hansen one of the few buyers in Southeast Alaska who held his prices steady. A troller strike in 1933 was also settled with Hansen agreeing prices with the Trollers Association.

Most of Port Alexander's catch was processed in Alaska and shipped south to Vancouver and Seattle, from whence it was distributed globally. When the Grand Trunk Pacific Railway reached Prince Rupert in 1914, fishermen and processors had an alternate route to bring their fish to market. Rather than striking for higher fish prices, some fishermen dealt with low prices in Alaska by selling their fish at Prince Rupert. In some years this drove price competition between the two markets.

Seafood processing at Port Alexander
	Mild cure salmon (tierces)	Pickled herring (barrels)	Salted salmon (barrels)	Company	Notes
1913	yes			M. B. Dahl	
1916	yes			Northland Trading & Packing	Run by M. B. Dahl
1917	yes			Northland Trading & Packing	Run by M. B. Dahl
1917	yes			Pacific Mild Cure Co.	
1918		620		M. B. Dahl & Co.	
1918	306			Pacific Mildcure Co.	
1919	300			M. B. Dahl & Co.	
1919	65			Patton & Hibbs	Sold the floating curing scow in 1921
1920	341			Karl Hansen	
1920	yes			Alaska Union Fisheries, Inc.	
1921	512			Karl Hansen	
1921	647		127	Alaska Union Fisheries, Inc.	
1922	380			Karl Hansen	
1922	358			Alaska Union Fisheries, Inc.	
1923	576			Karl Hansen	
1924	912			Karl Hansen	
1925	602			Karl Hansen	
1926	631			Karl Hansen	
1926	Yes			Union Trading & Packing Co.	
1927	990			Karl Hansen	
1928	Yes			Baranof Mild Cure Co.	Floating processor B. M. Co. No.1
1928	549			Karl Hansen	
1929	Yes			Baranof Mild Cure Co.	Floating processor B. M. Co. No. 1
1930	Yes			Baranof Mild Cure Co.	Last year at Port Alexander
1941	408			Karl Hansen	
1942	356			Karl Hansen	
1943	43			Karl Hansen	
1944	59			Karl Hansen	Last year at Port Alexander

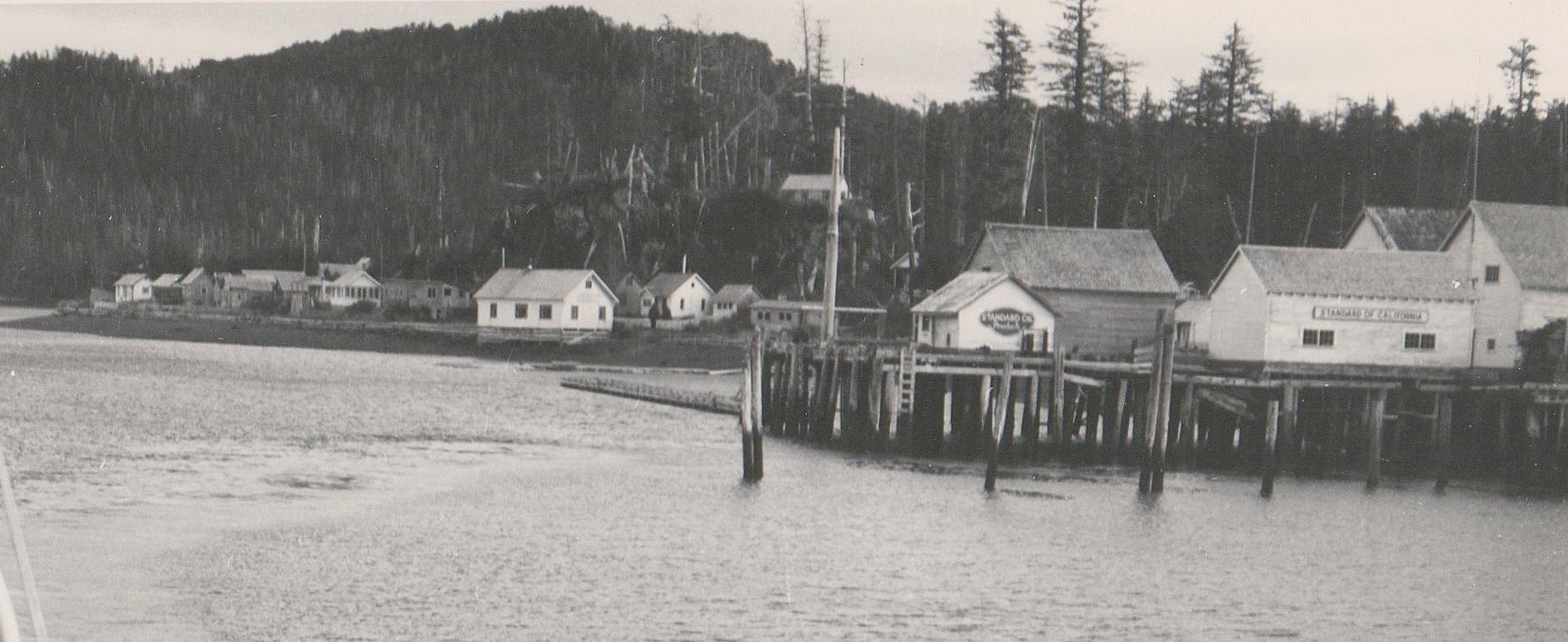
Port Alexander in 1950, with the Standard Oil fuel dock on the right. Fredheim, the Norwegian fishermen's home, is the white building to the left of the dock.

=== Lean years 1942–1970 ===
Fish stocks in the area began declining in 1938. No definitive cause was determined for the decline, but speculation focused on overfishing, both of salmon and the herring they fed on. Port Alexander's mild cure salmon had a significant market in Germany which disappeared at the advent of World War II. The war pulled many of the men who might have been fishing into the armed services or to civilian construction projects. Taken together, these issues caused the local economy to contract. Karl Hansen's former general store burned in August 1949. By 1955, Port Alexander was referred to as a "ghost settlement." The school closed and Dick Gorr's store was the only business in town by 1971.

The town also suffered from some unusually heavy storms during this period. In November 1948 a storm washed away one on the Union Oil docks, the meat market, 200 feet (61 m) of sidewalk, and 125 feet (38 m) of seawall, among other damage.

In 1958 the Territorial Department of Aviation funded a seaplane float and ramp at Port Alexander. In 1962 a new public float was built by the State of Alaska.

=== Regrowth 1970–present ===
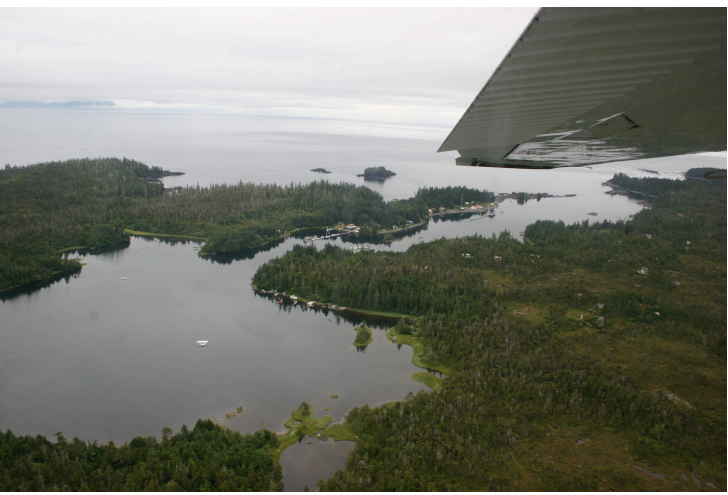
Aerial image of Port Alexander, Alaska

In 1971, the Bureau of Land Management, which owned the Federal property within the townsite, sold its entire portfolio of 44 building lots at auction, some at above their appraised value.

Dick Gorr began building a cold storage facility at Port Alexander as early as 1970, with a potable water pipeline to make ice. In 1978 Pelican Cold Storage Company, doing business as Port Alexander Cold Storage Company, assumed the management of R. H. Gorr Fish Buying and Supply at Port Alexander. The business bought fish and supplied the fishing fleet with groceries and other needs. By 1983 the business was closed and offered for sale. Pelican Cold Storage still owned the buildings when they burned on January 21, 1990. Telephone service in the town provided by Alascom and Telephone Utilities of the Northland was knocked out for several days when equipment in one of the buildings melted.

In 1986 the Sitka Summer Music Festival presented a concert at Port Alexander.

KCAW, a non-commercial radio station in Sitka, began rebroadcasting its programming on a translator station in Port Alexander on November 1, 1990. It rebroadcasts its programming on K220CH, operating on 91.9 MHz.

A town water system supplies potable water from a 125,000 US gallons (470,000 L) tank installed in 2024.

In July 1976, Alaska Governor Jay Hammond signed an agreement with RCA Alaska Communications to install fifty earth stations in remote communities funded with a $5 million subsidy from the State. One of these was a 15-foot dish at Port Alexander which brought the town two telephone circuits interconnected to the rest of the world. In 1982 Sitka Telephone Company sought permission to establish a local phone company in Port Alexander, which it did. Pacific Telecom, Inc. bought Sitka Telephone Company and another local exchange carrier in 1984 and renamed the merged companies Telephone Utilities of the Northland, Inc. In December 1997 Pacific Telecom sold all of its telecommunications operations to Century Telephone Enterprises, Inc. In August 1998, Century announced the sale of the Alaskan operations it had acquired from Pacific Telecom to a private-equity-backed group which ultimately became a public company named Alaska Communications Systems Group, Inc. In 2000 Telephone Utilities of the Northland, Inc. changed its name to ACS of the Northland, Inc. In July 2021, Alaska Communications Systems Group, was sold to ATN International Inc. and a group of private investors, and its stock was delisted. Under this new ownership group, landline telecommunications service in Port Alexander is offered under the brand Alaska Communications Systems.

In 1995 the Port Alexander Historical Society was formed. In 1997 the Society was awarded ownership of the Cape Decision Lighthouse, which became the basis of a separate non-profit corporation to preserve this historic structure. In 2010 the Society opened the Port Alexander Museum to preserve and highlight the history of Port Alexander. The museum building itself is a historic object, as it was once the home of Karl Hansen who played such a prominent role in the community in its early days. In 2023 it was added to the National Register of Historic Places.

== Climate ==
Port Alexander has an oceanic climate (Köppen climate classification: Cfb), with temperatures ranging from cold to mild depending on the season. Precipitation is very heavy for most of the year, with a relative lull during the spring and early summer. Some of the precipitation falls as snow during the winter months.

Climate data for Port Alexander, Alaska (1991–2020 normals, extremes 1949–2017)
Month	Jan	Feb	Mar	Apr	May	Jun	Jul	Aug	Sep	Oct	Nov	Dec	Year
Record high °F (°C)	52 (11)	52 (11)	54 (12)	71 (22)	77 (25)	86 (30)	84 (29)	82 (28)	74 (23)	62 (17)	55 (13)	54 (12)	86 (30)
Mean maximum °F (°C)	47.3 (8.5)	47.3 (8.5)	49.3 (9.6)	59.6 (15.3)	67.2 (19.6)	73.7 (23.2)	74.2 (23.4)	74.0 (23.3)	66.0 (18.9)	56.5 (13.6)	49.9 (9.9)	47.8 (8.8)	77.4 (25.2)
Mean daily maximum °F (°C)	39.7 (4.3)	40.8 (4.9)	43.1 (6.2)	49.7 (9.8)	56.7 (13.7)	61.4 (16.3)	64.3 (17.9)	64.1 (17.8)	58.4 (14.7)	50.9 (10.5)	44.2 (6.8)	40.9 (4.9)	51.2 (10.7)
Daily mean °F (°C)	36.0 (2.2)	36.7 (2.6)	37.9 (3.3)	43.2 (6.2)	49.2 (9.6)	54.1 (12.3)	57.2 (14.0)	57.2 (14.0)	52.6 (11.4)	46.3 (7.9)	40.3 (4.6)	37.2 (2.9)	45.7 (7.6)
Mean daily minimum °F (°C)	32.3 (0.2)	32.5 (0.3)	32.7 (0.4)	36.8 (2.7)	41.7 (5.4)	46.7 (8.2)	50.1 (10.1)	50.2 (10.1)	46.9 (8.3)	41.6 (5.3)	36.3 (2.4)	33.4 (0.8)	40.1 (4.5)
Mean minimum °F (°C)	20.4 (−6.4)	21.2 (−6.0)	24.8 (−4.0)	29.1 (−1.6)	33.9 (1.1)	39.3 (4.1)	43.4 (6.3)	43.0 (6.1)	37.8 (3.2)	31.5 (−0.3)	25.7 (−3.5)	21.7 (−5.7)	13.1 (−10.5)
Record low °F (°C)	−1 (−18)	4 (−16)	7 (−14)	18 (−8)	28 (−2)	33 (1)	35 (2)	37 (3)	31 (−1)	22 (−6)	1 (−17)	0 (−18)	−1 (−18)
Average precipitation inches (mm)	16.25 (413)	11.72 (298)	11.05 (281)	8.64 (219)	7.86 (200)	6.65 (169)	9.03 (229)	13.94 (354)	19.34 (491)	19.85 (504)	18.12 (460)	19.58 (497)	162.03 (4,116)
Average snowfall inches (cm)	12.3 (31)	12.0 (30)	11.9 (30)	1.2 (3.0)	0.1 (0.25)	0.0 (0.0)	0.0 (0.0)	0.0 (0.0)	0.0 (0.0)	0.3 (0.76)	4.1 (10)	14.1 (36)	56.0 (142)
Average precipitation days (≥ 0.01 inch)	23.7	19.4	21.5	19.2	16.6	15.5	16.6	18.5	23.3	25.3	24.1	24.4	248.1
Average snowy days (≥ 0.1 in)	5.7	4.8	4.9	1.2	0.1	0.0	0.0	0.0	0.0	0.2	2.5	4.9	24.3
Source: NOAA (mean maxima/minima 1981–2010)

== Demographics ==
Historical population
Census	Pop.	Note	%±
1930	107		—
1940	87		−18.7%
1950	22		−74.7%
1960	18		−18.2%
1970	36		100.0%
1980	86		138.9%
1990	119		38.4%
2000	81		−31.9%
2010	52		−35.8%
2020	78		50.0%
U.S. Decennial Census

Port Alexander first reported on the 1930 U.S. Census as an unincorporated village. It is currently part of the Prince of Wales-Hyder Census Area.

=== 2020 census ===
As of the 2020 census, Port Alexander had a population of 78. The median age was 37.5 years. 30.8% of residents were under the age of 18 and 16.7% of residents were 65 years of age or older. For every 100 females there were 116.7 males, and for every 100 females age 18 and over there were 134.8 males age 18 and over.

0.0% of residents lived in urban areas, while 100.0% lived in rural areas.

There were 30 households in Port Alexander, of which 40.0% had children under the age of 18 living in them. Of all households, 56.7% were married-couple households, 33.3% were households with a male householder and no spouse or partner present, and 3.3% were households with a female householder and no spouse or partner present. About 26.7% of all households were made up of individuals and 10.0% had someone living alone who was 65 years of age or older.

There were 79 housing units, of which 62.0% were vacant. The homeowner vacancy rate was 0.0% and the rental vacancy rate was 25.0%.

Racial composition as of the 2020 census
Race	Number	Percent
White	71	91.0%
Black or African American	0	0.0%
American Indian and Alaska Native	1	1.3%
Asian	0	0.0%
Native Hawaiian and Other Pacific Islander	0	0.0%
Some other race	3	3.8%
Two or more races	3	3.8%
Hispanic or Latino (of any race)	1	1.3%

=== 2000 census ===
As of the 2000 census, there were 81 people, 34 households, and 19 families residing in the city. The population density was 21.5 inhabitants per square mile (8.3/km^{2}). There were 79 housing units at an average density of 20.9 units per square mile (8.1 units/km^{2}). The racial makeup of the city was 83.95% White, 4.94% Native American, and 11.11% from two or more races. 4.94% of the population were Hispanic or Latino of any race.

There were 34 households, out of which 29.4% had children under the age of 18 living with them, 58.8% were married couples living together, and 41.2% were non-families. 38.2% of all households were made up of individuals, and 5.9% had someone living alone who was 65 years of age or older. The average household size was 2.38 and the average family size was 3.30.

In the city, the age distribution of the population shows 30.9% under the age of 18, 3.7% from 18 to 24, 29.6% from 25 to 44, 33.3% from 45 to 64, and 2.5% who were 65 years of age or older. The median age was 38 years. For every 100 females, there were 113.2 males. For every 100 females age 18 and over, there were 115.4 males.

The median income for a household in the city was $31,563, and the median income for a family was $31,875. Males had a median income of $51,250 versus $41,250 for females. The per capita income for the city was $14,767. There were 25.0% of families and 22.9% of the population living below the poverty line, including 18.5% of under eighteens and none of those over 64.

== Government ==
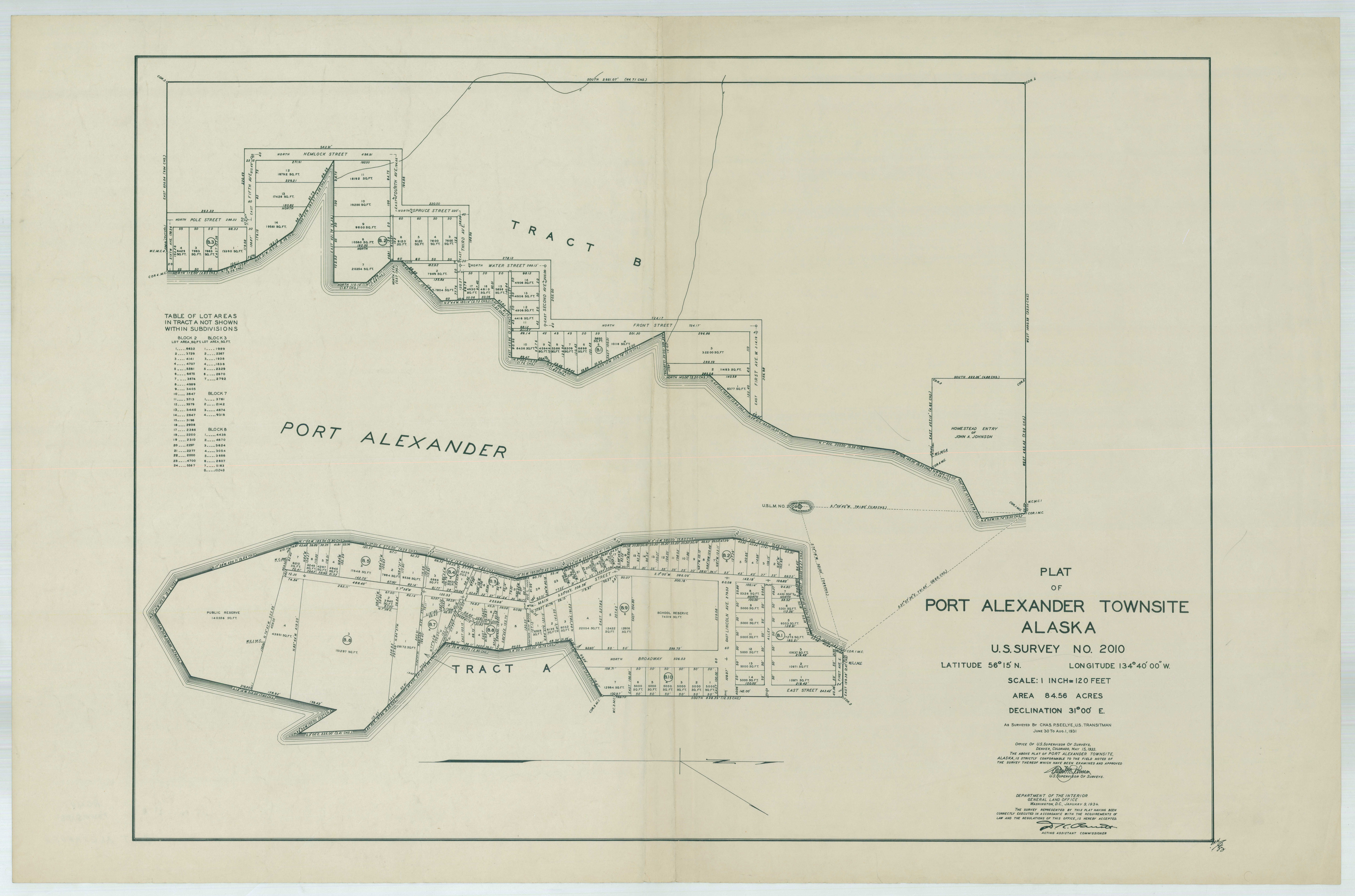
1931 Plat map of Port Alexander

On February 16, 1909, Theodore Roosevelt added most of Baranof Island, including Port Alexander, to the Tongass National Forest by presidential proclamation. The U.S. Forest Service administered the land through a series of special use permits. The first special use permit issued for Port Alexander was to M. B. Dahl's Northland Trading and Packing Company for its shore station in 1916. As the community boomed in the late 1920s, President Calvin Coolidge issued Executive Order 4842 on March 22, 1928, to exclude from Tongass National Forest two tracts across the cove from each other, one of 63.47 acres, and the other of 23.13 acres, for the townsite of Port Alexander. This allowed residents to obtain title to their land rather than renting under a special use permit from the Forest Service. Lots in the new townsite were awarded to current residents, with the remainder sold at auction in 1938.

Port Alexander's citizens voted to incorporate as a city on May 5, 1938. The town became a part of the Greater Sitka Borough in 1963, following the state legislature's passage of the Mandatory Borough Act. The original municipality was dissolved when it unified with Sitka's city and borough governments in 1971, which formed the present-day entity known as the City and Borough of Sitka. However, residents desired to govern themselves and successfully sought to detach themselves from the new municipality. Port Alexander reincorporated as a second class city in 1974. The current city of Port Alexander occupies all land on Baranof Island and its surrounding islets which lies south of 56.27°N and east of 134.6666°W, a total of 3.8 square miles (9.8 km^{2}). Additionally, it administers 11.3 square miles (29 km^{2}) of water, resulting in a total area of 15.1 square miles (39 km^{2}).

In 1929 the territorial government established a public school at Port Alexander. This was closed in 1930 for lack of enrollment, and reopened in 1931. A one-room school building with teachers quarters was built at Port Alexander in 1934. Twenty students enrolled in 1938. The current Port Alexander School is operated by Southeast Island School District.
