= CHI Health Center =

Indoor arena in Omaha, Nebraska, US

CHI Health Center Omaha

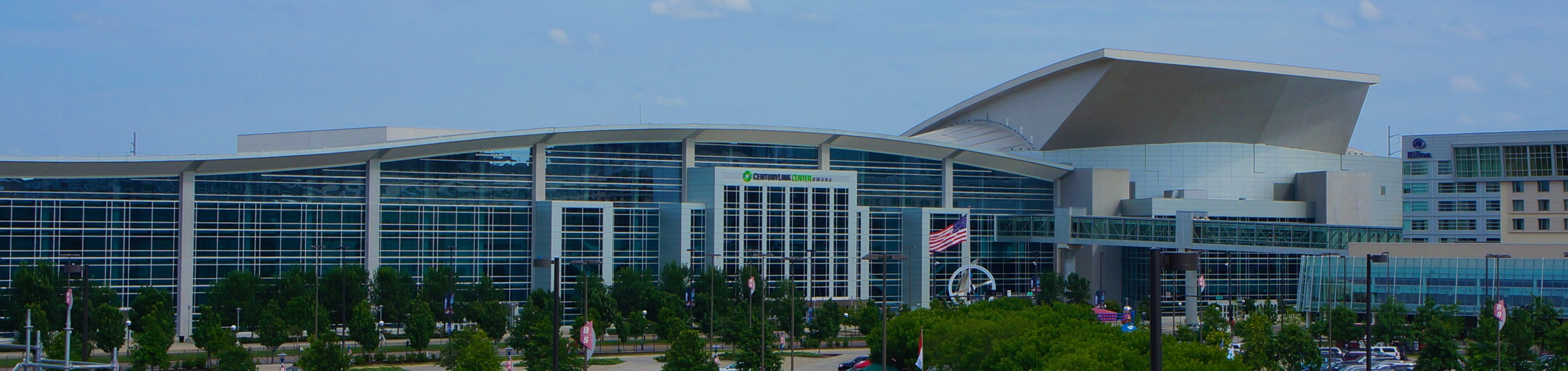
- As CenturyLink Center in 2012
- Former names: Omaha Arena and Convention Center (planning/construction); Qwest Center Omaha (2003–11); CenturyLink Center Omaha (2011–18)

General information
- Location: Downtown Omaha, 455 North 10th Street; Omaha, Nebraska, U.S.
- Coordinates: 41°15′46″N 95°55′41″W
- Named for: CHI Health
- Groundbreaking: March 1, 2001
- Opened: September 20, 2003
- Inaugurated: September 12, 2003
- Cost: $291 million ($509 million in 2025 dollars)
- Owner: City of Omaha

Technical details
- Size: 1,118,300 square feet (103,890 m^{2})

Design and construction
- Architecture firm: DLR Group
- Structural engineer: Thornton-Tomasetti Group
- Services engineer: M–E Engineers, Inc.
- Main contractor: Kiewit Construction Co.

Other information
- Seating capacity: 18,320 (basketball); 17,100 (hockey); 18,975 (concert center-stage); 2,693 (Peter Kiewit Grand Ballroom)
- Parking: 4,500 spaces

Website
- chihealthcenteromaha.com

CHI Health Center Omaha is an arena and convention center in Downtown Omaha, Nebraska, United States. Operated by the Metropolitan Entertainment & Convention Authority (MECA), the 1.1-million-square-foot (100,000 m^{2}) facility has an 18,300-seat arena, a 194,000 sq ft (18,000 m^{2}) exhibition hall, and 62,000 sq ft (5,800 m^{2}) of meeting space. The arena hosts basketball and hockey games, professional wrestling events, concerts, and the annual shareholders' meeting of Omaha-based conglomerate Berkshire Hathaway, usually held on the first Saturday of May.

The complex opened on September 20, 2003, as Qwest Center Omaha, and adopted the name of CenturyLink Center Omaha on July 15, 2011, as part of a $22 billion buyout of Qwest by CenturyLink (formerly CenturyTel). In July 2018, CHI Health bought the naming rights to the arena under a 20-year agreement worth $23.6 million, and the arena was renamed CHI Health Center Omaha effective September 1, that year.

The arena's primary tenant is the Creighton University men's basketball team. Through the 2014–15 NCAA ice hockey season, the Omaha Mavericks men's ice hockey team, representing the University of Nebraska Omaha, was also a primary tenant, but the Mavericks moved to the new Baxter Arena effective with the 2015–16 season. The Major League Volleyball (MLV) team the Omaha Supernovas play their home games at CHI. Just west of the Missouri River, the elevation at street level is approximately 1,000 feet (300 m) above sea level.

== History ==
Talks of a downtown convention center began in 1993 with the, "Nebraskaplex". It would never be built, and instead, the nearby Omaha Civic Auditorium was renovated. In January 1997, then-Omaha mayor Hal Daub announced the Omaha Convention Center at the 1997 State of the City Address. The proposed convention center received criticism due to its price, and many said it would be a loss of the city. Additionally, in 1999, Council Bluffs, Iowa announced that it would be building its own convention center. However, some officials said it would not pose a major threat to the center.

The bond issue to build the Omaha Convention Center-Arena was passed in May 2000. In August 2000, it was announced that the Metropolitan Entertainment and Convention Authority would be turned into a non-profit and would operate the Omaha Convention Center-Arena. Ground was broken on March 1, 2001, with construction starting shortly after. Before opening, Qwest Communications spent $14 million for the naming rights to the center. The Qwest Center officially opened and held its first event on September 20, 2003.

In 2006, the MECA funded a project to expand the arena and add an additional 1,472 seats to the upper bowl. The project also included adding restroom facilities and concession stands, as well as updating aesthetics, mechanical systems, and emergency exits. The cost of the project was $6 million. Construction began in May and was completed September 8, 2006.

In 2009, the center saw another renovation with work enveloping the entire building. The $6 million project included new carpet, wallpaper, reupholstered arena seating, and a new scoreboard.

In 2011, after Qwest's merger with CenturyLink, the center's name was changed to CenturyLink Center Omaha and the signs were replaced. In 2018, CHI Health purchased the naming rights to the center for $23.5 million, renaming it to CHI Health Center. The arena received criticism for the name change, many said the name could cause confusion with a clinic or hospital. Others brought into question how CHI was able to afford the naming rights.

In 2021, the center was used to host the Olympic Swim Trials ahead of the 2020 Summer Olympics. In 2023, it was announced that CHI Health Center would be expanded and renovated due to its smaller size. The bond issue was passed in November 2024. Construction began in early 2025 and will renovate the center and would add an additional 90,000 square feet (8,400 m^{2}) of space.

== Notable events ==
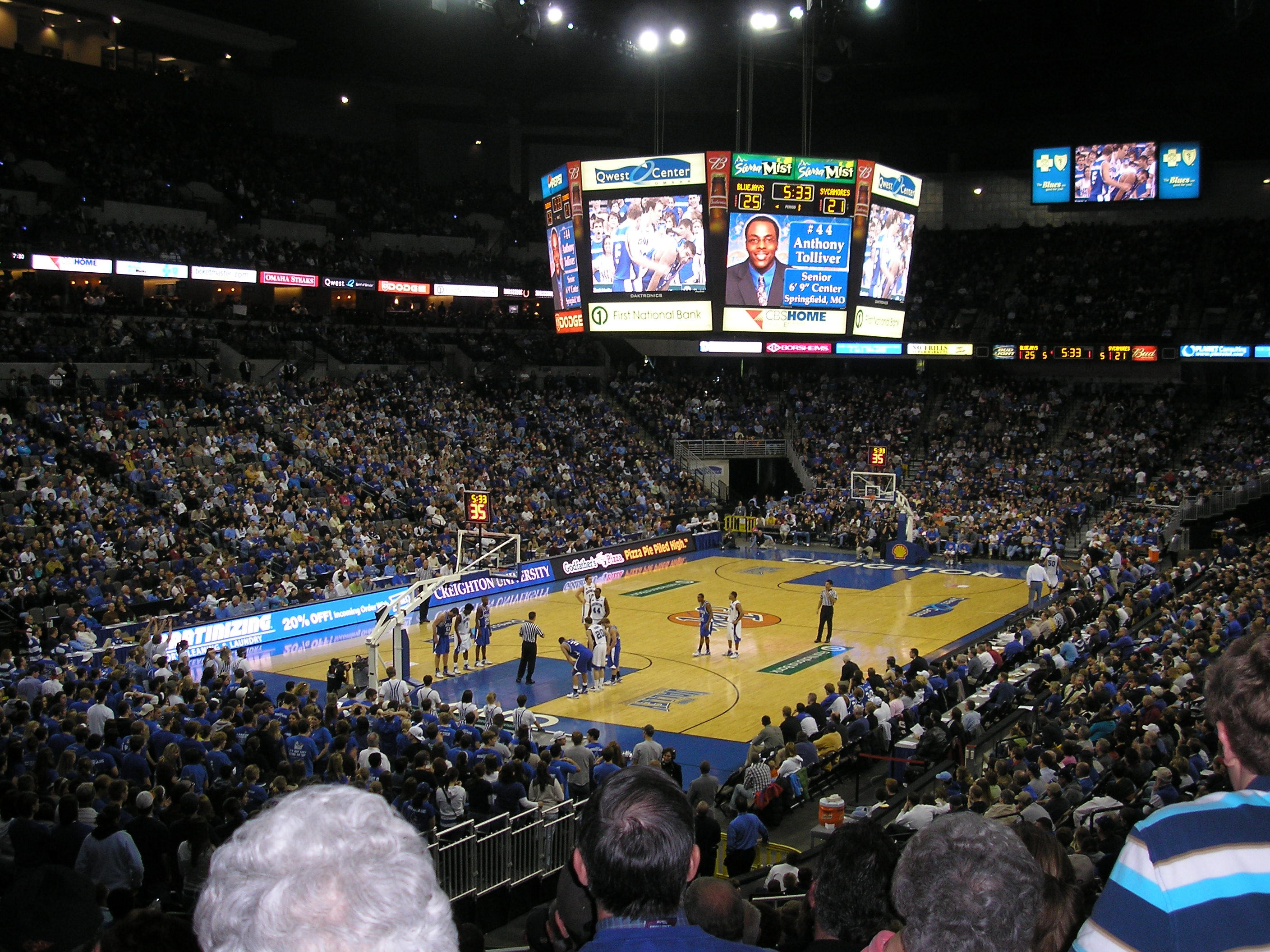
Creighton hosting Indiana State at CHI Health Center in 2007

=== NCAA Events ===
The arena has hosted games in the NCAA Division I men's basketball tournament four times: first- and second-round games in 2008, 2012, 2015, and 2024; and Midwest Regional games (Sweet Sixteen and Elite Eight) in 2018. The arena was planned to host the 2020 tournament's first- and second-round games, but the tournament was cancelled due to the COVID-19 pandemic.

The arena has hosted the NCAA Division I women's volleyball final four in 2006, 2008, 2015, 2020 and 2022. Due to the COVID-19 pandemic in 2020, the arena hosted the entire volleyball tournament that year. Twelve courts were built in the convention center for practices and games. Then, the regional finals, semifinals, and championship were played in the big arena.

The arena also hosted the 2010 NCAA Division I Wrestling Championships.

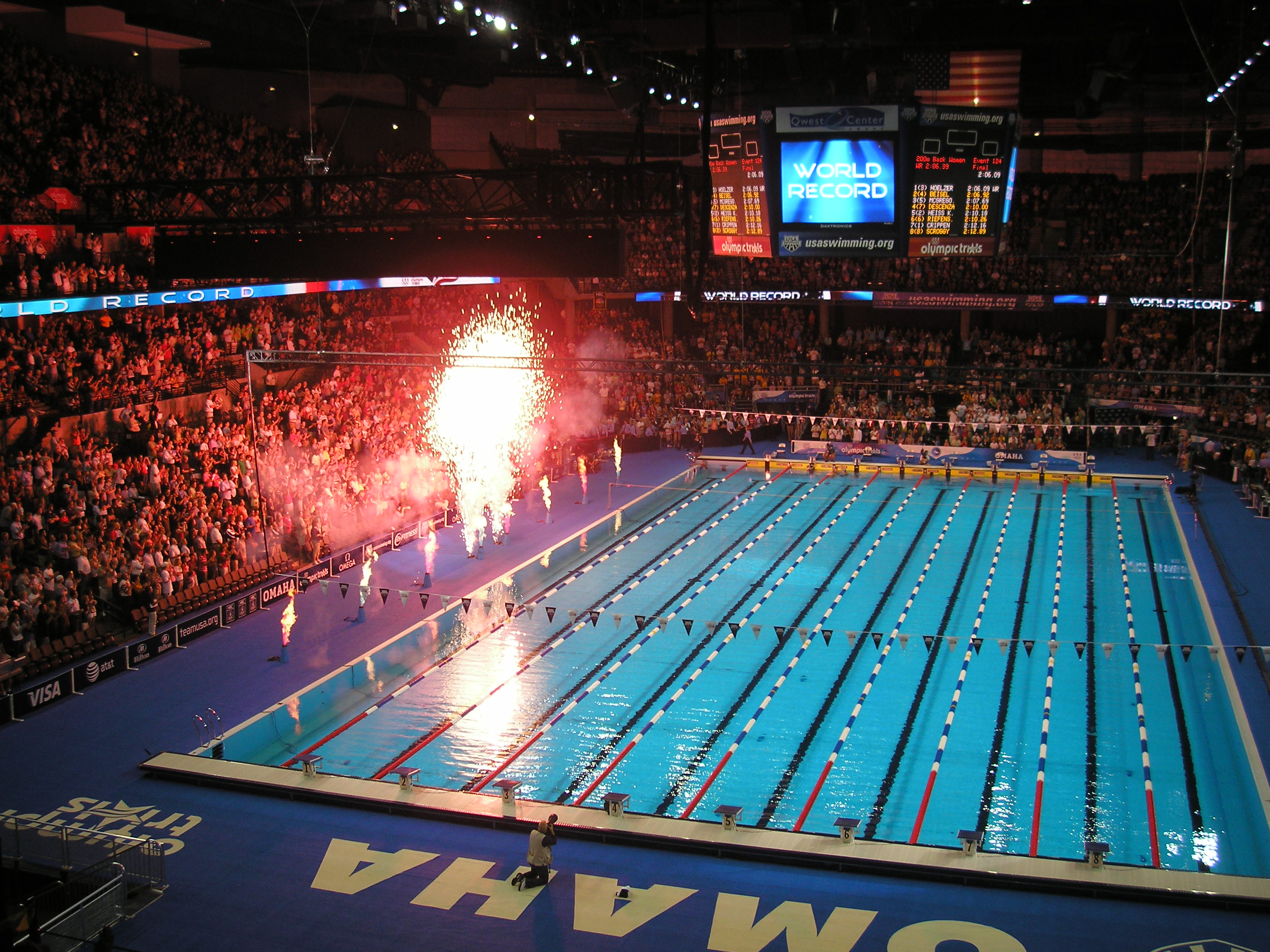
US Olympic Swimming Trials in June 2008

=== Summer Olympics Swimming Trials ===
The center hosted the nationally televised USA Swimming Summer Olympics trials in 2008, 2012, 2016, and 2021. The center does not have permanent swimming facilities and a team of 200 workers with oversight by Myrtha Pools (which specializes in the construction and dismantling of large-scale temporary pools) constructed them in two weeks. The Omaha Fire Department pumped in 2 million U.S. gallons (7,600 cubic meters) of water from hydrants around the center.

The 2008 event averaged more than 12,000 spectators each night.

A storm damaged a portion of the roof known as The Hat on June 27, 2008. There was no structural damage, but the damage caused water to pour into parts of the Qwest Center, flowed down two sets of arena steps and onto the deck of the competition pool for the USA Swimming Summer Olympic Trials. The schedule for the trials went on as planned.

The pools were dismantled after the event and moved to other cities for permanent installation with the 2008 pool going to the Poseidon Swimming facility in Richmond, Virginia, the 2012 pool going to Charles River Aquatics in Boston, Massachusetts, the 2016 pool going to the Hulbert Aquatic Facility in West Fargo, North Dakota (West Fargo bought the pool via a local group of swim enthusiasts called UP Aquatics for $900,000). and the 2021 pool going to a group in Minneapolis, Minnesota that plans to convert an abandoned book bindery in the city's Near North neighborhood into an Olympic-caliber aquatic center.

=== Rodeo ===
From 2006 to 2009, the Professional Bull Riders hosted a Built Ford Tough Series event at the arena, and from 2014 to 2016 they hosted a Velocity Tour event. The PBR returned to host an Unleash the Beast Series event on May 1 and 2, 2021, for their first Premier Series event in 12 years.

=== Other Events ===
The arena home to the WWE Judgment Day 2008 pay-per-view, as well as other events from WWE.

The arena has also hosted six championship boxing cards, all involving Omaha native Terence Crawford as he wanted to defend his titles in front of a home crowd. His first bout at the arena, against Yuriorkis Gamboa for the WBO lightweight belt in 2014, was the first championship fight in Nebraska since the Joe Frazier-Ron Stander bout in 1971.

The arena hosts the Nebraska School Activities Association state wrestling championships each February. The tournament moved to what was then Qwest Center Omaha in 2006 after 30 years at Lincoln's Bob Devaney Sports Center.

In 2016, the arena hosted the Kellogg's Tour of Gymnastics Champions.

== Facilities ==
Tenants
Creighton Bluejays	Big East	2003–present
River City Rodeo and Stock Show	KASB	2003–present
UNO Mavericks	NCHC	2003–2015
Nebraska State Wrestling Tournament	NSAA	2007–present
United States Olympic Trials	USA-S	2008–2021
NCAA Division I men's basketball tournament	NCAA	2008, 2012, 2015, 2018, 2024
NCAA Division I Women's Volleyball Championship	NCAA	2008, 2020, 2022
NCAA Division I Wrestling Championships	NCAA	2010
Omaha Supernovas	PVF	2024–present

CHI Health Omaha Convention Center

The convention center has placed Omaha on the convention map since opening in 2003. The center features three exhibit halls, four ballrooms and over 15 meeting rooms.

- Exhibit Hall: The main exhibition room which can be divided into three separate rooms (Halls A-C) depending on configuration. The combined rooms can house over 1,000 or a conference seating more than 16,000 guests.
- Peter Kiewit Grand Ballroom: Named after the founder of the Kiewit Corporation, is the biggest ballroom in the facility. Based on configuration, it can be divided into 3 small ballrooms (Ballroom A-C) or 2 large rooms (North and South). The room is primarily used for graduation ceremonies, charity galas and business conferences.
- Junior Ballroom: This intimate space was designed for private events such as weddings, receptions, banquets and cocktail parties up to 1,000 guests.

CHI Health Center Arena

The arena is the busiest venue of the complex. Built in 2001, the arena was meant to replace the aging Omaha Civic Auditorium and demolished Ak-Sar-Ben Coliseum. It is the largest arena in the state, seating over 18,000. It contains 32 luxury suites and over a thousand club seats. The arena hosts shows of all genres, including: concerts, family shows, sports, rodeos and circuses. The arena opened September 12, 2003, with a private concert by Grand Funk Railroad. The first official event was the "River City Roundup Fair and Festival", held at both facilities.

Hilton Omaha

This hotel features 600 guest rooms, 15 meeting rooms, and two ballrooms, an on-site restaurant, and skywalk connection to the convention center. The $71 million property opened April 2004 and has achieved the AAA four-diamond rating for ten years.

== Records and milestones ==
Top 10 Largest Home Crowds at CHI Health Center Omaha, Creighton History

Rank	Attendance	Opponent	Result	Date
1	18,964	Providence	W 88–73	March 8, 2014
2	18,859	Georgetown	W 76–63	January 25, 2014
3	18,831	Villanova	L 70–80	December 31, 2016
4	18,797	Villanova	W 101–80	February 16, 2014
5	18,759	Gonzaga	L 92-103	December 1, 2018
6	18,742	Seton Hall	W 72–71	February 23, 2014
7	18,735	Wichita State	L 68–89	February 11, 2012
8	18,650	UConn	L 58-85	January 31, 2026
9	18,613	Wichita State	W 91–79	March 2, 2013
10	18,571	DePaul	W 85-62	January 27, 2024

On the evening of March 8, 2014, the largest crowd to attend a Creighton University basketball game occurred when 18,964 fans witnessed the Creighton men's team defeat Providence on Doug McDermott's career-high senior night performance of 45 points.

On January 13, 2012, the largest crowd to ever watch a hockey game in Nebraska occurred when 16,138 fans attended the game between the University of Nebraska at Omaha and Minnesota-Duluth.

CHI Health Center holds several NCAA attendance records, particularly in women's college volleyball. The three largest crowds to attend NCAA tournament matches were for Nebraska Cornhuskers games at the venue. The highest attendance for any volleyball match in the United States, whether for men or women, occurred on December 19, 2015, when 17,561 fans watched the 2015 NCAA Division I Women's Volleyball Championship game between Nebraska and former conference rival Texas. This broke a record set two days earlier, when Nebraska defeated another former conference rival, Kansas, in the national semifinals in front of a crowd of 17,551. In turn, this match broke an attendance record set in 2008, when 17,340 fans watched the NCAA semifinal match between Penn State and Nebraska.

== Gallery ==
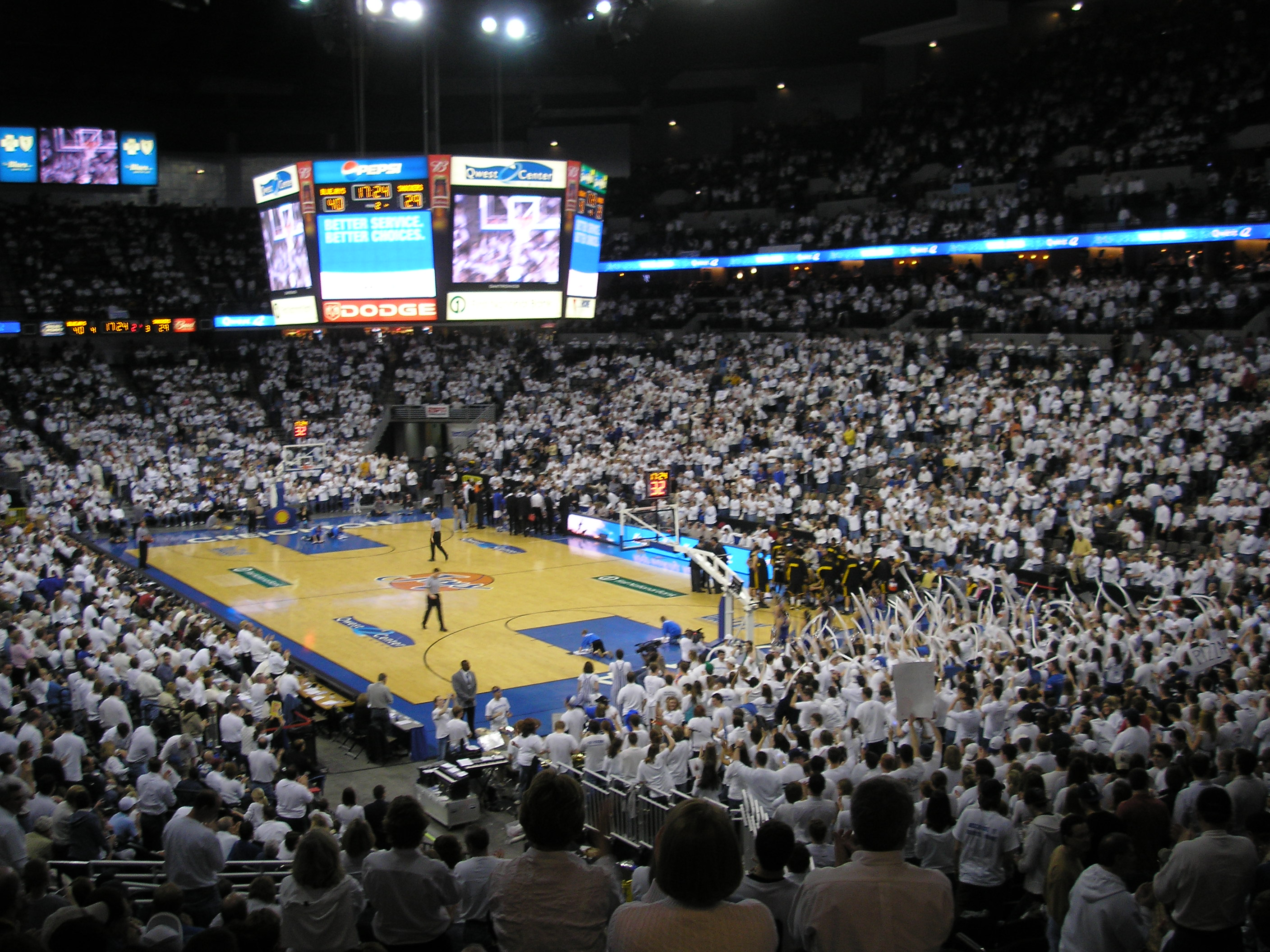
Creighton vs Wichita State, 2007

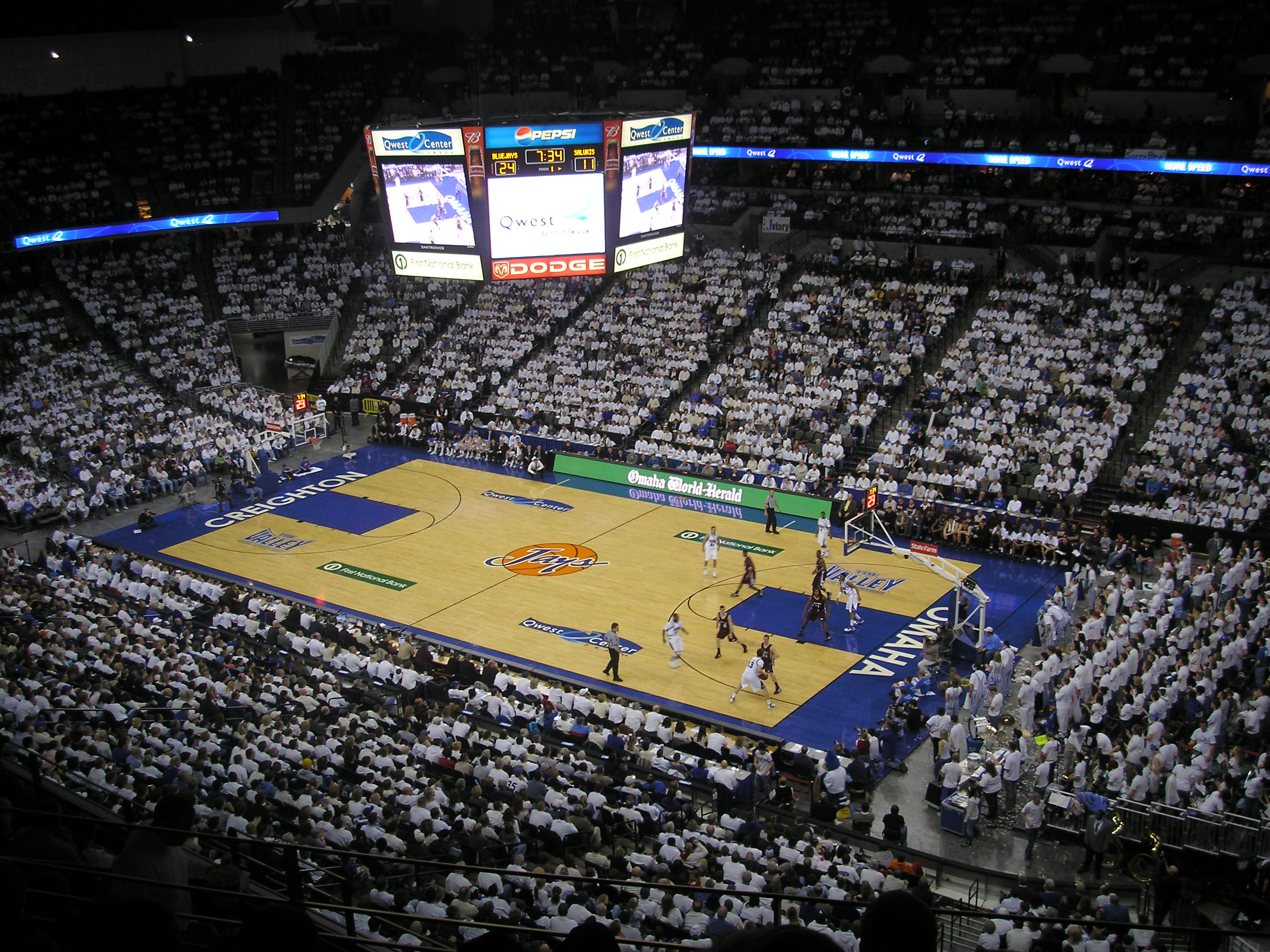
White Out vs Southern Illinois

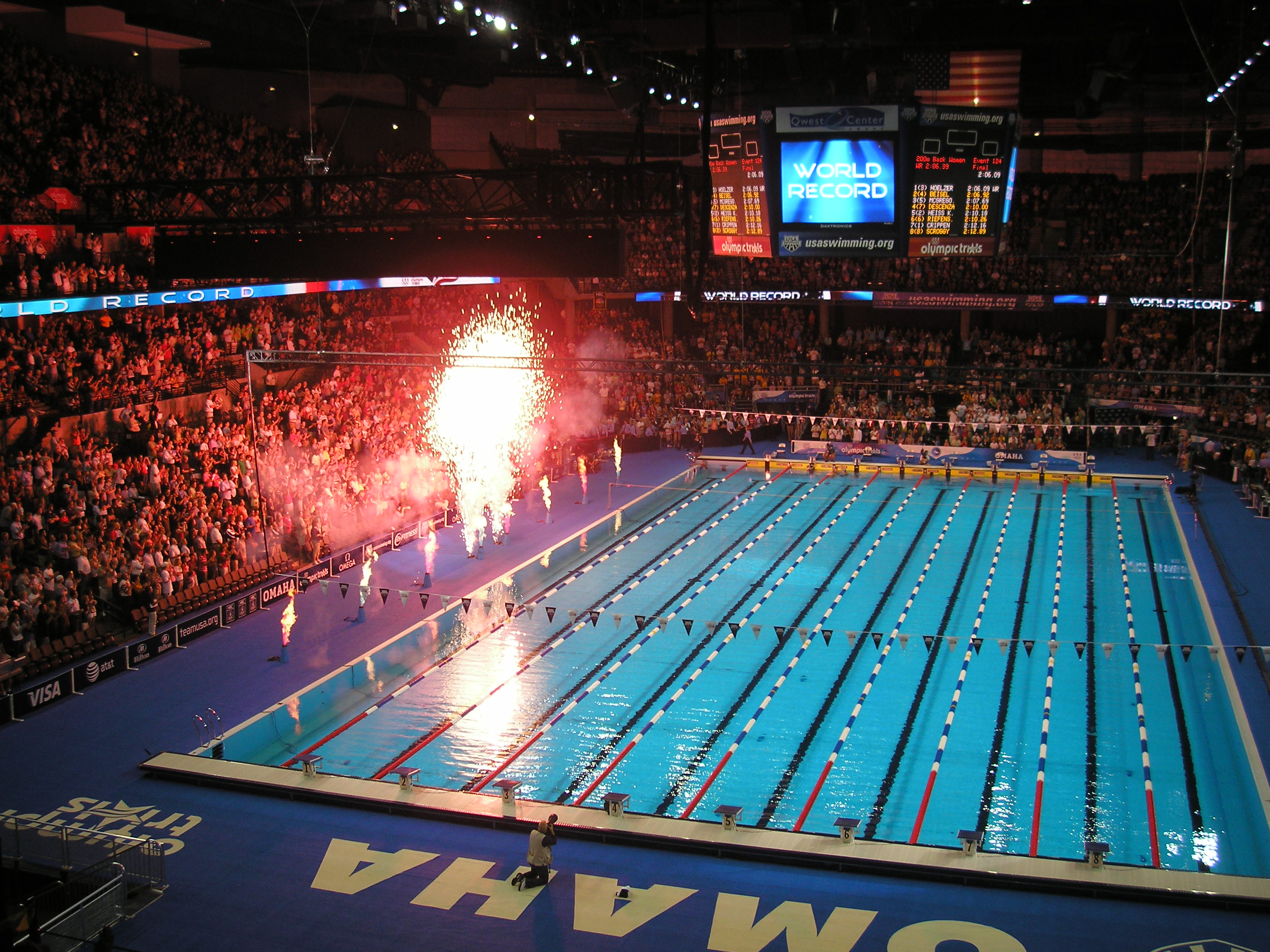
US Olympic Swimming Trials in June 2008

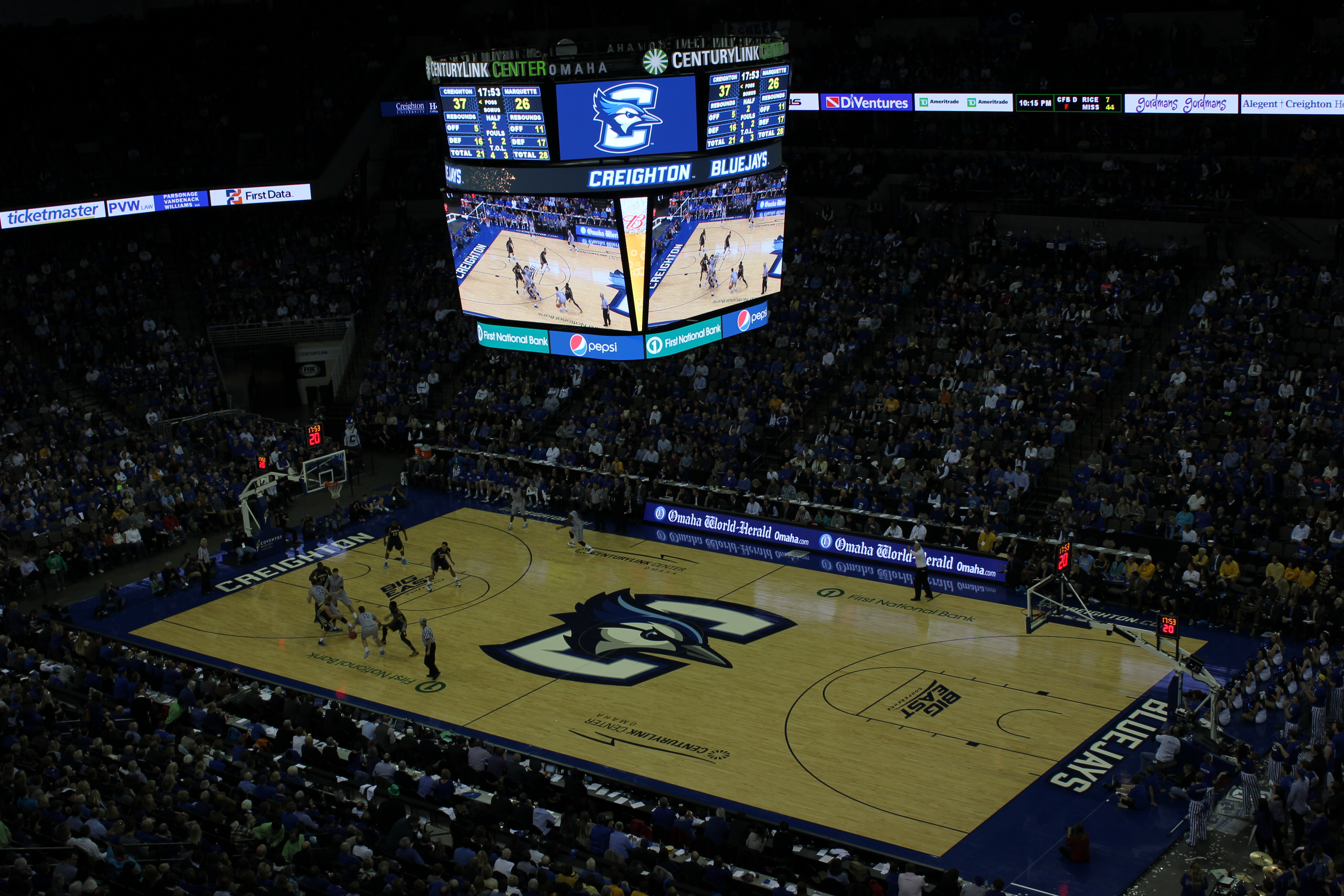
2013 Scoreboard & Logo

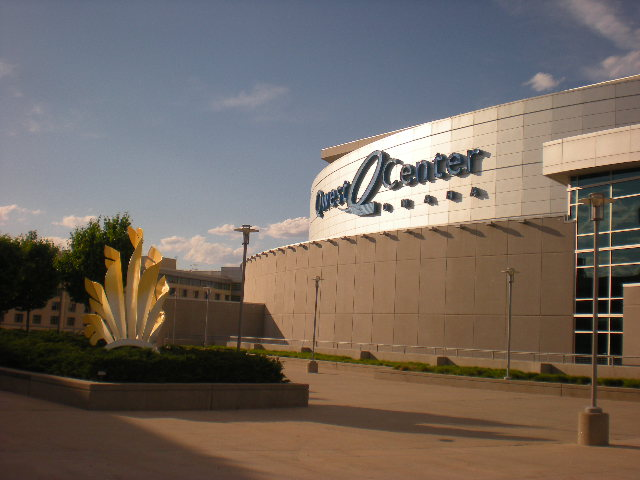
South façade prior to 2011

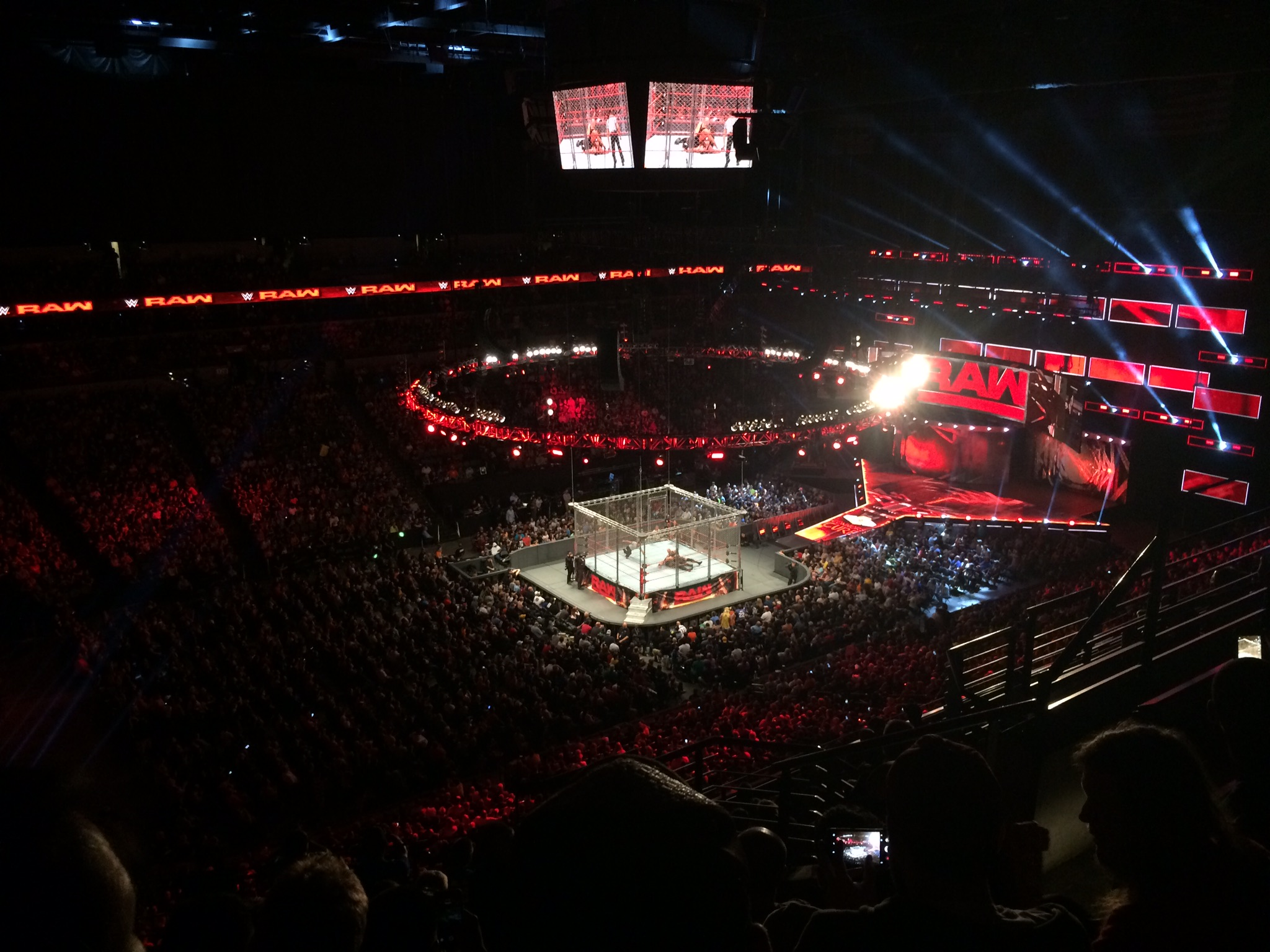
Monday Night Raw on September 4, 2017

== See also ==
- Omaha Civic Auditorium – (defunct)
- Baxter Arena
- Mid-America Center
- Rosenblatt Stadium – (defunct)
- Ak-Sar-Ben – (defunct)
- Charles Schwab Field
- Morrison Stadium
- Liberty First Credit Union Arena
- Werner Park
- List of NCAA Division I basketball arenas
- List of basketball arenas
