= CenturyTel of Colorado =

CenturyTel of Colorado, Inc.
- Type: Subsidiary slogan =
- Industry: Telecommunications
- Founded: 1976
- Headquarters: Pagosa Springs, CO, United States
- Products: Local Telephone Service
- Parent: Lumen Technologies
- Website: http://www.centurylink.com/

CenturyTel of Colorado, Inc. is a telephone operating company owned by Lumen Technologies that provides local telephone service in Colorado, including Pagosa Springs. The company is separate from CenturyTel of Eagle and Qwest Corporation, the other local telephone companies CenturyLink owns in Colorado.

The company was established in 1976 as the Universal Telephone Company of Colorado. The company was acquired by Century Telephone in 1990 and in 1996 changed its name to Century Telephone of Colorado, Inc. In 1998, the company changed its name to CenturyTel of Colorado, Inc.

The company does business as CenturyLink, a name its parent company adopted in 2009 following the acquisition of Embarq. Lumen continues to use the CenturyLink brand for its home and small business operations.
