= CenturyLink of Minnesota =

CenturyLink of Minnesota, Inc.
- Type: Private (Subsidiary of CenturyLink)
- Industry: Telecommunications
- Founded: 1968
- Products: Local Telephone Service
- Parent: United/Sprint Nextel (1968-2006); Embarq (2006-2009); CenturyLink (2009-present)
- Website: http://www.centurylink.com/

CenturyLink of Minnesota, Inc. is a local telephone operating company providing service in Minnesota. It was founded in 1968 as the local phone operation in the state of United Utilities, which later became Sprint Corporation.

In 2006, the company, known then as Sprint Nextel Corporation, spun-off its local telephone operation into a separate company, Embarq Corporation. The local operating company was renamed Embarq Minnesota, Inc.

Embarq was acquired by CenturyTel in 2009, which in 2010 changed its name to CenturyLink. Embarq Minnesota, at that point, began doing business under the CenturyLink name. The company's legal name was changed in 2022 to reflect its ownership by CenturyLink after most former Embarq local companies were sold off to Brightspeed.
