= Kate Johnson (businesswoman) =

American business executive

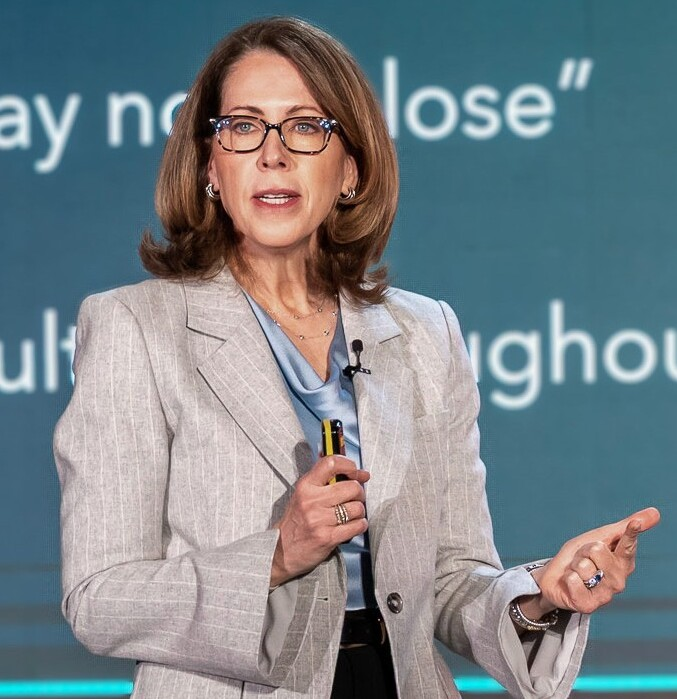
- Education: Lehigh University (BA); Wharton School (MBA)
- Occupation: Business executive
- Title: CEO of Lumen Technologies

Kate Johnson is an American business executive. She has served as the CEO of Lumen Technologies since November 2022. She was previously president of Microsoft US, and has held leadership roles at Oracle, General Electric, and Red Hat. Johnson is one of 10% of Fortune 500 CEOs who are women.

== Early life and education ==
Johnson grew up in Red Bank, New Jersey. She studied electrical engineering at Lehigh University, graduating in 1989. Johnson earned an MBA from the Wharton School.

== Career ==
Johnson began her career at Deloitte, then moved to UBS and Red Hat. She served as a senior vice president at Oracle for almost six years. In 2013, she joined General Electric, spending nearly four years in various executive roles, including CEO of Intelligent Platforms and chief commercial officer for GE Digital, the company's software business. From 2017 to 2021, she was president of Microsoft US. In November 2020, Johnson was appointed to the board of directors of UPS.

Johnson became Lumen Technologies' first female CEO in November 2022. By 2023, she was one of the 10% of Fortune 500 CEOs who were women. Johnson inherited a legacy telecommunications company assembled largely from the assets of CenturyLink and Level 3 Communications. Early in her tenure, she worked to change the company's culture, narrow its product focus, and rebuild execution capability in order to return the business to revenue and stability. Johnson executed a deal for $5 billion in AI contracts in August 2024 and secured a partnership with Microsoft. During her tenure, the company also signed deals with Amazon Web Services, Meta, and Google Cloud, and sold its consumer division to AT&T in May 2025 for $5.75 billion, paying off $4.8 billion in debt using the proceeds. She's guided the company to evolve with the AI boom.

== Personal life ==
Johnson met her husband, Todd, when they were undergraduates at Lehigh University. They have two children.
