= Glen Post =

Glen F. Post III (born October 4, 1952) was the chief executive officer and president of CenturyLink, an S&P 500 communications service provider based out of Monroe, Louisiana.

He earned a bachelor's degree in accounting in 1974 at Louisiana Tech University and an MBA in 1976 at Louisiana Tech.

Post joined CenturyTel in 1976. He was named vice president in 1982 and was promoted to senior vice president and treasurer in 1984. He was appointed to the CenturyTel board of directors in 1985, and the following year he was promoted to senior vice president and chief financial officer. In 1988 Post was named executive vice president and chief operating officer. He became the president and chief operating officer of CenturyTel in 1990. In 1992 Post was named vice chairman of the board, president, and chief executive officer. In 2002 he was appointed chairman of the board and chief executive officer. Since 2009 Post has been chief executive officer and president of CenturyLink. His honors include: Louisiana Tech College of Administration and Business Distinguished Alumni in 1991, Louisiana Tech University Tower Medallion Award in 1997 and DeGree Enterprises Lifetime Achievement Award in Business 2003.

CenturyLink’s 2014 annual revenues were $18 billion, up from $360 million in 1992 when Post was appointed CEO. Post is on the National Security Telecommunications Advisory Committee (NSTAC) and a number of other boards and foundations.

In December,2023, the launch of Glen's newest company PhireLink was announced. PhireLink, a strategic joint venture aimed at enhancing high-speed internet accessibility throughout rural and underserved regions of the United States. Glen Post, Chairman and CEO of PhireLink, stated: "The launch of PhireLink marks a new chapter in our quest to deliver superior, dependable communication services to rural America's underserved communities. This initiative is not only the foundation of our growth but also embodies our conviction that access to the internet is an essential need for every American."
