= CenturyTel of Chester =

Telephone operating company

CenturyTel of Chester, Inc.
- Type: Subsidiary
- Industry: Telecommunications
- Founded: 1961
- Products: Local Telephone Service
- Parent: Lumen Technologies
- Website: http://www.centurylink.com/

CenturyTel of Chester, Inc. is a telephone operating company owned by Lumen Technologies that provides local telephone service in Chester, Iowa and areas of Minnesota directly north.

The company was established in 1961 as the Chester Telephone Company. The company was acquired by Century Telephone and changed its corporate name to Century Telephone Company of Chester, Inc. in 1995. In 1998, Century Telephone shortened its name to CenturyTel and the Iowa company changed its corporate name to CenturyTel of Chester, Inc., the name it retains today.

The company does business as CenturyLink, a name its parent company adopted in 2009 following the acquisition of Embarq. Lumen continues to use the CenturyLink branding for its home and small business operations.

== See also ==
- CenturyLink
