= Telephone USA of Wisconsin =

Telephone USA of Wisconsin, LLC
- Trade name: CenturyLink
- Company type: Subsidiary
- Industry: Telecommunications
- Founded: 1999
- Headquarters: Wisconsin
- Products: Local telephone service, Broadband internet
- Parent: Lumen Technologies
- Website: http://www.centurylink.com/

Telephone USA of Wisconsin, LLC is a local exchange carrier telephone operating company in Wisconsin owned by Lumen Technologies. The company provides service under the CenturyLink brand. The company's cities include Suring and Gillett.

== History ==
The company was founded in 1999. CenturyTel acquired the company in 2000, adding 62,650 lines at a cost of $170 million.

=== Proposed sale ===
On August 3, 2021, Lumen announced its sale of its local telephone assets in 20 states to Apollo Global Management, including Wisconsin, which closed in October 2022, launching the new Brightspeed brand. However, Telephone USA of Wisconsin was not included in the assets sold, unlike the rest of Lumen's Wisconsin operations. It remains one of the CenturyLink operating companies.
