= CenturyTel of the Gem State =

CenturyTel of the Gem State, Inc.
- Type: Private (Subsidiary of CenturyLink)
- Industry: Telecommunications
- Founded: 1901
- Products: Local Telephone Service
- Parent: Telephone Utilities/PTI (1966-1997); CenturyLink (1997-present)
- Website: http://www.centurylink.com/

CenturyTel of the Gem State, Inc. is a telephone operating company providing local telephone services in Idaho and northern Nevada owned by CenturyLink.

The company was established in 1901 as the Gem State Utilities Corporation. The company was acquired by Telephone Utilities in 1966 as the first company TU would acquire to expand its footprint.

The state of Nevada approved the company's request to provide telephone service in the state in 1973.

The company was part of Pacific Telecom until 1997, when it was acquired by Century Telephone. Following this acquisition, Century Telephone launched its rebranding as "CenturyTel" and changed the name of the holding company Pacific Telecom to CenturyTel of the Northwest. Gem State Utilities then changed its name to CenturyTel of the Gem State, Inc. in 1998.
