= CenturyTel of Eagle =

CenturyTel of Eagle, Inc.
- Type: Private (Subsidiary of CenturyLink)
- Industry: Telecommunications
- Founded: 1928
- Products: Local Telephone Service
- Parent: Pacific Telecom (until 1997); CenturyLink (1997-present)
- Website: http://www.centurylink.com/

CenturyTel of Eagle, Inc. is one of the CenturyLink operating companies in Colorado. The company was formed in 1928 as The Eagle Valley Telephone Company and originally served Eagle, Rio Blanco, and Routt counties in Colorado.

In 1980, the company changed its name to Eagle Telecommunications, Inc. It was later acquired by Pacific Telecom.

In 1995, Pacific Telecom completed its acquisition of 45 telephone exchanges serving 50,000 customers from US West. The operations were added to Eagle Telecommunications, enlarging the company a great deal.

In 1997, Century Telephone completed its acquisition of Pacific Telecom, changing its name to CenturyTel. CenturyTel's subsidiaries changed their names to reflect the rebranding, and Eagle Telecommunications became known as CenturyTel of Eagle, Inc.

In 2009, CenturyTel began doing business as CenturyLink following its acquisition of Embarq.

The company, in 2011, acquired Qwest Corporation, formerly Mountain Bell, reuniting the lines sold by US West in 1995 with the same parent.
