= AT&T Alascom =

Telecommunication company

Alascom, Inc.

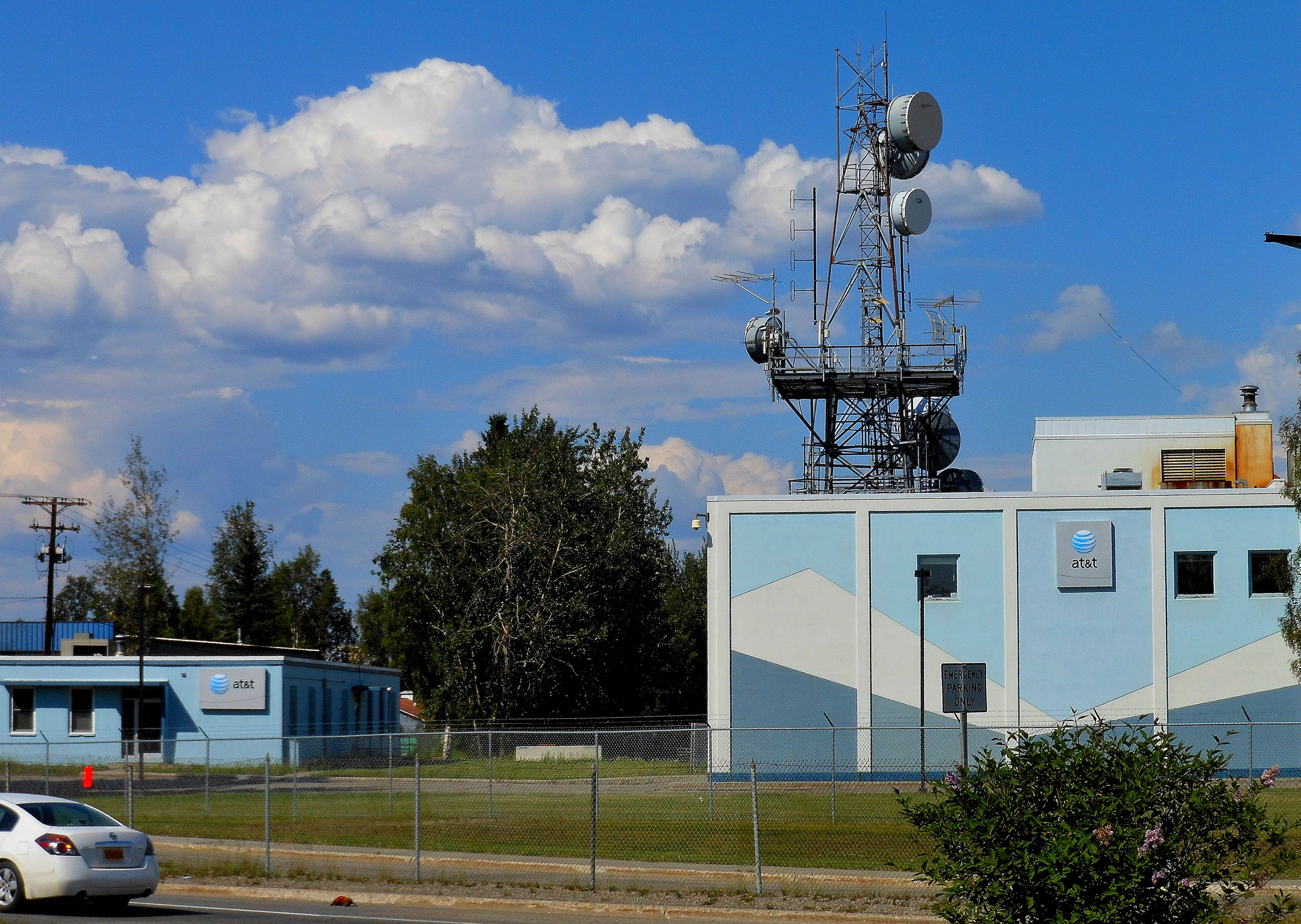
- AT&T Alascom buildings in Fairbanks in June 2012.
- Trade name: AT&T Alaska
- Company type: Subsidiary
- Industry: Telecommunications
- Founded: 1900; 126 years ago, as the Washington-Alaska Military Cable and Telegraph System (WAMCATS)
- Headquarters: Anchorage, Alaska, United States
- Products: Telecommunications
- Parent: RCA (1970-1979); Pacific Telecom (1979-1995); AT&T Corp. (1995-2005); AT&T Inc. (2005-present)
- ASNs: 6290, 6308

Alascom, Inc., doing business as AT&T Alaska, is an Alaskan telecommunications company; specifically, an interexchange carrier (IXC). AT&T Alascom is currently a wholly owned subsidiary of AT&T Inc. AT&T Alascom, previously known as Alascom and many other names, was the first long-distance telephone company in Alaska. AT&T Alascom has extensive telecommunications infrastructure in Alaska, including three satellites, undersea and terrestrial cables containing optical fiber, and numerous earth stations.

Unlike most of the United States, AT&T had no role in Alaskan telecommunications as a local or long distance telephone provider until the purchase of Alascom in 1995. Alaska was also never served by any of the Regional Bell Operating Companies.

Alascom and General Communications, Inc. have been the two primary competitors for long-distance telephone service in Alaska since GCI's founding in 1979.

== History ==
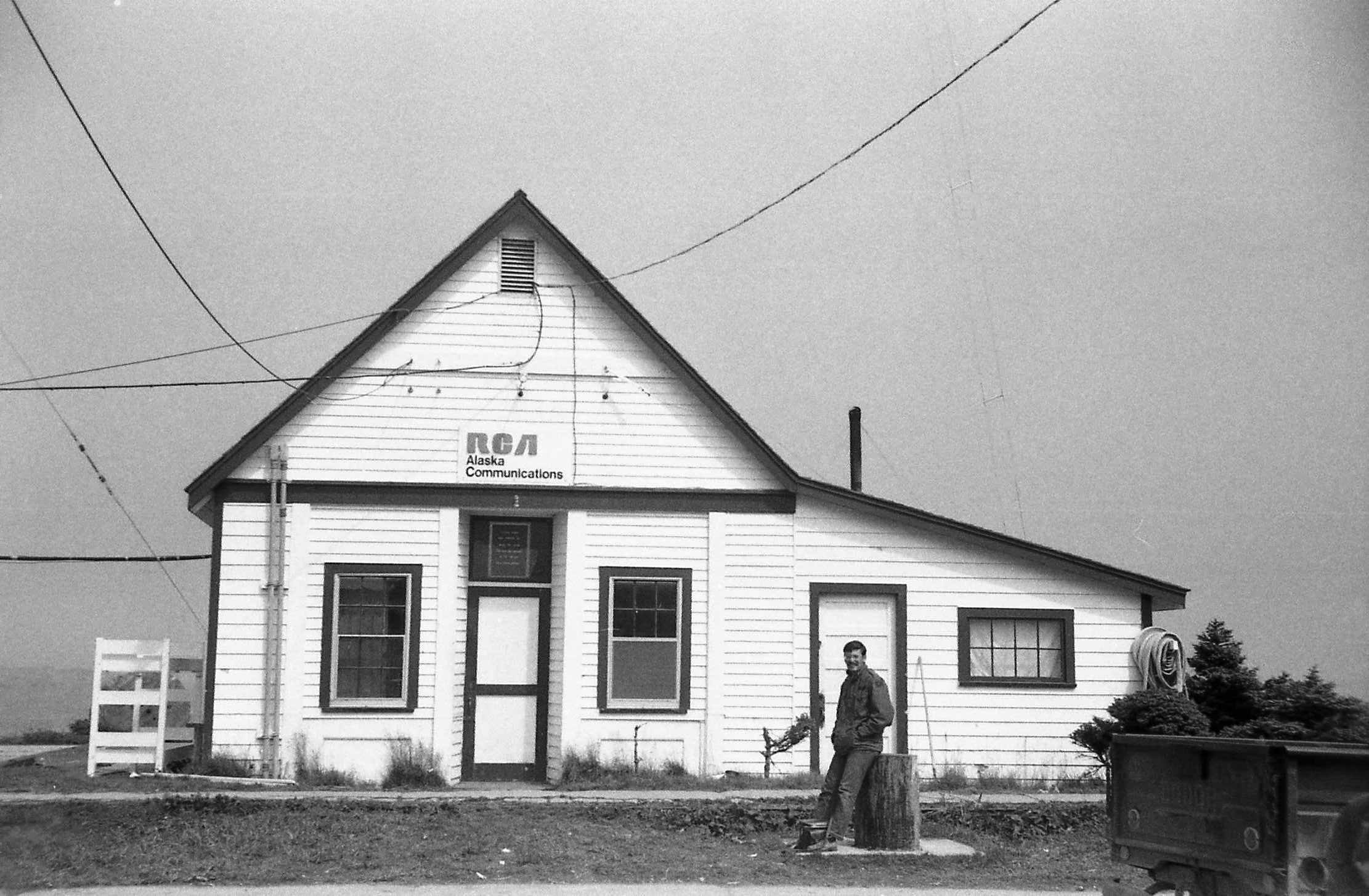
Alascom (then owned by RCA) building in Unalaska in August 1972. As with much of rural Alaska in the 1970s, this building contained the community's only telephone at the time.

The company began in 1900 when the U.S. Congress authorized the U.S. Army Signal Corps to create the Washington-Alaska Military Cable and Telegraph System, or WAMCATS.

During the 1940s and World War II, the U.S. Army completed the system and it became known as the Alaska Communications System (ACS) and the White Alice Communications System.

In 1970, RCA Corporation purchased ACS and renamed it RCA Alascom. Alascom greatly built up the telecommunications infrastructure in the state during this time, due to RCA's major involvement in communications satellites.

In 1979, Pacific Power & Light Company (later known as PacifiCorp), thru its subsidiary Pacific Telecom, Inc., purchased RCA Alascom and it became known as Alascom, Inc.

The company launched three communications satellites into orbit: Aurora I on October 27, 1982, Aurora II on May 29, 1991, and Aurora III (later renamed AMC-8) in 2000. All three satellites are dedicated solely to providing telecommunications services to Alaska.

On October 18, 1994, AT&T Corporation announced its intention to acquire Alascom. On August 7, 1995, Pacific Telecom sold Alascom to AT&T for $260 million. Alaska regulatory approval of both that purchase and SBC's later purchase of AT&T required that AT&T Alascom continue to exist as a separate entity.

== See also ==
- List of United States telephone companies
