= Pacific Telecom =

American telecommunications company

CenturyTel of the Northwest, Inc.
- Type: Private (Subsidiary of CenturyLink)
- Industry: Telecommunications
- Founded: July 5, 1955
- Headquarters: Vancouver, Washington, United States
- Key people: Norman Howerton, founder
- Services: Fixed-line telephony
- Parent: PacifiCorp (1972–1997); CenturyLink (1997–present)
- Subsidiaries: CenturyTel of the Gem State

Pacific Telecom, Inc., originally Telephone Utilities, Inc. and now CenturyTel of the Northwest, Inc., was an independent telephone company that owned over 600,000 telephone lines in 12 states prior to its acquisition by CenturyTel.

== History ==
Norman Howerton owned Ilwaco Telephone and Telegraph, a local telephone operating company serving Ilwaco, Washington. He sought to upgrade the equipment his company was using, and to build capital in 1955 he organized Telephone Utilities as a holding company to attract investors and modernize his telephone network.

As customers began to join IT&T, the company began to expand. In 1966, Telephone Utilities made its first acquisition, acquiring Gem State Utilities of Idaho. By 1972, it acquired 22 companies that provided telephone service to 60,000 customers in four states. Telephone Utilities also began to consolidate management of its telephone operations into semi-autonomous districts to allow for greater efficiency.

In 1973, Telephone Utilities was acquired by the Pacific Power and Light Company (PP&L) of Portland, Oregon. PP&L already owned telephone companies located in Montana and Oregon serving 40,000 customers through its Northwestern Telephone Systems. PP&L's existing telephone operations were placed under control of Telephone Utilities. It continued to grow and acquire small telephone companies and, in the process, upgrading switching facilities. Electronic switching was introduced in Kalispell, Montana, in 1975. In 1979, 14 separate telephone companies that Telephone Utilities acquired were merged into Telephone Utilities of Washington. Also that year, Pacific Power and Light acquired Alascom from RCA.

In 1982, PP&L placed the two phone companies into one company called Pacific Telecom, Inc., headquartered in Vancouver, Washington. PP&L became PacifiCorp.

Throughout the 1980s, the company diversified into other fields, including cellular telephony, and then laid a trans-Pacific cable to Japan.

Beginning in 1993, US West Communications, a Bell Operating Company, began selling some of its telephone lines to Pacific Telecom. In 1993, Pacific Telecom announced it would acquire 45 exchanges serving 50,000 telephone lines in Colorado from US West. The deal closed in February 1995, becoming a part of Pacific Telecom's Eagle Telecommunications division. Later that year, Pacific Telecom acquired US West telephone lines in Oregon and Washington, adding 36,000 telephone lines. The transaction closed in October 1995.

In 1995, Pacific Telecom sold Alascom to AT&T for $365 million.

=== Sale to CenturyTel ===
In 1997, PacifiCorp sold PTI to another largely rural carrier, Century Telephone. In 1998, the company's legal name was changed to CenturyTel of the Northwest, Inc. and all of PTI's subsidiaries' corporate names were changed to reflect CenturyTel ownership.
