= Lumen Technologies =

American telecommunications company

Lumen Technologies, Inc.
- Formerly: Central Telephone and Electronics, Inc.; Century Telephone Enterprises, Inc.; CenturyTel, Inc.; CenturyLink, Inc.
- Type: Public
- Traded as: NYSE: LUMN; S&P 600 component
- Industry: Telecommunications
- Predecessors: Pacific Telecom; Embarq; Qwest; Level 3 Communications
- Founded: 1930; 96 years ago
- Headquarters: Monroe, Louisiana, U.S.
- Area served: Worldwide
- Key people: Kate Johnson (CEO)
- Services: Network, Cloud Security, Voice, Managed Services, Big Data as a Services, Multi-Cloud Management, Private Cloud, Public Cloud, SaaS Apps, Cloud Connect, Internet, Phone, TV
- Revenue: ▼US$17.48 billion (2022)
- Operating income: ▼US$95 million (2022)
- Net income: ▼ −US$1.55 billion (2022)
- Total assets: ▼US$45.58 billion (2022)
- Total equity: ▼US$10.44 billion (2022)
- Number of employees: c. 25,000 (2024)
- Subsidiaries: Lumen Technologies Operating Companies
- ASN: 3356
- Website: lumen.com

Lumen Technologies, Inc. (formerly CenturyLink, Inc.) is an American telecommunications company headquartered in Monroe, Louisiana. It offers network, security, cloud, voice, and other managed communications services through its fiber optic and copper networks, data centers and cloud computing services. The company has been included in the S&P 600 index since March 2023, and was previously listed among the S&P 500.

Its communications services have included local and long-distance voice, broadband internet, Multiprotocol Label Switching, private line (including special access), Ethernet, hosting (including cloud hosting and managed hosting), data integration, video, network, public access, Voice over Internet Protocol (VoIP), information technology, and other ancillary services.

Lumen has gone through many acquisitions, divestments, and structural changes. In the 20th century, this primarily consisted of buying and selling local telecom providers. Larger mergers at the beginning of the 21st century added internet service providing to Lumen's core business. As cloud computing became more important, Lumen acquired businesses serving enterprise cloud customers, while divesting its consumer connectivity business to AT&T and Brightspeed.

== History ==
The earliest predecessor of Lumen was the Oak Ridge Telephone Company in Oak Ridge, Louisiana, which was owned by F. E. Hogan Sr. In 1930, Hogan sold the company, with 75 paid subscribers, to William Clarke and Marie Williams, for $500. In 1946, Clarke McRae Williams received ownership of the family's telephone company as a wedding gift. Clarke purchased the Marion Telephone Company and eventually made it his base of operation as he grew his company through more acquisitions. The company remained as a family-operated business until it became incorporated in 1968. It went public in 1978.

=== 1967–1999 ===
By 1967, Oak Ridge Telephone Company served three states with 10,000 access lines. That year, the company was incorporated as Central Telephone and Electronics. Clarke M. Williams served as president and chairman of the board.

In 1971, the company was renamed Century Telephone Enterprises, Inc. In 1972, Century Telephone acquired the La Crosse Telephone Corporation, of Wisconsin. This began a multi-decade spree of acquisitions which grew the size of the company. The company went public in 1978 on the New York Stock Exchange.

In 1985, Century Telephone sold several subsidiaries to Colonial Telephone for $4.66 million.

In 1987, the stock price rapidly increased from its low that year, before dropping in the 1987 stock market crash. Earnings grew each year from their 1983 low, and by 1987 they reached nearly US$20 million.

From 1991 to 1995 the company continued its acquisition strategy which added tens of thousand of phone lines and grew the long term debt from $205 million to $602 million with $115 million in annual net income. By 1995 it was the 16th largest communications company in the United States with over 3000 employees. Two hundred employees were unionized through the Communications Workers of America.

In 1997 the company bought Pacific Telecom for $1.5 billion. This acquisition added 1.9 million cell lines to Century's network and nearly doubled the size of the company. After the acquisition Century's network served 21 states and 2 million customers. The company sold off some of its telephone assets to smaller competitors for hundreds of millions of dollars.

=== 2000s ===
In 2000, the company acquired 490,000 telephone lines from Verizon for $1.5 billion. It then sold "substantially all" of its wireless business to Alltel for $1.59 billion in 2002. Through 2002 the company grew to nearly 7000 employees with approximately 1500 of them organized in various unions. At this time the company had about $800 million in net income and $3.6 billion in debt. In 2003 the company acquired Digital Teleport ($39 million) which then formed some of its main assets and expanded the company's fiber network offering. By 2004, CenturyTel was the eighth largest local telephone provider in the United States. In this time it paid down its long term debt to $2.7 billion and its net income fell to $337 million annually. In 2005, CenturyTel began offering satellite television services. In 2007, CenturyTel acquired NC-based CLEC Madison River Communications which was also the parent company of four ILEC operations in NC (MebTel), GA (Coastal Communications), AL (GulfTel Communications) and IL (Gallatin River Communications). Also in 2007, a "workforce reduction" resulted in 600 employees laid-off as well as receiving $336 million in Federal and State subsidy. CenturyTel received an additional $333 million the previous year. Most of these funds were received through the "High Cost Support Loop" program. From 2004 to 2007 CenturyTel repurchased approximately $2 billion in shares.

=== 2008 merger with Embarq and name change to CenturyLink ===
CenturyLink logo, used for their residential services

On October 27, 2008, Embarq announced that it would be acquired by CenturyTel, Inc. in an all-stock transaction valued at about $6 billion. CenturyTel's CEO Glen Post would remain CEO of the merged company following the acquisition, and remained CEO until 2018. Embarq was the former landline business of Sprint and served cities in 18 states, including Nevada, Florida, North Carolina, and Ohio. The deal made CenturyTel the third-largest landline phone provider in Pennsylvania behind Verizon (through both Verizon Pennsylvania and Verizon North) and Comcast. On June 2, 2009, a press release announced that the combined CenturyTel/Embarq entity would be called CenturyLink. Denver-based Monigle Associates was retained to formulate the new brand strategy. The acquisition was completed on July 1, 2009.

On October 19, 2009, CenturyTel and Embarq brandings were retired, and all business was officially conducted under the CenturyLink banner, continuing to trade on the NYSE under the CenturyTel stock ticker CTL. The new corporate name, CenturyLink, Inc., did not become official until May 2010.

=== 2010 merger with Qwest ===
Network map of combined Qwest and CenturyLink assets

On April 22, 2010, CenturyLink (at this point still legally known as CenturyTel, Inc.) announced it would acquire Qwest in a stock-for-stock transaction. Under the agreement, CenturyLink would swap 0.1664 of its shares for each share of Qwest; as a result, CenturyLink shareholders prior to the merger wound up with 50.5% share of ownership in the combined company, while former Qwest shareholders gained the remaining 49.5%. The valuation of CenturyLink's purchase was $12 billion. The merger was completed on April 1, 2011.

After the merger, CenturyLink became the largest landline provider in the state of Colorado as well as the third largest telecom company in the US. At the time, the new company had 17 million access lines, 5 million broadband customers, and 1.4 million video subscribers across 37 states. Additionally, the acquisition meant CenturyLink would become owner of Former Regional Bell Operating Company, US West, due to Qwest's purchase of the company in the year 2000.

=== Further acquisitions 2011–2019 ===
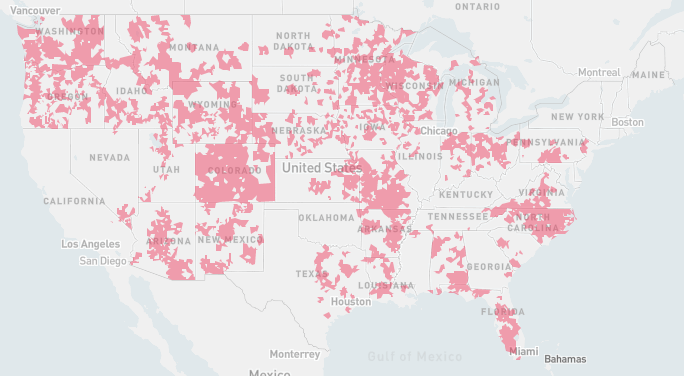
Availability map by zip code as of 2016

In July 2011, CenturyLink acquired Savvis, Inc., a global provider of cloud infrastructure and hosted IT services for $2 billion, which represented all outstanding shares of Savvis common stock at $40 per share. This acquisition allowed CenturyLink to provide expanded managed hosting and cloud services. In October 2012, Savvis acquired the ITO Business Division of Ciber, which added managed services to their business. By December, CenturyLink launched Savvisdirect an expansion of CenturyLink's portfolio of Savvis cloud services for small businesses, IT administrators, and developers. In June 2013, Savis acquired AppFog, a Portland-based Platform as a Service provider. In November CenturyLink acquired Tier 3, a Seattle-based infrastructure as a service (IaaS) platform and provider of advanced cloud management. However, Tier 3 became part of CenturyLink Cloud rather than Savvis. At the time, Tier 3 operated nine data centers in the Seattle region while Savvis operated 55. CenturyLink planned to build out two to four new datacenters in 2014. The CTO of Tier3, Jared Wray, took the CenturyLink Cloud CTO position after the acquisition. SavvisDirect was retired in 2014 as part of an internal consolidation of CenturyLink's cloud service offerings.

On December 8, 2014, CenturyLink announced the acquisition of DataGardens, Inc., a Disaster Recovery as-a-Service (DRaaS) provider based in Edmonton, Alberta, Canada.

On December 11, 2014, CenturyLink announced the acquisition of Cognilytics, a 200-employee predictive analytics company.

On March 30, 2016, CenturyLink announced the acquisition of netAura, a security services company that focuses on cybersecurity, security information and event management (SIEM), and vulnerability management that typically works with government customers.

On October 31, 2016, CenturyLink announced its intent to acquire Level 3 Communications in a deal valued at around $25 billion. After securing the necessary regulatory approvals, CenturyLink closed the transaction on November 1, 2017. This acquisition can now be viewed as a takeover from the inside. Level3 shareholders would only approve the deal if CenturyLink retired their CFO and eventually CEO. Eventually all former CenturyLink executives would be replaced by former Level3 managers leaving only HR and legal executives in place.

On January 9, 2017, CenturyLink announced the acquisition of Edison, New Jersey–based SEAL Consulting, a SAP services provider. CenturyLink ended 2017 with $1.3 billion in net income.

By the end of 2018, CenturyLink had $35 billion in long term debt. It determined it had overestimated the value of its goodwill and wrote down a $2.7 billion loss. This resulted in a $1.7 billion loss in net income for 2018. In 2018 along with 91 additional Fortune 500 companies it had "paid an effective federal tax rate of 0% or less" as a result of Donald Trump´s Tax Cuts and Jobs Act of 2017.

On September 10, 2019, CenturyLink announced the acquisition of Streamroot, a provider of technology to improve video and static content delivery within bandwidth constrained areas.

=== 2020 name change to Lumen ===
On September 14, 2020, CenturyLink, Inc announced that it had changed its name to Lumen Technologies, Inc. Effective with the opening of the trading day on September 18, 2020, the company stock ticker changed from CTL to LUMN. The CenturyLink brand will continue to be the customer-facing brand for traditional copper-based services. Fiber-based products and services use the brand Quantum Fiber.

=== 2021 to present ===
On August 3, 2021, Lumen announced it would sell its incumbent local exchange carrier (ILEC) operations in 20 states to Apollo Global Management for $7.5 billion. Lumen structured the deal to retain their infrastructure in urban and suburban areas which they still wanted to upgrade from copper to fiber and sell-off areas that they deemed unworthy of further investment. Lumen retained ILEC operations in 16 states, mostly the operations formerly served by Qwest. The sale closed in October 2022; the sold ILEC operations were rebranded as Brightspeed.

Lumen has won multiple government contracts. Throughout 2021, it won a managed network service contract with United States Postal Service and a connectivity contract with US Army Recruiting and the US Navy Judge Advocate General Corps.

The company continued to have difficulty generating profit in 2022. The executives divided the company into "Growth", "Nurture", "Harvest" sections, which correspond to high, low, and very-low/negative margins. The goal was to move customers from Nurture to Grow products and to sell off the Harvest products. Landline sales continued to fall but Lumen focused on growing the profitable fiber services. This led to the $2.7 billion sale of its Latin American business which was rebranded as Cirion.

In 2023, a deal was signed with Colt Technology Services in which Lumen EMEA, its subsidiary serving the Europe, Middle East, and Africa enterprise markets, would be sold to Colt for $1.8 billion. The deal allows Lumen to continue serving multinational enterprise customers via Colt's infrastructure.

In August 2024, Lumen and Corning closed a deal for fiber supply.

In May 2025, Lumen announced an agreement to sell 95% of Quantum Fiber, its mass markets consumer fiber business operating in 11 U.S. states, to AT&T for $5.75 billion. The sale closed on February 2, 2026, in which the service was rebranded to "Quantum Fiber from AT&T".

As of October 2025, Lumen had secured $10 billion in Private Connectivity Fabric (PCF) contracts with 15 customers, including Amazon, Google Cloud, Meta, and Microsoft.

In May 2026, Lumen announced it would be acquiring networking software company Alkira for $475 million.

In February 2026, Lumen partnered with Anthropic to grow its fiber-optic network in North America, and had more than 2,000 network-as-a-service (NaaS) customers. The same month, the company introduced Multi-Cloud Gateway, an upgraded version of its Cloud Connect service, which simplifies connectivity between enterprise customers and multiple cloud providers.

== Products and services ==
Lumen's products and services focus on three segments: enterprise business, small business, and residential.

=== Lumen enterprise business ===
Lumen Enterprise Business provides products and services around network, cloud, security, voice, and managed services to enterprise customers. Lumen's network services include SD-WAN, MPLS/IPVPN, hybrid WAN, Ethernet, Internet access, wavelength services, dark fiber, and private lines. Lumen Cloud provides big data as a service, Internet of Things (IoT), multi-cloud management, private cloud, public cloud, bare metal, SaaS applications, and cloud connect. Lumen Security monitors more than a billion security events daily. Services include: cloud, infrastructure, DDoS, web application, email, and web security. The company also provides analytics and threat management, risk and compliance support, and threat research labs. CenturyLink offers voice products ranging from traditional landlines to unified communications and collaboration (UC&C) services and was recognized in 2018 by Frost & Sullivan for "growth excellence in VoIP access and SIP trunking". Lumen's managed services include advanced professional services, IT consulting, and strategic partnerships.

In October 2023 Lumen announced sale of select content delivery network (CDN) customer contracts to Akamai, winding down the CDN business.

=== CenturyLink small business ===
CenturyLink Small Business provides products and services around Internet, phone, TV, and cloud applications. Like CenturyLink Residential, CenturyLink Small Business offers DirecTV, but the residential and business packages are designed for the different settings.

=== CenturyLink residential ===
CenturyLink Residential provides Internet (either DSL or Gigabit Fiber, depending on the package), voice, and TV, via partnership with DirecTV. The company also offers bundling with Verizon Wireless.

=== Availability by state ===
CenturyLink residential and small business services are available in the following states:

- Arizona
- California
- Colorado
- Florida
- Idaho
- Iowa
- Kentucky
- Minnesota
- Montana
- Nebraska
- Nevada
- New Mexico
- North Dakota
- Oregon
- South Dakota
- Utah
- Washington
- Wyoming

=== Fiber ===
Quantum Fiber is a fiber to the premises service in the United States, providing broadband Internet to a small and fast growing number of locations. The service was first introduced to Omaha, Nebraska, and next rolled out to Las Vegas, Nevada, with plans for expansion to several other markets. Unlike the company's existing high speed Internet deployments, which utilize fiber-to the node/neighborhood to increase the speed of ADSL2+ speeds up to 20/2 Mbit/s, Vectored VDSL2+ speeds up to 140/10 Mbit/s, in these markets CenturyLink now installs their fiber optic cable all the way to the home or business with speeds up to 1,000 Mbit/s download and 1,000 Mbit/s upload using Calix Optical Network Terminals. On February 2, 2014, CenturyLink announced the availability of Gigabit fiber service to multi-tenant businesses in Salt Lake City and surrounding communities. On August 5, 2014, CenturyLink announced the expansion of its gigabit fiber service to 16 additional markets. On September 15, 2015, CenturyLink announced the expansion of its gigabit fiber service to residential and business customers in six additional states, increasing the company's service coverage to select areas of 17 states.

Lumen maintains and operates dark fiber within the United States for the Department of Defense, contracting announcements indicate. This is a continuation of CenturyLink's work.

Gigabit Fiber markets

State	Availability by City
Arizona	Flagstaff, Phoenix-Mesa-Scottsdale, Prescott, Safford, Sierra Vista-Douglas, Tucson, Yuma
Colorado	Boulder, Colorado Springs, Denver-Aurora-Lakewood, Fort Collins, Grand Junction, Greeley, Pueblo
Florida	Arcadia, Cape Coral-Fort Myers, Clewiston, Crestview-Fort Walton Beach-Destin, Deltona-Daytona Beach-Ormond Beach, Naples-Immokalee-Marco Island, Ocala, Orlando-Kissimmee-Sanford, Punta Gorda, Sebring, Tallahassee, The Villages, Longwood
Iowa	Ames, Cedar Rapids, Davenport-Moline-Rock Island, Des Moines-West Des Moines, Dubuque, Omaha-Council Bluffs, Sioux City, Waterloo-Cedar Falls
Idaho	Blackfoot, Boise City, Burley, Hailey, Idaho Falls, Lewiston, Pocatello, Rexburg, Twin Falls
Minnesota	Alexandria, Bemidji, Duluth, Minneapolis-St. Paul-Bloomington, Rochester, St. Cloud
Montana	Billings, Bozeman, Great Falls, Helena, Kalispell, Missoula
Nebraska	Grand Island, Omaha-Council Bluffs
Nevada	Las Vegas-Henderson-Paradise
New Mexico	Albuquerque, Farmington, Las Cruces, Santa Fe
North Dakota	Bismarck, Dickinson, Fargo
Oregon	Albany, Bend-Redmond, Corvallis, Eugene, Grants Pass, Hermiston-Pendleton, Medford, Portland-Vancouver-Hillsboro, Prineville, Salem
South Dakota	Pierre, Rapid City, Sioux Falls, Yankton
Utah	Cedar City, Heber, Logan, Ogden-Clearfield, Provo-Orem, Salt Lake City, St. George, Summit Park
Washington	Aberdeen, Bellingham, Bremerton-Silverdale, Kennewick-Richland, Longview, Moses Lake, Olympia-Tumwater, Port Angeles, Portland-Vancouver-Hillsboro, Seattle-Tacoma-Bellevue, Spokane-Spokane Valley, Walla Walla, Yakima
Wyoming	Casper, Cheyenne, Gillette, Jackson, Laramie, Rock Springs

=== Data centers ===
On May 2, 2017, CenturyLink, Inc. completed the previously announced sale of its data centers and colocation business to funds advised by BC Partners, in a consortium including Medina Capital Advisors and Longview Asset Management. The deal was worth approximately $1.86 billion, with CenturyLink retaining an approximately 10% equity stake in the consortium's newly formed global secure infrastructure company, Cyxtera Technologies.

== Organizational structure ==
As of 2018, Lumen is the second largest U.S. communications provider to global enterprise customers, second to Comcast. CenturyLink has customers in more than 60 countries and has been named one of America's best customer service companies (alongside Frontier and Spectrum).

Name	Title	Ref
Kate Johnson	President and chief executive officer	
Dave Ward	Chief Technology and Product Officer	
Mark Hacker	Executive Vice President and Chief Legal Officer	
Chris Stansbury	Executive Vice President and Chief Financial Officer	
Ashley Haynes-Gaspar	Executive Vice President and Chief Revenue Officer	
Ana White	Executive Vice President and Chief People Officer	
Kye Prigg	Executive Vice President of Enterprise Operations	
Ryan Asdourian	Executive Vice President and Chief Marketing & Strategy Officer	
Wes Gibson	Executive Vice President of Mass Markets	

== Naming rights and sponsorships ==
=== Venue naming rights ===
==== Current ====
- Lumen Field – Seattle, Washington (formerly Seahawks Stadium, Qwest Field, and CenturyLink Field)

==== Former ====
- CenturyLink Arena Boise – Boise, Idaho (now Idaho Central Arena, formerly Bank of America Centre and Qwest Arena)
- CenturyLink Center – Bossier City, Louisiana (now Brookshire Grocery Arena, formerly Bossier City Arena and CenturyTel Center)
- CenturyLink Center Omaha – Omaha, Nebraska (now CHI Health Center Omaha, formerly Qwest Center Omaha)

=== Sponsorships ===
- Denver Broncos
- Orlando Magic
- Idaho Steelheads
- Seattle Seahawks
- Texas Rangers
- Tampa Bay Buccaneers
- Minnesota Vikings
- Portland Trail Blazers
- ULM
- LA Tech

== Outages and other issues ==
=== 911 outages ===
The Federal Communications Commission ordered CenturyLink to pay a record $16 million for failing to alert authorities of a preventable programming error that left nearly 11 million people in seven states without access to emergency services for six hours in 2014.

On December 27, 2018, a "nationwide outage" caused 9-1-1 service to be disrupted across the country. In some areas the outage lasted nearly twelve hours and was the third shutdown of the year following outages in April and November 2018. ATM and point of sale credit card machines were also widely affected. The outage resulted in 886 calls to 911 failing to deliver. The FCC investigated but did not place any fine or recommendation on Lumen.

In 2020, 911 outages in South Dakota, North Dakota, Minnesota, Colorado, Arizona, Utah and North Carolina led to additional FCC investigations. Lumen agreed to pay $3.8 million in civil damages for failing to deliver 911 calls.

In 2022, additional outages, in South Dakota, resulted in a criminal finding from the FCC:

An investigation by the FCC’s Enforcement Bureau found that Lumen apparently willfully and repeatedly violated FCC rules by failing to notify public safety call centers in a timely manner of both 911 outages and by deploying a system that was insufficient to transmit all 911 calls reliably to public safety call centers in the second outage, creating a significant threat to the life and property of tens of thousands of people.

In 2023, outages on Lumen's network, in Nebraska, resulted in no 911 calls being fulfilled for over 10 hours.

In 2024, there were multiple 911 service disruptions in South Dakota. The FCC announced additional investigation into these outages. In these outages local officials claim service was not disrupted because the texting system was still operational.

=== Other issues ===
In 2018 along with 90 additional Fortune 500 companies it had "paid an effective federal tax rate of 0% or less" as a result of Donald Trump´s Tax Cuts and Jobs Act of 2017.

In December 2018, CenturyLink faced criticism for requiring residential customers in Utah to, via DNS hijacking, view and acknowledge a notice advertising its security and parental control software, before they could connect to the internet again. The provider claimed that this was required by a recently enacted state law, which requires all ISPs to inform users that they provide "the ability to block material harmful to minors". Bill sponsor and Utah State Senate member Todd Weiler stated that the law did not require that service be disrupted until the notice is acknowledged; the law only requires that this notice be delivered in a "conspicuous" manner (such as an advertisement within a bill or invoice) and does not require disruption of service.

On January 8, 2020, CenturyLink was required to pay $8.9 million to customers in Minnesota in a settlement regarding over-billing. In addition to the payment, CenturyLink is required to reform billing practices and submit audits to the Minnesota Attorney General's office. CenturyLink disagreed with the charges, but settled to avoid litigation costs.

On August 30, 2020, CenturyLink suffered a major technical outage due to misconfiguration in one of the company's data centers. The outage impacted tech giants such as Cloudflare, Amazon, Twitter, Xbox Live and many more. Reports indicate that it took over seven hours for all services to be restored.

On March 9, 2024, connectivity services maintained by Lumen were disrupted affecting AmTote, a company that provides totalisator services used to control parimutuel betting for horse racing. The disruptions rendered several thoroughbred racetracks across the United States unable to process bets, and forced Tampa Bay Downs to run their signature horse race, the Tampa Bay Derby, as a non-wagering event.

Lumen Technologies was reported to have been affected by a 2024 attack from the Salt Typhoon advanced persistent threat linked to the Chinese government.

== See also ==
- List of Lumen Technologies operating companies
- List of United States telephone companies
- Tier 1 network
