= Forsee =

Forsee is a surname. Notable people with the surname include:

- Gary Forsee (born 1950), American business executive
- William Forsee, American political activist

== See also ==
- Corby–Forsee Building, commercial building in St Joseph, Missouri, US
