= Michael Middleton (academic) =

- Occupation: Academic administrator

Michael A. Middleton is an American academic, a deputy chancellor emeritus, and a professor emeritus at the University of Missouri School of Law. On November 12, 2015, he was appointed interim president of the University of Missouri after the previous president, Timothy Wolfe, resigned as the result of the 2015 University of Missouri protests. Middleton served in this role until March 2017.

Middleton received a bachelor's degree from the University of Missouri in 1968 and graduated from the University of Missouri School of Law in 1971, becoming the third black graduate of the school. After working for various offices within the federal government, including the EEOC, he returned to the University of Missouri in 1985. Since 1998, he was a deputy chancellor. He retired as a deputy chancellor on August 31, 2015.

He was appointed as interim president of Lincoln University in May 2017, serving until May 31, 2018.
