= 2015–2016 University of Missouri protests =

Series of student protests

2015 University of Missouri protests
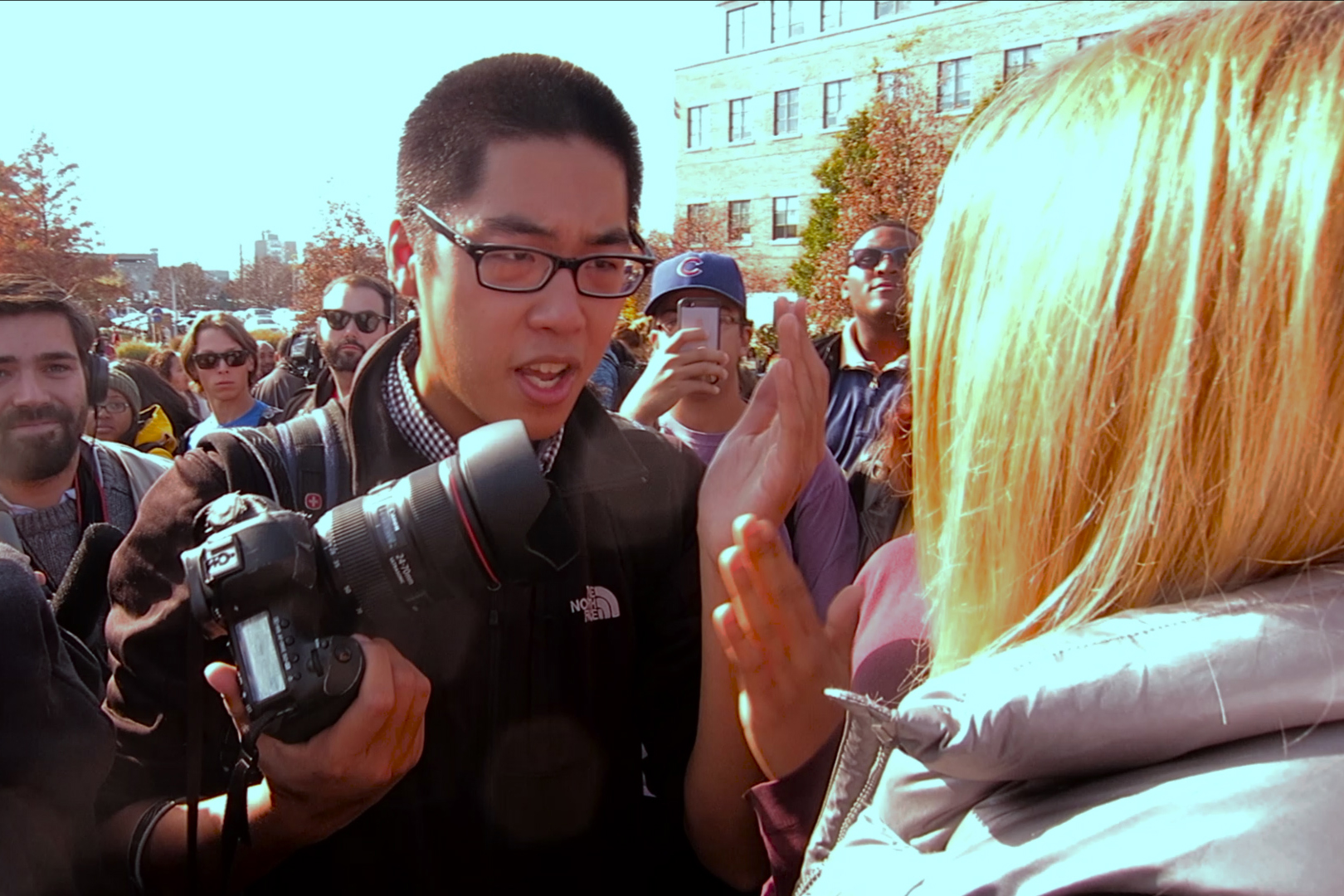
- Student photojournalist Tim Tai in a confrontation with assistant director of Greek life Janna Basler. Tai's attempt to photograph a tented encampment became a major incident in the protests.
- Location: Columbia, Missouri
- Methods: Occupations; Online activism; Hunger strike; Boycott

Lead figures
Payton Head, student government president Jonathan Butler, hunger striker Legion of Black Collegians	Timothy Wolfe, president of University of Missouri System; R. Bowen Loftin, chancellor of University of Missouri

In 2015, a series of protests at the University of Missouri related to race, workplace benefits, and leadership resulted in the resignations of the president of the University of Missouri System and the chancellor of the flagship Columbia campus. The moves came after a series of events that included a hunger strike by a student and a boycott by the football team. The movement was primarily led by a student group named Concerned Student 1950, referencing the first year black students were allowed to enroll in the university. The movement and protests were documented in two films, one made by MU student journalists and the other, 2 Fists Up, by Spike Lee. While it is alleged that bad publicity from the protests has led to dropping enrollment and cutbacks, others have cited budget cuts issued from the state legislature.

== Background ==
In 2010, two white students dropped cotton balls in front of the Gaines/Oldham Black Culture Center. They were arrested and charged with tampering, which is a felony, and which was prosecuted as a hate crime based on evocation of the historical slur "cotton picker" to describe enslaved or sharecropping black people. The prosecutor asked for them to serve 120 days in jail but they were eventually only convicted of littering, which is a misdemeanor, and sentenced to probation and community service with no jail time. In 2011 a student was given probation for racist graffiti in a student dormitory. The events led to the creation of a diversity initiative called "One Mizzou" under MU chancellor Brady Deaton. This initiative was discontinued in 2015 owing to concerns that it had lost its meaning.

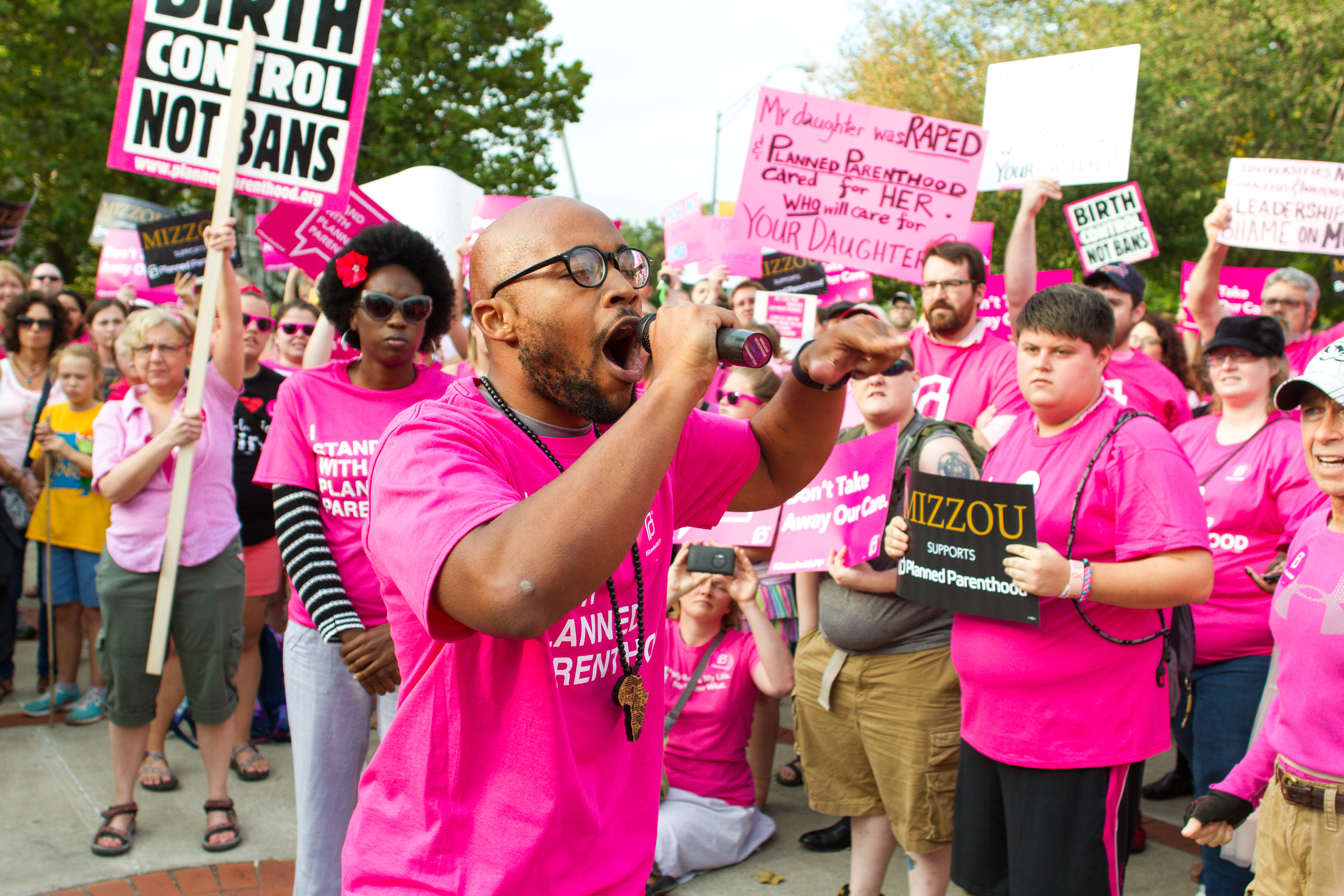
University of Missouri student Jonathan Butler at a Planned Parenthood rally at the University of Missouri in September 2015

On September 12, 2015, a Facebook post by the student government president Payton Head described bigotry and anti-gay sentiment around the college campus, which gained widespread attention. He claimed that in an incident off campus, unidentified people in the back of a passing pickup truck directed racial slurs at him. "For those of you who wonder why I'm always talking about the importance of inclusion and respect, it's because I've experienced moments like this multiple times at THIS university, making me not feel included here." Chancellor R. Bowen Loftin called the incident "totally unacceptable" on September 17.

=== Protests ===
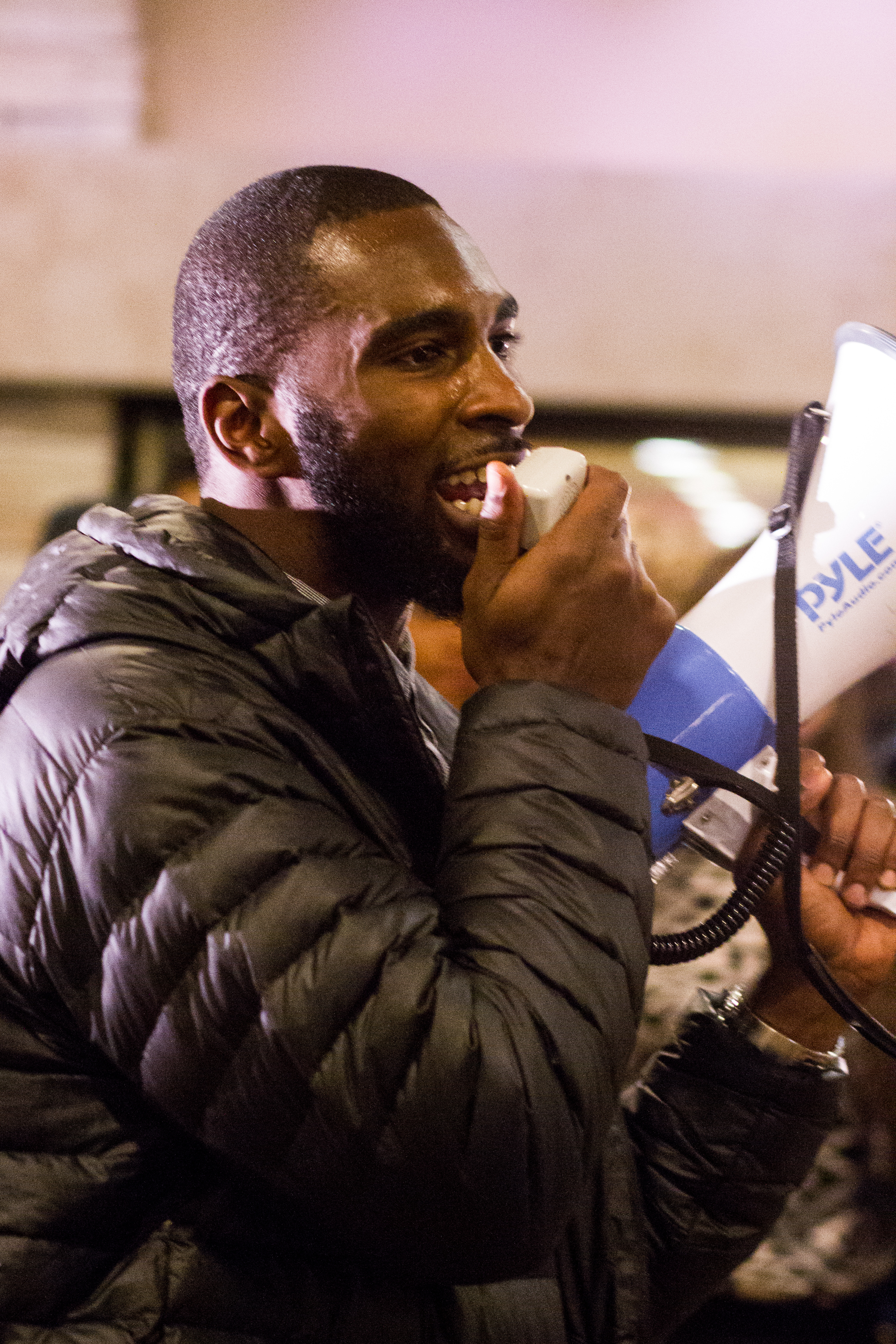
A Concerned Student protester in the commons area, November 11, 2015

The first student protests occurred on September 24, 2015, at an event called "Racism Lives Here," where protesters claimed nothing had been done to address Head's concerns. On October 1, a second "Racism Lives Here" event was held with 40–50 participants.

An incident involving a drunken student on October 4 gave rise to more racial tensions. While an African-American student group, the Legion of Black Collegians, was preparing for Homecoming activities, a white student walked on stage and was asked to leave. Supposedly, while departing the premises the student said, "These niggers are getting aggressive with me", according to the LBC. This prompted chancellor Loftin, traveling outside the US, to record a video message in response and to release a statement that said, "Racism and all prejudice is heinous, insidious and damaging to Mizzou... That is why all of us must commit to changing the culture at this university." Later that month, the student group "Concerned Student 1950" was created, referring to the first year the University of Missouri admitted black students.

On October 24, a police officer responding to a property damage complaint reported that an unknown vandal had smeared feces in the shape of a swastika on a bathroom wall in a dorm on campus.

On November 3, student Jonathan Butler launched a hunger strike, vowing not to eat until the president resigned. One of Butler's stated reasons for this was that Timothy Wolfe's car had struck him during a protest against Wolfe at the school's homecoming parade. During the incident, Students confronted the president by linking arms in front of his vehicle. Wolfe revved the car's engine and drove into Butler. No police charges were filed in connection to the incident.

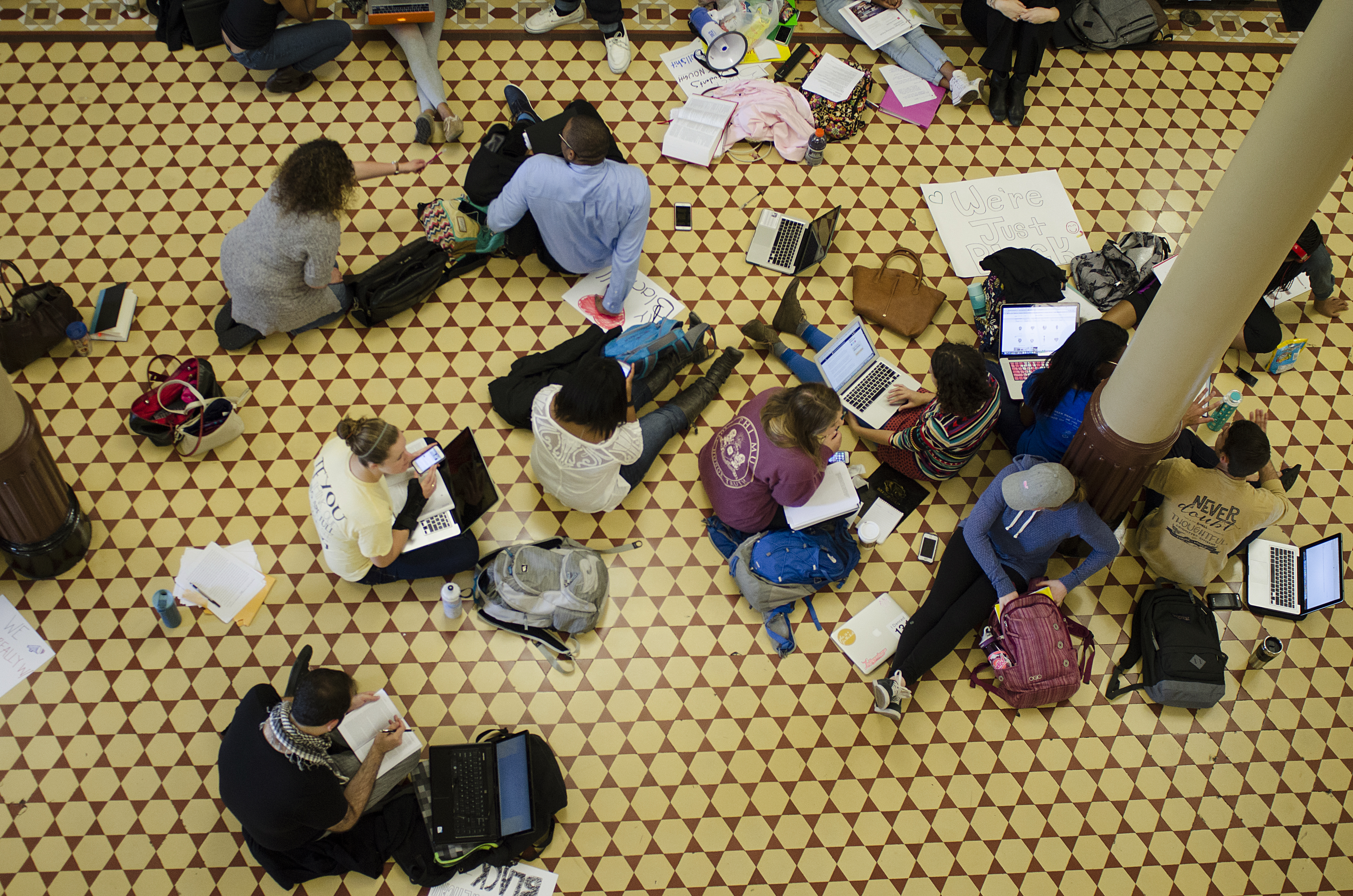
Occupation protest in Jesse Hall, October 6, 2015

His statement said, "Mr. Wolfe had ample opportunity to create policies and reform that could shift the culture of Mizzou in a positive direction but in each scenario he failed to do so." Butler later cited his participation in the Ferguson protests against the 2014 shooting of Michael Brown as a major influence for his action.

On November 7, with hundreds of prospective students flooding Mizzou's campus for the university's recruiting day, student protesters intervened with a "mock tour" where they recited racist incidents that occurred at MU beginning in 2010 with the dispersion of cotton balls on the lawn of the Gaines/Oldham Black Culture Center along with more recent events such as the use of racial epithets against two young women of color outside of the MU Student Recreation Complex.

On November 8, Mizzou football players announced they would not practice or play until Wolfe resigned, potentially costing the university a $1 million fine if they had to forfeit an upcoming game against Brigham Young University. The Southeastern Conference Football Commissioner issued a statement saying, "I respect Missouri's student-athletes for engaging on issues of importance and am hopeful the concerns at the center of this matter will be resolved in a positive manner." The Mizzou Athletics Department previously indicated that it fully supported the players' actions.

The protests attracted widespread local, regional, and national news media attention. Some protesters said the coverage was impacted by journalists' lack of previous race-related experience, reliance on scripted behaviors, and desire to cover the event as "outsiders looking in."

=== Loss of health insurance for grad students ===
One of Butler's reasons for his hunger strike was "graduate students being robbed of their health insurance". In August 2015, the university had issued a statement to graduate students that said, "The Affordable Care Act prevents employers from giving employees money specifically so they can buy health insurance on the individual market. Graduate teaching and research assistants are classified as employees by the IRS, so they fall under this ruling." The university had known about the Affordable Care Act concerns since July 21, but put off communicating with graduate students until announcing on August 14 that subsidies would be cut, the day before graduate health insurance plans were set to expire.

=== Rolla arrest ===
A computer science and math student at Missouri University of Science and Technology in Rolla confessed during his arrest to making a hoax threat to the university. An account with the same username on Reddit bragged that he had "trolled" Mizzou.

== Resignations ==
Wolfe issued a statement on November 8 implying that he would not step down and that he was "dedicated to ongoing dialogue to address these very complex, societal issues as they affect our campus community".

On November 9, however, Wolfe announced his resignation. Later that day Chancellor Loftin announced he would resign at the end of 2015 to take a research role at the university. His departure was hastened by the Board of Curators on November 11, who passed his responsibility to Interim Chancellor Hank Foley. His departure was initially assumed to be related to the protests. However, unlike Wolfe, student protesters had not requested that he step down. His resignation was the congruence of several issues raised by administrators and faculty, who were displeased with his leadership style, dismissal of administrators, and management of several campus incidents of racism and graduate health insurance subsidies that were allowed to lapse under his leadership.

The days after the resignation announcement resulted in some confusion, cancelled classes and reports of threats and suspicious activity. On the evening of November 10, there were reports of vehicles and unidentified individuals around campus posing a threat.

== Reactions ==
=== Melissa Click incident ===
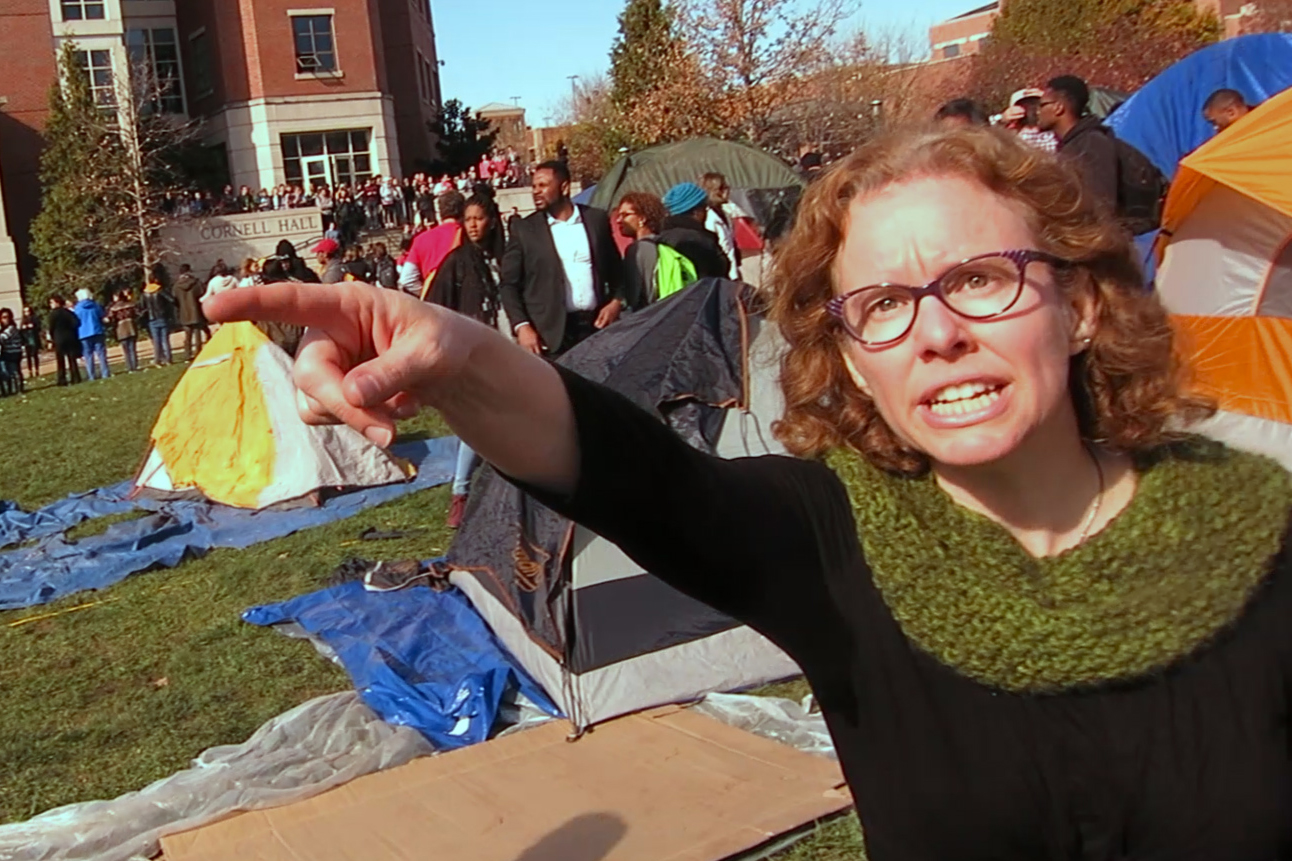
A frame from a student's video made famous by social media

Soon after the announcement of the resignations, there was a widely publicized dispute between student photojournalist Tim Tai, on a freelance assignment for ESPN, and protesters on Carnahan Quad where they had erected an encampment. While attempting to cover the event, Tai got into a dispute with, and was physically confronted by, students and those who would later be identified as University of Missouri staff and faculty, including untenured communication professor Melissa Click. Click appeared to grab Tai's camera after he approached her asking if "he could be here", and then threatened student Mark Schierbecker, yelling, "Who wants to help me get this reporter out of here? I need some muscle over here." Other staff who interfered with Tai's attempts to photograph the scene included Janna Basler, the university's assistant director of Greek life and leadership, and Richard J. "Chip" Callahan, professor and chair of religious studies. Schierbecker's video of Tai excercising his right to be in a public area became widely distributed and commented on in the mainstream media.

The day after the incident, with Tai getting support from the Missouri Lieutenant Governor Peter Kinder and others, the campus group Concerned Student 1950 passed out fliers calling the confrontation between journalists and protesters a "Teachable Moment" and directing the students to welcome the media to campus as a way to tell the story of the protests. They also removed signs previously put up warning the media to stay away from the student encampments. Three University of Missouri employees involved in the altercation apologized and Click resigned from her courtesy appointment at the Missouri School of Journalism. On January 25, 2016, Click was charged with misdemeanor assault linked to her behavior during the incident and accepted community service in exchange for dismissal of the charges.

As of January 5, 2016, more than 100 faculty members had signed a letter in defense of Click. Several faculty members wrote letters of support to local and national news outlets.

In a video obtained by the Columbia Missourian in February 2016, Click was seen shouting a profanity at police officers as they attempted to clear protesting students from a road at the school's homecoming parade. Click defended her actions, saying that she was sorry for her language but that she was also sorry she had to put herself in front of the police to protect the students.

That same month, the Faculty Council and Intercampus Faculty Council urged administrators and the board of curators to comply with the system's Collected Rules and Regulations when dealing with Click.

On February 25, 2016, the University of Missouri Board of Curators voted 4–2 to terminate Click's employment with the university. As a result of this action, the University of Missouri was placed on the American Association of University Professors' Censure List. Commenting in an interview with the Chronicle of Higher Education, Click stated, "I'm a white lady. I'm an easy target." In 2017, she was hired as a lecturer by Gonzaga University, where she later became an assistant professor.

=== KKK hoax ===
On November 10, 2015, Student Body President Payton Head made a Facebook saying, "Students please take precaution. Stay away from the windows in residence halls. The KKK has been confirmed to be sighted on campus. I'm working with the [campus police], the state trooper and the National Guard." Major Brian Weimer with the school's police department repudiated Head's comments, stating that there was no known KKK presence on campus nor was the National Guard present. Head apologized and retracted his comments, saying on Facebook, "I'm sorry about the misinformation that I have shared through social media."

On November 11, 2015, the MU officially remained open, though many individual classes were cancelled after threats on social media and by phone. During a meeting between the Missouri Legislative Black Caucus and student activists, University of Missouri police reported that an anonymous caller phoned in a threat to the Oldham Black Culture Center.

One professor, Dale Brigham, was at the center of controversy when he chose to administer a planned exam for Nutritional Science 1034, saying, "If you don't feel safe coming to class, then don't come to class... I will be there, and there will be an exam administered in our class," while allowing students an option to take a make-up exam. After some students complained that the professor was not taking the threats seriously, Brigham apologized and offered his resignation, saying, "If my leaders think that my leaving would help, I am all for it. I made a mistake, and I do not want to cause further harm." However, the university turned down the resignation later that day.

Gus T. Ridgel, one of the nine African-American students enrolled into the University of Missouri in 1950, "was surprised and disappointed by the racist incidents at the university that prompted a campus upheaval".

U.S. Air Force Lt. Col. Jarred Prier argues that Russian influence operatives use U.S. social media as an information warfare medium, spreading false information during incidents of racial unrest in order to inflame racial tensions in the United States and discredit the Obama administration.

=== Related protests ===
The University of Missouri events inspired other protests or indications of solidarity at over eighty other campuses in the United States. Among these were Ithaca College, Yale University, Smith College, Claremont McKenna College, Amherst College, Emporia State University, Brandeis University, and Tufts University.

On November 13, the dean of students at Claremont McKenna College stepped down, after student protesters adopted similar tactics to those in Missouri, including a hunger strike.

=== Appointment of interim president ===
On the evening of November 12, the governing board of the University of Missouri decided in a closed-door meeting to name Michael Middleton, a law professor and deputy chancellor emeritus as the interim president. Middleton, a 1968 graduate of the university and the third African American to graduate from its law school, recently retired from the university after 30 years.

=== Politicians ===
During an interview with ABC News' George Stephanopoulos, President Barack Obama praised the protesters, but cautioned against protest tactics that he felt stifled open dialogue at the University of Missouri and other campuses. He said, "There is clearly a problem at the University of Missouri, and that's not just coming from students. That's coming from some faculty. And I think it is entirely appropriate for students in a thoughtful, peaceful way to protest—what they see as injustices or inattention to serious problems in their midst. I want an activist student body just like I want an activist citizenry."

Missouri Lieutenant Governor Peter Kinder issued a statement supporting the journalists covering the protests on November 9. He called for investigating the incident saying, "Faculty and staff cannot be allowed to pick and choose which rights, viewpoints and freedoms they respect. I renew my call to restore law and order on campus, so the rights of all are protected."

=== Turning away reporters at campus meeting ===
On February 10, 2016, Concerned Student 1950 held a meeting on campus. The meeting had been advertised as a "town hall" for "black students and students of color." The group asked all reporters to leave before the meeting began. Several white reporters then left the room. However, one reporter, Mark Schierbecker, the same videographer from the November Melissa Click incident, refused, and justified his refusal to leave by saying the unreserved room was a "limited public forum" that was open to students and that she was a reporter on assignment and it was her "personal preference" to stay. Despite the meeting taking place on campus property, the group continued to ask her to leave, and eventually threatened to call campus police. Instead, the group disbanded soon after the start of the meeting, intending to relocate the meeting at a more private area of campus.

=== Student enrollment and alumni reaction ===
According to The New York Times, freshman enrollment for the fall 2017 semester was down by 35% compared with two years prior. Seven dormitories have been temporarily closed and some 400 positions have been cut. "Students of all races have shunned Missouri, but the drop in freshman enrollment last fall was strikingly higher among blacks, at 42 percent, than among whites, at 21 percent."

=== Formal report ===
Adrianna Kezar and Sharon Fries-Britt, at the invitation of the university, used the events as a case study and published a report in 2018. It introduces a "Collective Trauma Recovery Framework (CTRF) for dealing with such complex and usually emotionally charged incidents".
