= 2008 United States presidential election in Nebraska =

- November 4, 2008

Nominee	John McCain	Barack Obama
Party	Republican	Democratic
Home state	Arizona	Illinois
Running mate	Sarah Palin	Joe Biden
Electoral vote	4	1
Popular vote	452,979	333,319
Percentage	56.53%	41.60%

McCain
50–60%
60–70%
70–80%
80–90%
Obama
40–50%
50–60%
President before election
George W. Bush
Republican
Elected President
Barack Obama
Democratic

The 2008 United States presidential election in Nebraska took place on November 4, 2008, as part of the 2008 United States presidential election. Voters chose five electors to the Electoral College, who voted for president and vice president.

Nebraska is one of the two states of the U.S. that, instead of giving all of its electors to the winner based on its statewide results, allocates just two electoral votes to the winner of the statewide popular vote. The other three electors vote based on each congressional district's results.

Nebraska, statewide, was not a swing state in 2008. Located in the Great Plains of the United States, it is one of the most staunchly Republican states in the country. While some hypothetical general election match-up polls between Republican John McCain and Democrat Barack Obama showed the race to be seemingly close, they were largely regarded as outliers as more polls released showed McCain leading in double digits. McCain wound up carrying the popular vote in Nebraska by 14.93 points, taking in 56.53% of the total statewide vote. However, Obama narrowly defeated McCain in Nebraska's 2nd congressional district, which contains Omaha and the surrounding areas. Obama was the first Democrat to win the district since 1964.

Due to Nebraska's system of allocating electoral votes to winners of Congressional Districts, Obama won one electoral vote while John McCain received the state's other four electoral votes. On top of this, his 41.6% of the statewide popular vote is the highest a Democratic presidential candidate has won in Nebraska since Lyndon B. Johnson carried the state in his 1964 landslide. This was the first election ever that Nebraska split its electoral votes, the first since 1964 that a Democrat won an electoral vote from the state, which would later occur in 2020, and 2024, and the first state to split its electoral votes without faithless electors since 1960. As of 2024, this remains the last time that a Democrat has won more than 40% of the vote in Nebraska.

== Primaries & caucuses ==
- 2008 Nebraska Democratic presidential caucuses
- 2008 Nebraska Republican presidential primary

== Campaign ==
=== Predictions ===
There were 16 news organizations who made state-by-state predictions of the election. Here are their last predictions before election day:

Source	Ranking
D.C. Political Report	Likely R
Cook Political Report	Solid R
The Takeaway	Solid R
Electoral-vote.com	Solid R
Washington Post	Solid R
Politico	Solid R
RealClearPolitics	Solid R
FiveThirtyEight	Solid R
CQ Politics	Solid R
The New York Times	Solid R
CNN	Solid R
NPR	Solid R
MSNBC	Solid R
Fox News	Likely R
Associated Press	Likely R
Rasmussen Reports	Safe R

=== Polling ===
McCain led in every single pre-election poll. Since May, he led in each poll by a double-digit margin of victory and each with at least 52% of the vote.

=== Fundraising ===
John McCain raised a total of $678,059 in the state, while Barack Obama raised $864,393.

=== Advertising and visits ===
Obama spent $55,807 while McCain and the Republican Trust PAC spent a total of just $1,225. Both Obama and McCain visited the state once. Obama held a downtown rally at Omaha and McCain traveled to both Omaha and Ashland. Palin also visited Omaha once.

=== Campaign in Omaha ===
Nebraska has two electoral votes that go to the winner of the popular vote in the state, while the other three are split based on whichever candidate wins the popular vote in each of Nebraska's three congressional districts, all of which have trended Republican in the past elections. However, Nebraska's 2nd congressional District, which encompasses Omaha, is significantly less conservative.

Nebraska's second congressional was considered as a battleground area by some, leading the Obama campaign to open a single campaign office in Omaha with 15 staff members to cover the congressional district in September 2008. More than 900 people attended the opening of those offices. Democratic Mayor Mike Fahey of Omaha said that he would do whatever it takes to deliver the electoral vote tied to the 2nd Congressional District to Obama, and the Obama Campaign considered Nebraska's 2nd congressional district "in play". Former Democratic U.S. Senator Bob Kerrey and then senior U.S. Senator Ben Nelson campaigned in the city for Obama.

== Analysis ==
Nebraska, part of the conservative Great Plains region, is one of the most Republican states in the nation. It has only gone Democratic in a presidential election seven times since statehood. Continuing on that trend, McCain won Nebraska by nearly 15 points. Obama was only able to win four counties: Douglas County, which contains Omaha; Lancaster County, which contains the state capital of Lincoln and the University of Nebraska; Saline County; and Thurston County, which contains a Native American reservation and was the only county to be won by John Kerry in 2004. No Democratic presidential nominee since Lyndon B. Johnson's landslide 1964 victory has ever won more than four counties in Nebraska. In 2008, McCain won Nebraska's 1st Congressional District and Nebraska's 3rd Congressional District by fairly safe margins, along with the state as a whole, but Obama managed to carry Nebraska's 2nd Congressional District, based in Omaha, by a slim margin of 1,260 votes, resulting in one of Nebraska's five electoral votes being awarded to Obama. This was a particularly notable win, because with Nebraska's split electoral vote system Obama became the first Democratic presidential candidate to win an electoral vote from Nebraska since 1964.

Obama did particularly well in the state's two most populated counties, Douglas and Lancaster. Obama was able to carve out small victories and became the first Democrat to carry those counties since 1964. As of the 2024 presidential election, this is the last election in which Saline County voted Democratic.

During the same election, Republicans held the open U.S. Senate seat vacated by Republican Chuck Hagel who retired. Former Republican Governor Mike Johanns easily defeated Democrat Scott Kleeb, a rancher, by 17.46 points. Johanns received 57.52% of the total vote while Kleeb took in 40.06%. At the state level, a candidate known to be a Republican picked up a seat in the nonpartisan and unicameral Nebraska Legislature in 2008.

== Results ==
2008 United States presidential election in Nebraska
Party	Candidate	Running mate	Votes	Percentage	Electoral votes
Republican	John McCain	Sarah Palin	452,979	56.53%	4
Democratic	Barack Obama	Joe Biden	333,319	41.60%	1
Independent	Ralph Nader	Matt Gonzalez	5,406	0.67%	0
Constitution	Chuck Baldwin	Darrell Castle	2,972	0.37%	0
Write-ins	Write-in candidates		2,837	0.35%	0
Libertarian	Bob Barr	Wayne Allyn Root	2,740	0.34%	0
Green	Cynthia McKinney	Rosa Clemente	1,028	0.13%	0
Totals			801,281	100.00%	5
Voter turnout			n/a		—

=== By county ===
County	John McCain Republican		Barack Obama Democratic		Various candidates Other parties		Margin		Total
County	#	%	#	%	#	%	#	%	Total
Adams	8,252	62.47%	4,685	35.47%	273	2.06%	3,567	27.00%	13,210
Antelope	2,383	74.82%	757	23.77%	45	1.41%	1,626	51.05%	3,185
Arthur	217	82.51%	39	14.83%	7	2.66%	178	67.68%	263
Banner	348	83.65%	62	14.90%	6	1.45%	286	68.75%	416
Blaine	266	84.18%	43	13.61%	7	2.21%	223	70.57%	316
Boone	2,042	72.00%	742	26.16%	52	1.84%	1,300	45.84%	2,836
Box Butte	2,932	58.89%	1,886	37.88%	161	3.23%	1,046	21.01%	4,979
Boyd	839	75.59%	250	22.52%	21	1.89%	589	53.07%	1,110
Brown	1,208	77.09%	311	19.85%	48	3.06%	897	57.24%	1,567
Buffalo	13,097	67.88%	5,867	30.41%	329	1.71%	7,230	37.47%	19,293
Burt	1,907	56.30%	1,413	41.72%	67	1.98%	494	14.58%	3,387
Butler	2,557	66.61%	1,190	31.00%	92	2.39%	1,367	35.61%	3,839
Cass	7,120	58.74%	4,753	39.21%	249	2.05%	2,367	19.53%	12,122
Cedar	2,912	69.77%	1,190	28.51%	72	1.72%	1,722	41.26%	4,174
Chase	1,477	80.10%	341	18.49%	26	1.41%	1,136	61.61%	1,844
Cherry	2,360	77.15%	599	19.58%	100	3.27%	1,761	57.57%	3,059
Cheyenne	3,572	73.82%	1,173	24.24%	94	1.94%	2,399	49.58%	4,839
Clay	2,177	71.78%	780	25.72%	76	2.50%	1,397	46.06%	3,033
Colfax	2,018	63.00%	1,125	35.12%	60	1.88%	893	27.88%	3,203
Cuming	2,732	66.85%	1,274	31.17%	81	1.98%	1,458	35.68%	4,087
Custer	4,301	77.11%	1,192	21.37%	85	1.52%	3,109	55.74%	5,578
Dakota	3,292	51.47%	2,994	46.81%	110	1.72%	298	4.66%	6,396
Dawes	2,376	62.94%	1,285	34.04%	114	3.02%	1,091	28.90%	3,775
Dawson	5,460	68.37%	2,399	30.04%	127	1.59%	3,061	38.33%	7,986
Deuel	732	73.72%	243	24.47%	18	1.81%	489	49.25%	993
Dixon	1,785	63.89%	946	33.86%	63	2.25%	839	30.03%	2,794
Dodge	8,557	55.03%	6,689	43.02%	304	1.95%	1,868	12.01%	15,550
Douglas	106,291	46.89%	116,810	51.53%	3,600	1.58%	-10,519	-4.64%	226,701
Dundy	783	76.84%	218	21.39%	18	1.77%	565	55.45%	1,019
Fillmore	1,913	64.91%	962	32.64%	72	2.45%	951	32.27%	2,947
Franklin	1,079	69.52%	442	28.48%	31	2.00%	637	41.04%	1,552
Frontier	1,034	73.65%	349	24.86%	21	1.49%	685	48.79%	1,404
Furnas	1,725	74.10%	556	23.88%	47	2.02%	1,169	50.22%	2,328
Gage	5,435	53.49%	4,473	44.03%	252	2.48%	962	9.46%	10,160
Garden	844	74.17%	283	24.87%	11	0.96%	561	49.30%	1,138
Garfield	800	77.67%	212	20.58%	18	1.75%	588	57.09%	1,030
Gosper	776	74.05%	260	24.81%	12	1.14%	516	49.24%	1,048
Grant	318	86.65%	41	11.17%	8	2.18%	277	75.48%	367
Greeley	715	59.63%	458	38.20%	26	2.17%	257	21.43%	1,199
Hall	12,977	61.01%	7,855	36.93%	439	2.06%	5,122	24.08%	21,271
Hamilton	3,389	70.62%	1,332	27.76%	78	1.62%	2,057	42.86%	4,799
Harlan	1,329	75.25%	402	22.76%	35	1.99%	927	52.49%	1,766
Hayes	461	83.36%	85	15.37%	7	1.27%	376	67.99%	553
Hitchcock	1,001	72.59%	346	25.09%	32	2.32%	655	47.50%	1,379
Holt	3,746	75.31%	1,089	21.89%	139	2.80%	2,657	53.42%	4,974
Hooker	355	81.05%	75	17.12%	8	1.83%	280	63.93%	438
Howard	1,847	61.65%	1,083	36.15%	66	2.20%	764	25.50%	2,996
Jefferson	2,103	56.88%	1,520	41.11%	74	2.01%	583	15.77%	3,697
Johnson	1,142	54.12%	914	43.32%	54	2.56%	228	10.80%	2,110
Kearney	2,224	70.60%	876	27.81%	50	1.59%	1,348	42.79%	3,150
Keith	2,942	74.14%	974	24.55%	52	1.31%	1,968	49.59%	3,968
Keya Paha	409	76.74%	115	21.58%	9	1.68%	294	55.16%	533
Kimball	1,346	74.32%	439	24.24%	26	1.44%	907	50.08%	1,811
Knox	2,728	66.80%	1,255	30.73%	101	2.47%	1,473	36.07%	4,084
Lancaster	59,398	46.59%	65,734	51.56%	2,358	1.85%	-6,336	-4.97%	127,490
Lincoln	10,817	66.46%	5,046	31.00%	414	2.54%	5,771	35.46%	16,277
Logan	327	78.61%	81	19.47%	8	1.92%	246	59.14%	416
Loup	302	76.84%	86	21.88%	5	1.28%	216	54.96%	393
Madison	9,655	68.74%	4,142	29.49%	248	1.77%	5,513	39.25%	14,045
McPherson	240	81.91%	45	15.36%	8	2.73%	195	66.55%	293
Merrick	2,375	69.22%	986	28.74%	70	2.04%	1,389	40.48%	3,431
Morrill	1,725	73.37%	557	23.69%	69	2.94%	1,168	49.68%	2,351
Nance	1,116	65.38%	549	32.16%	42	2.46%	567	33.22%	1,707
Nemaha	2,134	61.43%	1,240	35.69%	100	2.88%	894	25.74%	3,474
Nuckolls	1,498	67.45%	657	29.58%	66	2.97%	841	37.87%	2,221
Otoe	4,033	56.87%	2,915	41.10%	144	2.03%	1,118	15.77%	7,092
Pawnee	859	62.07%	483	34.90%	42	3.03%	376	27.17%	1,384
Perkins	1,092	76.90%	310	21.83%	18	1.27%	782	55.07%	1,420
Phelps	3,360	75.12%	1,050	23.47%	63	1.41%	2,310	51.65%	4,473
Pierce	2,385	73.93%	783	24.27%	58	1.80%	1,602	49.66%	3,226
Platte	9,373	69.84%	3,796	28.29%	251	1.87%	5,577	41.55%	13,420
Polk	1,822	71.65%	668	26.27%	53	2.08%	1,154	45.38%	2,543
Red Willow	3,735	74.05%	1,216	24.11%	93	1.84%	2,519	49.94%	5,044
Richardson	2,342	59.02%	1,513	38.13%	113	2.85%	829	20.89%	3,968
Rock	640	79.90%	139	17.35%	22	2.75%	501	62.55%	801
Saline	2,434	46.35%	2,674	50.92%	143	2.73%	-240	-4.57%	5,251
Sarpy	38,816	57.06%	28,010	41.18%	1,196	1.76%	10,806	15.88%	68,022
Saunders	6,188	60.60%	3,767	36.89%	257	2.51%	2,421	23.71%	10,212
Scotts Bluff	9,708	65.91%	4,745	32.21%	277	1.88%	4,963	33.70%	14,730
Seward	4,647	61.72%	2,703	35.90%	179	2.38%	1,944	25.82%	7,529
Sheridan	1,941	78.84%	454	18.44%	67	2.72%	1,487	60.40%	2,462
Sherman	950	60.43%	585	37.21%	37	2.36%	365	23.22%	1,572
Sioux	603	82.38%	117	15.98%	12	1.64%	486	66.40%	732
Stanton	1,781	71.38%	664	26.61%	50	2.01%	1,117	44.77%	2,495
Thayer	1,749	65.78%	860	32.34%	50	1.88%	889	33.44%	2,659
Thomas	331	84.87%	51	13.08%	8	2.05%	280	71.79%	390
Thurston	972	45.72%	1,120	52.68%	34	1.60%	-148	-6.96%	2,126
Valley	1,657	68.39%	706	29.14%	60	2.47%	951	39.25%	2,423
Washington	6,425	62.26%	3,711	35.96%	184	1.78%	2,714	26.30%	10,320
Wayne	2,503	65.73%	1,249	32.80%	56	1.47%	1,254	32.93%	3,808
Webster	1,233	67.86%	552	30.38%	32	1.76%	681	37.48%	1,817
Wheeler	334	75.91%	96	21.82%	10	2.27%	238	54.09%	440
York	4,848	73.81%	1,607	24.47%	113	1.72%	3,241	49.34%	6,568
Totals	452,979	56.53%	333,319	41.60%	14,983	1.87%	119,660	14.93%	801,281

Counties that flipped from Republican to Democratic

- Douglas (largest city: Omaha)
- Lancaster (largest city: Lincoln)
- Saline (largest city: Crete)

=== By congressional district ===
McCain carried two of the state's three congressional districts, while Barack Obama carried one congressional district held by a Republican.

District	McCain		Obama		Other		Representative
District	#	%	#	%	#	%	Representative
1st	148,179	54.10%	121,411	44.33%	4,303	1.57%	Jeff Fortenberry
2nd	135,439	48.75%	138,809	49.97%	3,561	1.28%	Lee Terry
3rd	169,361	68.64%	73,099	29.63%	4,282	1.73%	Adrian Smith

== Electors ==
Technically the voters of Nebraska cast their ballots for electors: representatives to the Electoral College. Nebraska is allocated 5 electors because it has 3 congressional districts and 2 senators. All candidates who appear on the ballot or qualify to receive write-in votes must submit a list of 5 electors, who pledge to vote for their candidate and his or her running mate. Whoever wins the majority of votes in the state is awarded 2 electoral votes, and the other 3 are allocated via the individual results of the congressional districts. Their chosen electors then vote for president and vice president. Although electors are pledged to their candidate and running mate, they are not obligated to vote for them. An elector who votes for someone other than his or her candidate is known as a faithless elector.

The electors of each state and the District of Columbia met on December 15, 2008, to cast their votes for president and vice president. The Electoral College itself never meets as one body. Instead the electors from each state and the District of Columbia met in their respective capitols.

The following were the 5 members of the Electoral College from the state. 4 of the electors were pledged to John McCain and Sarah Palin; 2 at large, 1 for each of the 1st and 3rd Congressional districts. 1 was pledged to Barack Obama and Joe Biden:

- Charles Thone is an elector for Nebraska's 1st congressional district pledged to John McCain and Sarah Palin.
- William Forsee is an elector for Nebraska's 2nd congressional district pledged to Barack Obama and Joe Biden.
- D. Neal Smith is an elector for Nebraska's 3rd congressional district pledged to John McCain and Sarah Palin.
- Norman Riffel is an at-large elector pledged to John McCain and Sarah Palin.
- Patricia Dorwart is an at-large elector pledged to John McCain and Sarah Palin.

== See also ==
- United States presidential elections in Nebraska
- Presidency of Barack Obama
