= Daniel Hesse =

American CEO

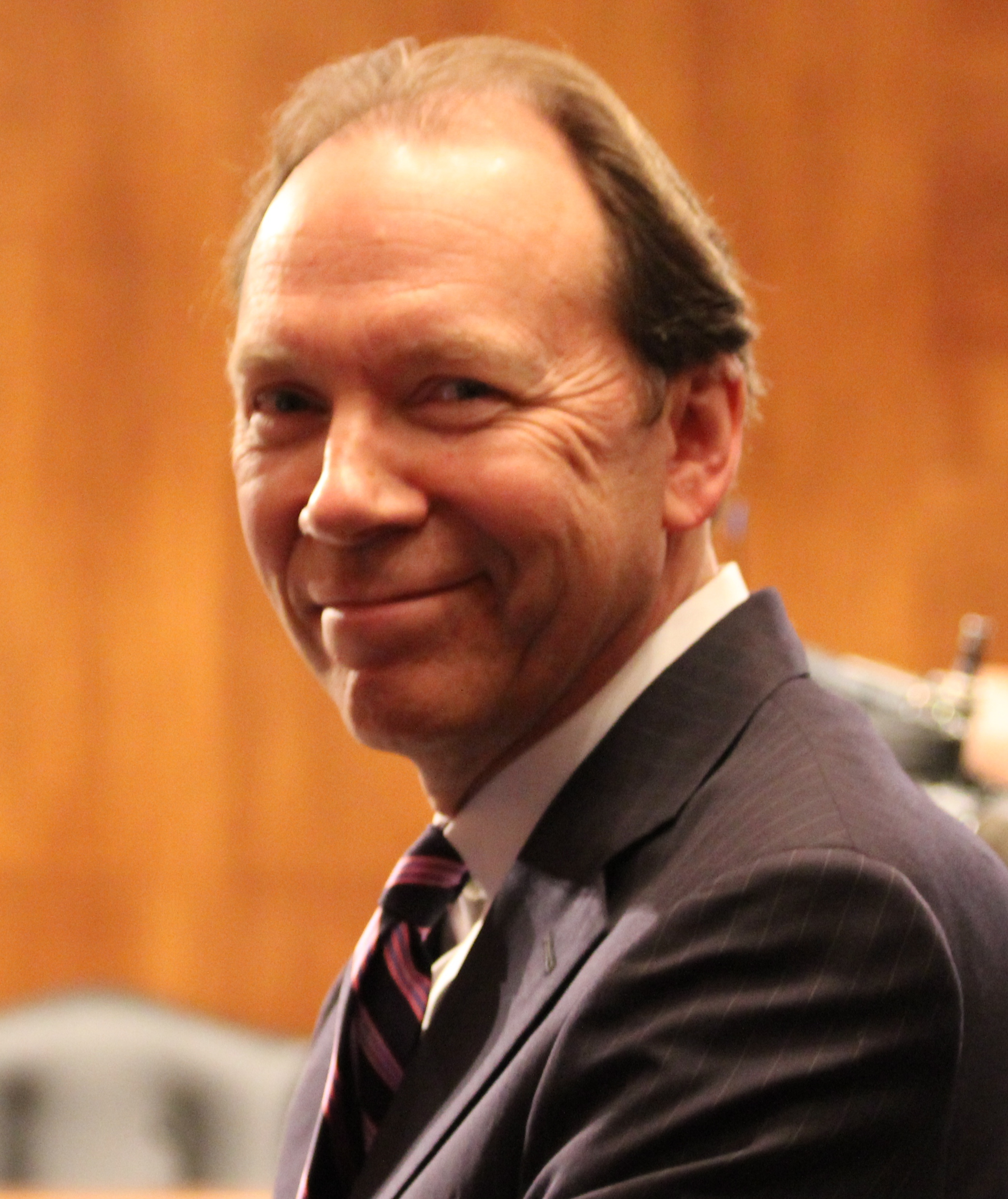
- Hesse in Solomon R. Guggenheim Museum.
- Born: 1953 (age 72–73)
- Education: University of Notre Dame (B.A.); Cornell University (M.B.A.); MIT Sloan School of Management (M.S.)
- Predecessor: Gary D. Forsee
- Successor: Marcelo Claure
- Board member of: PNC Financial Services; Boys and Girls Clubs of America; Akamai Technologies; The JUST Capital Foundation

Daniel R. Hesse (born c. 1953) is the former chief executive officer of Sprint Corporation.

In January 2016, Hesse joined the board of directors for PNC Financial Services where he chairs the Technology Subcommittee. He was elected to the board of directors for Akamai Technologies in August 2016 and named as chairman in June 2021.

On October 20, 2022, Hesse was inducted into the Wireless Hall of Fame for his contributions to the wireless industry and efforts in sustainability and corporate responsibility.

== Early life and education ==
Hesse's father was a career army officer. As a result, Hesse attended 10 total schools, beginning with first grade in Italy and graduating from Stuttgart American High School in Germany. He received a bachelor's degree from the University of Notre Dame in government and international studies in 1975, an MBA from the Johnson Graduate School of Management at Cornell University in 1977, and Master's of Science from the MIT Sloan School of Management as a Sloan Fellow in 1989.

== Career ==
=== AT&T ===
Hesse spent 23 years at AT&T where he started out as an intern.

From 1991 to 1995, he was president and CEO of AT&T Network Systems International based in the Netherlands.

He launched the online division's AT&T Worldnet service in February 1996, which introduced unlimited internet dial up for $20/month for subscribers to AT&T's long-distance services.

In May 1997, he became chief executive officer of AT&T Wireless. In 1998, Hesse oversaw the launch of AT&T's Digital One Rate. During this time, Hesse was named 1998's Wireless Industry Person of the Year RCR Magazine.

=== Terabeam Corporation ===
From March 2000 to June 2004, Hesse was CEO and chairman of Terabeam Corporation.

=== Embarq Corporation ===
In June 2005, Hesse joined Sprint and oversaw the spinoff of its landline division into a separate public company– Embarq Corporation. Hesse was the president and CEO of Embarq from May 2006 until December 2007.

=== Sprint ===
Hesse was named CEO of Sprint Nextel on December 17, 2007.

During his tenure, Hesse appeared in ten television commercials for the company. The black and white ads, created by Goodby, Silverstein & Partners, were filmed in New York City.

Hesse joined Sprint as the company was losing customers following the merger with Nextel. His strategy to stem further losses included improved customer service, an increased emphasis on prepaid cell phones, a deal with Apple to sell iPhones, and a 4G presence investment/ownership stake in WiMAX-provider Clearwire. He also added retail stores across the nation in an attempt for increased in-person customer service.

During Hesse's tenure, Sprint went from last place to first in the wireless industry in customer satisfaction according to JD Power and the American Customer Satisfaction Index (ACSI). During this period, Sprint was recognized 20 times for excellence in customer service by JD Power. In 2014, the ACSI recognized Sprint as the most improved US company in customer satisfaction over the previous six years among all 43 industries studied. During his last two full calendar years as CEO, Sprint's total shareholder return ranked #1 among all S&P 500 companies.

Corporate Responsibility Magazine recognized Hesse with the Corporate Responsibility Lifetime Achievement Award in 2013. Hesse was also named a Top Rated CEO on Glassdoor and one of five "Best Turnaround CEOs of All Time" by Fierce Wireless." The American India Foundation honored Hesse for Excellence in Corporate Leadership and Philanthropy in 2014.

Hesse led the acquisition of 80 percent of Sprint by Softbank in July 2013 and remained for a year to complete the transition. On August 6, 2014 Sprint announced that Hesse would be succeeded by Marcelo Claure, founder of Brightstar Corporation.

Hesse is on the boards of directors for the following organizations:

- The National Board of Governors of the Boys & Girls Clubs of America
- The JUST Capital Foundation
- PNC Financial Services, where Hesse chairs the Technology Subcommittee
- Akamai Technologies, chairman, board member

Business positions
Preceded by Gary D. Forsee	Sprint CEO; 2007–2014	Succeeded by Marcelo Claure
