= Steve Owens (Missouri) =

Steve Owens (born c. 1955) is an attorney and higher education leader. After serving in private practice with a large Kansas City--based law firm, he joined the University of Missouri System as General Counsel 2008. The UM System, headquartered in Columbia, Missouri, includes four doctoral granting public research universities and a fully integrated academic medical center. He served as Interim President of the UM System from January 2011 to February 2012 and then returned to his previous position as General Counsel. Later, he was named Interim Chancellor of the System’s flagship university, the University of Missouri-Columbia, and served in that position from November 2013 to February 2014 after which he again returned to his previous position as General Counsel.

Among the events that occurred on his watch as president was the decision in 2011 for the university system's flagship school, the University of Missouri in Columbia, to move from the Big 12 Conference (which it had a relationship from its predecessor in 1907) to the Southeastern Conference.

== Early life ==
Owens was born in Kansas City, Missouri and attended Glendale High School in Springfield, Missouri, where he was student body president. He was the third generation of his family to attend the University of Missouri. While at MU he was a member of the varsity tennis team and tapped into honor societies QEBH and Omicron Delta Kappa.

After graduating from the University of Missouri in 1977 with a BS in Public Administration, Owens attended Wake Forest University School of Law. He received his JD in 1980 and then clerked for the Honorable William Robert Collinson, United States Judge for the Western District of Missouri.

In 1981 Owens joined the Kansas City, Missouri law firm Stinson, Mag, & Fizzell (now Stinson LLP). While at the law firm, he was named partner; served on the firm's board of directors and its executive committee; and chaired the firm's litigation department and its complex litigation and class action division. He has been selected for "The Best Lawyers in America" and "The Kansas and Missouri Super Lawyers" peer listings and he has Martindale Hubble's highest ratings (AV Preeminent) for competence and ethics. As part of his private practice, Owens and law partner Robert Lattinville launched a sports law group that grew to include Norm Stewart, Rick Majerus, Cheryl Burnett, Jackie Stiles and others as clients. Owens and Lattinville were designated "Preferred Counsel" by the Women Basketball Coaches Association.

== University of Missouri ==
In January 2008, Owens became General Counsel for the University of Missouri System. When university president Gary D. Forsee unexpectedly announced his resignation to care for his sick wife, Owens was appointed Interim President of the university in January 2011.

During the time Owens was Interim President, the university faced an 8% reduction in state support and a projected $42 million revenue shortfall, but balanced its $2.7 billion budget and provided faculty and staff with their first pay raise in three years. Also during Owens' tenure, the university's 50-year-old pension plan was reformed; student enrollment continued to grow; and the academic credentials of incoming student continued to improve. He also expanded the University's ethics hotline and promulgated a rule reiterating academic freedom for faculty and protecting classroom discussions for students.

In 2011, while Owens was Interim President, the longstanding and lucrative relationship between the University of Missouri-Columbia and the Big 12 athletic conference was thrown into turmoil after Texas A&M University announced it was moving to the SEC and the University of Oklahoma announced it would explore its options to realign with another athletic conference (the University of Nebraska and University of Colorado had left the year before). Looking to get stability for its athletic program and budget, Owens worked with the university's governing board and campus leaders to move the school to the SEC. The university became a member of the SEC effective July 1, 2012.

In November 2013, Owens was named Interim Chancellor of the University of Missouri-Columbia ("MU"), a comprehensive research university with over 30,000 students, several graduate and professional schools and a fully integrated academic medical center. MU is a member of the Association of American Universities (AAU). As Interim Chancellor he prepared a billion dollar budget and stabilized an executive leadership team following the recent retirements and resignations of the Chancellor, Provost, two Vice Chancellors and a unit Director. Also during his tenure, his previous work in moving MU to the SEC came to fruition. The football team reached the SEC championship game and won the Cotton Bowl, and Owens served as head of the official delegations.

As General Counsel, Owens oversees the UM System’s Office of the General Counsel. The OGC consists of 15 lawyers and 5 support staff members, and it is responsible for hiring and monitoring outside counsel. During his time as General Counsel, Owens has emphasized greater client service and increased productivity through quality hiring, office reorganization, subject matter specialization and greater use of technology. He is a member of the National Association of College and University Attorneys (NACUA), an organization consisting of over 1,600 institutional and 5,000 individual attorney members. He has been named to the NACUA’s Board of Directors twice and served on its four-member Executive Committee and as its Treasurer.

On December 2, 2021, Owens announced he would step down as General Counsel of the University effective March 1, 2022. He will join the Husch Blackwell law firm in his hometown of Kansas City. After his announcement, the University's governing board passed a resolution honoring Owens for his achievements and granting him the title of General Counsel Emeritus. In February 2022, the Stephen J. Owens Conference Room was named after him in historic Jesse Hall.

Academic offices
Preceded by Gary D. Forsee	President of the University of Missouri System (interim); 2011–2012	Succeeded by Timothy M. Wolfe
