= William Esrey =

American businessman

William T. Esrey (born 1940 in Philadelphia, Pennsylvania) is an American businessman, who was Chief Executive of Sprint Corporation.

== Biography ==
Esrey attended Swarthmore College in 1957, Denison University in 1961, and graduated from Harvard Business School in 1964.

Esrey began his career in telecommunications in 1964 with AT&T. After becoming the youngest executive officer in the history of the company, Esrey left in 1970, joining investment banking firm Dillon, Read & Co. in New York City where after one year he became a managing director. At this point he considered turning his back on business and going to medical school, but eventually decided to stay in business.

=== Sprint Telecom ===
In 1980, Esrey joined United Telecommunications as the executive vice president of corporate planning. In 1982, he became president of United Telecom Communications Inc., later named US Telecom. In 1985, Esrey was made president and CEO of United Telecommunications. In 1990, he became chairman of the company, which had now changed its name to Sprint. During his time in charge of Sprint, the company developed from a rural telephone company into a multibillion-dollar international corporation. Esrey was chairman of Sprint and United Telecom from 1990 to May 2003. He received several honors and awards, and was named by Business Week as one of the top 25 business leaders in the world. In 1999, the board agreed to a merger with WorldCom, which failed due to antitrust concerns.

=== Tax ===
During his time as CEO and chairman with Sprint, Esrey was paid an average of $25.5million per annum, including cash, bonuses and stock options. Most of this "income" was in stock options whose value was not realized due to the tech crash in 2000. Esrey earned a seven-figure salary, with annual bonuses ranging from $220,000 to $1.38 million.

=== Other positions ===
Esrey held positions as:

- The Equitable Life Assurance Society of the United States - Director
- General Mills - Director, since 1989
- Japan Telecom - Chairman
- Panhandle Eastern Corp - director
- Sprint Corporation - Chairman Emeritus

He was chairman of The Business Council from 2001 to 2002.

He was a trustee of the University of Kansas City, a trustee of the U.S. Ski and Snowboard Team Foundation, a director of the Heart of America United Way and the NCAA Foundation.

== Personal life ==
Esrey is married with two children.

Business positions
Preceded by Paul Harry Henson	Sprint CEO; 1985-2003; Originally United Telecommunications	Succeeded by Gary Forsee
