= Sharon Fries-Britt =

American academic

Sharon L. Fries-Britt
- Born: 1959?

Academic background
- Education: University of Maryland, College Park
- Thesis: (1994)

Academic work
- Discipline: Higher education, Minority studies
- Institutions: University of Maryland, College Park, Department of Counseling, Higher Education, and Special Education

Sharon L. Fries-Britt (born 1959?) is a professor of higher education at the University of Maryland, College Park.

== Academic career ==
Fries-Britt received her PhD in 1994 from the University of Maryland, College Park where she now serves as a professor in the Department of Counseling, Higher Education, and Special Education. She was a fellow at the Consortium on Race, Gender, and Ethnicity at the University of Maryland. She was one of the research fellows on a $2.5 million grant for "broadening participation in physics" from the National Society of Black Physicists.

== Investigations and reports ==
In 2018 she was invited with Adrianna Kezar to investigate and report on the "highly visible racial crisis in the 2015–16 academic year" at the University of Missouri. Stella M. Flores of New York University's Steinhardt Institute for Higher Education Policy commended the study at a time "when the nation and our colleges and universities are facing unprecedented demographic change, but faculty and leadership have not changed nearly as fast in terms of representation."

She serves on the American Institute of Physics National Task Force to Elevate African American Representation in Undergraduate Physics & Astronomy (TEAM-UP). After a two-year investigation, this group released a call for a $50 million program to increase the number of African-American physics and astronomy degree recipients in the US, at 3% in 2020.

== Awards ==
She received the 2011 Mentoring Award for "noteworthy contributions" to "mentoring developing scholars" from the Association for the Study of Higher Education. In 2020 she received an Alumni Excellence award for "transformational" research from the University of Maryland Alumni Association.

== Selected publications ==
- Fries-Britt, Sharon; Turner, Bridget (2002). "Uneven Stories: Successful Black Collegians at a Black and a White Campus". The Review of Higher Education. 25 (3). Johns Hopkins University Press: 315–330. doi:10.1353/rhe.2002.0012. S2CID 145223610.
- Fries-Britt, Sharon L; Turner, Bridget (September 2001). "Facing stereotypes: A case study of Black students on a White campus". Journal of College Student Development. 42 (5). ACPA Executive Office: 420–429. ISSN 0897-5264.
- Fries-Britt, Sharon; Griffin, Kimberly (September–October 2007). "The Black Box: How High-Achieving Blacks Resist Stereotypes About Black Americans". Journal of College Student Development. 48 (5). Johns Hopkins University Press: 509–524. doi:10.1353/csd.2007.0048. S2CID 145356280.
- Fries-Britt, Sharon (November 2016). "Moving beyond Black Achiever Isolation". The Journal of Higher Education. 69 (5): 556–576. doi:10.1080/00221546.1998.11775151.
- Fries-Britt, Sharon; Holmes, Kimberly M. (5 January 2012). "Prepared and Progressing: Black Women in Physics". In Sharpe and Chambers, Rhonda V. and Crystal Renee (ed.). Black female undergraduates on campus : successes and challenges. Emerald Group Publishing Limited. pp. 199–218. ISBN 9781780525037.
- Kezar, Adrianna; Fries-Britt, Sharon (2018). Speaking Truth and Acting with Integrity: Confronting Challenges of Campus Racial Climate (PDF). American Council on Education.
