= Gary D. Forsee =

American academic administrator (born 1950)

Gary D. Forsee (born 1950) was the chairman and chief executive officer of Sprint Nextel Corporation (2003–2007), and president of the University of Missouri System from 2007 to 2011. Forsee resides in Columbia, Missouri, the headquarters of the UM System.

== Early life ==
Forsee was born in Kansas City, Missouri, and received a B.S. from the Missouri University of Science and Technology in 1972. While there he became a member of Kappa Sigma fraternity, and in, 2009, he received the "Man of the Year Award" from Kappa Sigma, in recognition of his exemplary leadership.

== Sprint and Sprint Nextel ==
Gary Forsee succeeded William Esrey as CEO of Sprint in 2004. During his first year, he led a dramatic rise in Sprint's performance and stock price and negotiated the Sprint Nextel merger, earning him the honor of being named one of the "Best Managers" of 2004 by Business Week magazine. Together with Nextel Communications' CEO, Tim Donahue, Forsee merged the two companies in 2005 and spun off its land line business to Embarq in 2006.

The merger was intended to bring together two strong brands, Sprint in consumer cellular and Nextel in business cellular, but the so-called "synergies" expected from the merger never materialized. Instead, the diverse cultures of the two companies led to internal clashes between former Sprint and Nextel employees and the resulting internal conflict led to serious customer service issues. Combined with network troubles plaguing the company from both legacy networks, Sprint Nextel soon found itself bleeding subscribers and facing ever-lowering monthly subscriber revenue (a.k.a. "ARPU," or average revenue per unit.)

In 2007 Sprint took considerable heat after it terminated contracts of 1,000 of its 53 million customers who it said were making 40 to 50 calls a month complaining about the service, while customers exited both of Sprint Nextel's wireless networks in droves.

Forsee was ousted after Sprint lost 337,000 customers in the third quarter of 2007, and a little over six months later the company wrote off $31 billion related to the merger—essentially writing off three quarters of $42 billion Nextel's market capitalization value as of the time of the merger.

Forsee was awarded a severance package that ChiefExecutive.net described as "exceptional:" Forsee's severance package added up to over $40 million, including a $1.5 million salary through 2009, $5 million in bonuses, stock options and restricted shares worth $23 million and an $84,000-a-month pension for life.

== University of Missouri ==
After resigning from Sprint Nextel, Forsee accepted a position as the 22nd president of the four-campus University of Missouri System on December 20, 2007. He succeeded Gordon H. Lamb, who had been in the position since April 2007. Forsee began his duties Feb. 18, 2008. After taking an extended leave beginning in December 2010 to care for his wife, Sherry, who was diagnosed with cancer, Forsee announced his immediate resignation to the UM board of curators on January 7, 2011.

== Timeline ==
- 2008–2011: president, University of Missouri System
- 2005–2007: president & chief executive officer, Sprint Nextel Corporation
- 2002–2005: vice chairman of Domestic Operations, BellSouth Corporation
- 2002: chairman, Cingular Wireless
- 2000–2002: BellSouth International
  - 2000–2002: president
  - 1999–2000: executive vice president & chief staff officer
- 1998–1999: president & chief executive, Global One
- (?–1998): vice president of sales, AT&T's federal systems division

Business positions
Preceded by William Esrey	Sprint CEO; 2003-2007	Succeeded by Dan Hesse

Academic offices
Preceded by Elson S. Floyd	President of the University of Missouri System; 2008–2011	Succeeded by Steve Owens (2011-12 - Interim); Timothy M. Wolfe
