= Likewize =

American company

Likewize Corp.
- Type: Private
- Industry: Technology; Device Protection; Telecommunications; Retail; Financial Services
- Founded: 1997; 29 years ago
- Headquarters: Dallas, Texas, United States
- Key people: Rod Millar (CEO)
- Services: Device Protection, Warranty, Repairs, Trade-ins, Recycling, Premium Tech Support
- Revenue: US $1.2 billion (2023)
- Owner: Genstar Capital; Brightstar Capital Partners
- Number of employees: 2,000
- Website: likewize.com

Likewize (formerly Brightstar Corp.) is a privately held American corporation founded in 1997 that operates in over 30 countries today. The company offers insurance, warranty, repair, trade-in, recycling, and tech support to telcos, banks, carriers and retailers on smartphones, tablets, laptops and connected devices in the home.

In 2023 Likewize was recognized at the Mobile Industry Awards for the 3rd consecutive year as the best mobile/gadget insurance provider in the industry.

== History ==
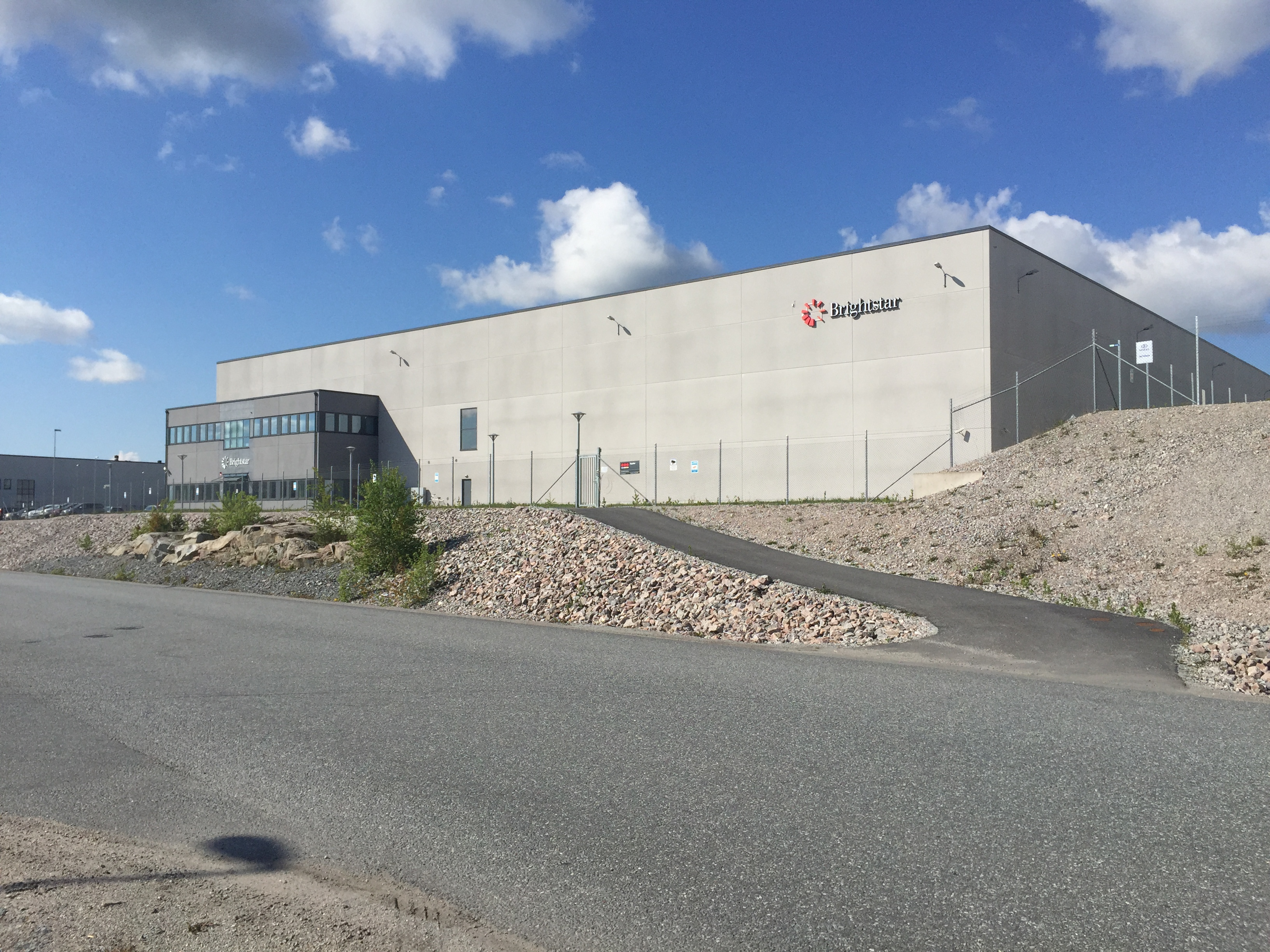
A Brightstar warehouse in Sweden

Likewize began operations as Brightstar Corp and was founded by Marcelo Claure in 1997.

Brightstar Corp acquired eSecuritel, an Alpharetta, GA based cell phone insurance provider, from Mainsail Partners in April, 2011.

In October 2013, Japanese SoftBank paid $1.26 billion for a 57% stake in Brightstar.

In February 2014, Brightstar Corp. completed its acquisition of 20:20 Mobile, a European mobile provider.

In July 2014, Brightstar Corp. and Bharti Enterprises announced that they entered into an agreement to have Brightstar acquire a majority stake in Beetel Teletech, a Bharti company.

Previous logo when the entity was known as Brightstar Corp.

In February 2015, Jaymin Patel was appointed CEO of the company, replacing Claure.

In June 2018, Brightstar acquired Next Wireless Group, an online seller of used smartphones. In August 2018, Jaymin Patel resigned as CEO of the company. Reza Taleghani, Brightstar's CFO became interim CEO of the company. As of June 2019, Rod Millar is CEO of the company.

In November 2019, Brightstar acquired Risk Insure which will enable Brightstar "to broaden its portfolio in the wireless industry."

In April 2020, the company acquired WeFix. Then in September of the same year, SoftBank sold the company to Brightstar Capital Partners for an undisclosed amount.

In September 2021, the company announced it was rebranding to reflect a new direction. Under the new name “Likewize,” the company on focused on its Protect, Repair, Upgrade and Support capabilities, showcasing its move to provide a range of tech services, in-store and come-to-you repair, recycling and support.

In November 2022, the company announced that Genstar Capital would be joining Likewize’s existing private equity investor, Brightstar Capital Partners, in leading the company’s next phase of growth.

The company's headquarters are located in Dallas, Texas.
