= William Forsee =

American politician

- Occupation: Political activist
- Political party: Democrat

William Forsee is a Democratic political activist from Nebraska, who served as a presidential elector during the 2008 election.

A high school biology/anatomy teacher, In 2008, Forsee became the first elector from Nebraska in 44 years (since 1964) to cast a vote for Democratic nominees (Senator Barack Obama from Illinois for President and Senator Joe Biden of Delaware for Vice President).

Nebraska split electoral votes (as Maine does) between winners at-large and congressional districts. Republican nominee John McCain won Nebraska at-large and all but one congressional district, but Obama carried Nebraska's 2nd congressional district and thus Forsee became first Nebraska elector in history to legally cast his vote (unlike faithless electors) for another candidate than the rest of his fellow electors.

Forsee along with his wife Carol have lived in Bellevue, Nebraska for 35 years.
