= Tim Wolfe =

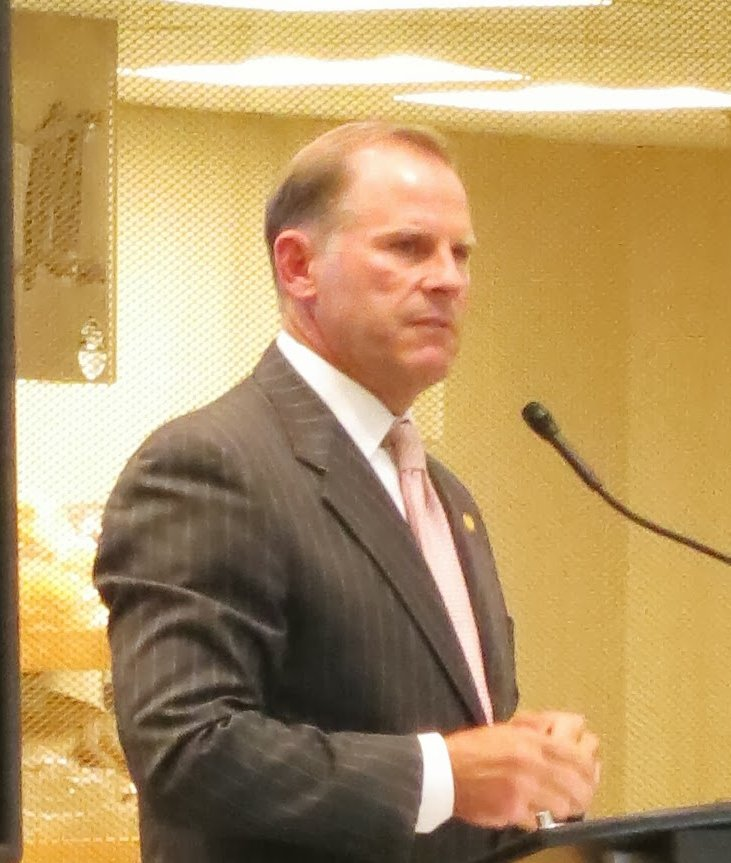
- Wolfe speaks out against House Bill 253 at the University of Missouri in September 2013

10th President of the University of Missouri System
- In office February 15, 2012 – November 9, 2015
- Preceded by: Gary D. Forsee
- Succeeded by: Mun Choi

Personal details
- Born: Timothy Michael Wolfe; August 31, 1958 (age 67) Iowa City, Iowa, U.S.
- Spouse: Molly Wolfe
- Children: 2
- Education: University of Missouri; Harvard University

Timothy Michael Wolfe (born August 31, 1958) is a former president of the University of Missouri System. His tenure lasted from February 15, 2012 to November 9, 2015, and ended amid controversy surrounding race relations at the university.

== Early life ==
Wolfe was born in Iowa City, Iowa, and moved to Columbia, Missouri, when he was in fourth grade. He was quarterback of the Rock Bridge High School team that won the class 3A Missouri state high school football championship in 1975.

His father was a communications instructor at the University of Missouri from 1967 to 1997 and his mother taught in the Columbia school system from 1968 to 1972 before going on to teach at the Massachusetts School of Law.

He matriculated at the University of Missouri, earning a bachelor's degree in personnel management from the Trulaske College of Business in 1980. While an undergraduate, he was a member of the Beta Theta Pi fraternity. Wolfe interned for Cramer Products for eighteen months, and he was on the business school's Dean's List. In 1995, Wolfe completed Harvard Business School's Advanced Management Program.

== Computer business career ==
In 1980, he became a sales representative in Jefferson City, Missouri for IBM. He worked in various capacities for IBM for twenty years. Wolfe subsequently worked for Covansys as an executive vice president.

In 2003, he began working for Novell Americas, where he served as vice president and general manager of the Southeast region. Three years later, he began overseeing the East region instead. Wolfe was promoted to president of Novell Americas in October 2007, overseeing Novell's operations in the Americas. Novell was acquired in 2010 by Attachmate.

== University of Missouri ==
The announcement of his selection occurred on December 13, 2011, nearly 11 months after the previous president Gary Forsee stepped down to take care of his ailing wife. Wolfe took office on February 15, 2012. Steve Owens had been interim president. The appointment marked the second consecutive time that a businessman rather than educator became president (Forsee was CEO of Sprint). Wolfe said he hoped he would serve in the position for a long time before he finally retired. Wolfe said that he did not expect the university system's financial troubles would be difficult compared to the financial situations of some of his previous employers.

Wolfe's initial contract called for a $450,000 annual salary and $100,000 in bonus potential. He also received free housing and a car or car allowance. He lived in Columbia on university grounds at Providence Point (although he said initially his family would continue to live at their home outside of Boston, Massachusetts.

The editorial board of the St. Louis Post-Dispatch criticized the University of Missouri's board of curators for hiring someone with no professional experience in educational settings who needed a two-month "journey of enlightenment" to learn about each of the four campuses' needs.

=== University of Missouri Press ===
In May 2012, Wolfe announced that the University of Missouri Press' $400,000 subsidy would end. Two months later, he announced that the press would close and that there would be a new publishing model that would be more effective at distributing scholarly publications. The publishing staff said that the new publishing model described what they were already doing. Wolfe said he did not know how much the new model would cost and that he had not spoken to any employees at the press before making his decision.

In October 2012, it was announced that the University of Missouri Press would not close after all. Wolfe said that he always intended to increase the cost-effectiveness of the press and that it was never the plan to close the press. He said that he should have spoken to more press employees, authors, and other publishers earlier in the decision-making process.

=== Funding cuts ===
In 2013, the Missouri House of Representatives passed a bill to cut funding to elementary schools, middle schools, high schools, colleges, and universities, and impose sales tax on purchases of college textbooks. Governor Jay Nixon vetoed the bill. Wolfe said he agreed with the governor's veto because decreases to individual income tax rates should not be financed by cutting education.

=== Racial controversy and resignation ===
In 2015, Wolfe was the subject of criticism from a variety of groups over his perceived failure to address a series of alleged racist incidents at the University of Missouri. Drawing condemnation from black student organizations. In November 2015, Missouri's Legion of Black Collegians announced that approximately thirty athletes would not participate in any team activities unless Wolfe resigned.

On November 9, 2015, Wolfe resigned at a special Board of Curators meeting that morning. In a statement, he said, "My motivation in making this decision comes from a love of Columbia where I grew up and the state of Missouri. I thought and prayed over this decision. It is the right thing to do. ... The frustration and anger I see is real and I don't doubt it for a second. ... I take full responsibility for the actions that have occurred. I have asked everybody to use my resignation to heal. Let's focus in changing what we can change today and in the future, not what we can't change in the past."

Academic offices
Preceded by Gary D. Forsee; Steve Owens (interim 2011-12)	President of the University of Missouri System; February 15, 2012 – November 9, 2015	Succeeded by Mun Choi
