= List of Frontier Communications operating companies =

Frontier Communications owns local telephone operating companies consisting of companies it has owned under its previous name Citizens Communications Company, companies it acquired from Global Crossing, and companies it acquired from Verizon Communications which are grouped under its subsidiary Frontier Communications ILEC Holdings. The companies operate in largely rural areas (with a few exceptions).

On September 5, 2024 Verizon announced that it will acquire Frontier Communications for $20 billion. This acquisition was completed on January 20, 2026. As a result, Verizon took control of Frontier's operations, including all of its operating companies.

== Listing by state ==
The following lists breaks down the companies in each state that Frontier provides service to. Each company has been acquired by Citizens Utilities, which later changed its name to Frontier, since the 1980s.

=== Alabama ===
- Frontier Communications of Alabama (Global Crossing, 2001)
- Frontier Communications of Lamar County (Global Crossing, 2001)
- Frontier Communications of the South (Global Crossing, 2001)

=== Arizona ===
- Citizens Telecommunications Company of the White Mountains (GTE)
- Citizens Utilities Rural Company
- Frontier Communications of the Southwest (Verizon, 2010)
- Navajo Communications Company (ALLTEL)

=== California ===
- Citizens Telecommunications Company of California Inc. (GTE)
- Frontier California Inc. (Verizon, 2016)
- Frontier Communications of the Southwest (Verizon, 2010)

=== Connecticut ===
- Frontier Communications of Connecticut (The Southern New England Telephone Company) (AT&T, 2014)

=== Florida ===
- Frontier Communications of the South (Global Crossing, 2001)

=== Georgia ===
- Frontier Communications of Fairmount (Global Crossing, 2001)
- Frontier Communications of Georgia (Global Crossing, 2001)

=== Illinois ===
- Citizens Telecommunications Company of Illinois (GTE)
- Frontier Communications - Midland (Global Crossing, 2001)
- Frontier Communications - Prairie (Global Crossing, 2001)
- Frontier Communications - Schuyler (Global Crossing, 2001)
- Frontier Communications of DePue (Global Crossing, 2001)
- Frontier Communications of Illinois (Global Crossing, 2001)
- Frontier Communications of Lakeside (Global Crossing, 2001)
- Frontier Communications of Mt. Pulaski (Global Crossing, 2001)
- Frontier Communications of Orion (Global Crossing, 2001)
- Frontier Communications of the Carolinas (Verizon, 2010)
- Frontier North (Verizon, 2010)

=== Indiana ===
- Frontier Communications of Indiana (Global Crossing, 2001)
- Frontier Communications of Thorntown (Global Crossing, 2001)
- Frontier Midstates (Verizon, 2010)
- Frontier North (Verizon, 2010)

=== Iowa ===
- Frontier Communications of Iowa (Global Crossing, 2001)

=== Michigan ===
- Frontier Communications of Michigan (Global Crossing, 2001)
- Frontier Midstates (Verizon, 2010)
- Frontier North (Verizon, 2010)

=== Minnesota ===
- Citizens Telecommunications Company of Minnesota (GTE)
- Frontier Communications of Minnesota (Global Crossing, 2001)

=== Mississippi ===
- Frontier Communications of Mississippi (Global Crossing, 2001)

=== Nebraska ===
- Citizens Telecommunications Company of Nebraska (GTE)

=== Nevada ===
- Citizens Telecommunications Company of Nevada (ALLTEL)
- Frontier Communications of the Southwest (Verizon, 2010)

=== New Mexico ===
- Navajo Communications Company (ALLTEL)

=== New York ===
- Citizens Telecommunications Company of New York (GTE)
- Frontier Communications of AuSable Valley (Global Crossing, 2001)
- Frontier Communications of Seneca-Gorham (Global Crossing, 2001)
- Frontier Communications of Sylvan Lake (Global Crossing, 2001)
- Frontier Telephone of Rochester (Global Crossing, 2001)
- Ogden Telephone (acquired in 1997)

=== North Carolina ===
- Frontier Communications of the Carolinas (Verizon, 2010)

=== Ohio ===
- Frontier North (Verizon, 2010)

=== Pennsylvania ===
- Commonwealth Telephone (acquired in 2005)
- Frontier Communications of Breezewood (Global Crossing, 2001)
- Frontier Communications of Canton (Global Crossing, 2001)
- Frontier Communications of Lakewood (Global Crossing, 2001)
- Frontier Communications of Oswayo River (Global Crossing, 2001)
- Frontier Communications of Pennsylvania (Global Crossing, 2001)

=== South Carolina ===
- Frontier Communications of the Carolinas (Verizon, 2010)

=== Tennessee ===
- Citizens Telecommunications Company of Tennessee (GTE)
- Citizens Telecommunications Company of the Volunteer State (ALLTEL)

=== Utah ===
- Citizens Telecommunications Company of Utah (GTE)

=== Virginia ===
- Frontier Communications of Virginia (Verizon, 2010)

=== West Virginia ===
- Citizens Telecommunications Company of West Virginia (ALLTEL, 1995, includes GTE lines from 1993)
- Frontier West Virginia (Verizon, 2010)

=== Wisconsin ===
- Frontier Communications - St. Croix (Global Crossing, 2001)
- Frontier Communications of Mondovi (Global Crossing, 2001)
- Frontier Communications of Viroqua (Global Crossing, 2001)
- Frontier Communications of Wisconsin (Global Crossing, 2001)
- Frontier North (Verizon, 2010)
- Rhinelander Telephone (acquired in 1999)
