= Frontier Communications ILEC Holdings =

Frontier Communications ILEC Holdings, Inc.
- Type: Subsidiary
- Industry: Telecommunications
- Predecessor: Verizon
- Founded: 2009; 17 years ago
- Parent: Verizon (2009–2010,2026-Present); Frontier (2010–2026)
- Website: www.frontier.com

Frontier Communications ILEC Holdings, Inc. is a holding company subsidiary owned by Frontier Communications. It serves as a holding company for former Bell System, Contel, and GTE incumbent local exchange carrier (ILEC) telephone operating companies that were owned by Verizon prior to July 1, 2010.

== History ==
The company was formed by Verizon in 2009 to facilitate the planned sale of some local subsidiaries to Frontier, which was completed on July 1, 2010. The company was set up to allow for a Reverse Morris Trust merger, allowing Verizon to spin off the company to Frontier tax-free. Its primary purpose was to transfer Frontier ILEC Holdings as well as Verizon debt that Frontier was to assume.

== Subsidiary companies ==
The company was founded as New Communications ILEC Holdings, Inc. to own the following companies transferred from Verizon and GTE:

- Contel of the South
- New Communications of the Carolinas (split from Verizon South)
- New Communications of the Southwest (split from Verizon California)
- Verizon North
- Verizon Northwest
- Verizon West Coast
- Verizon West Virginia (originally part of the Bell System)

Once the purchase was completed, the relevant subsidiary company names were changed to reflect Frontier ownership.
