= Citizens Telecommunications Company of Nebraska =

- Type: Subsidiary of Frontier
- Industry: Telecommunications
- Predecessor: GTE Midwest
- Founded: 1999
- Headquarters: Kearney, Nebraska
- Products: Local Telephone Service
- Parent: Citizens/Frontier (1999-2026); Verizon (2026-present)
- Website: www.frontier.com

Citizens Telecommunications Company of Nebraska provides local telephone service in Nebraska and some rural communities in northern Kansas.

== History ==
Citizens Telecommunications Company of Nebraska was founded in 1999. It was created to assume control of former GTE Midwest operations that GTE sold off as part of a divestment plan to sell telephone lines nationwide before its acquisition by Bell Atlantic

Citizens Utilities, upon acquiring assets of the former Frontier Corporation, began doing business as Frontier Communications. The company adopted the Frontier name for all of its local telephone operations, at which point Citizens in Nebraska began doing business as Frontier Communications of Nebraska.

Frontier provides telephone service to central Nebraska communities such as Kearney through Citizens of Nebraska.

On September 5, 2024, Verizon announced that it will acquire Frontier Communications for $20 billion. This acquisition was completed on January 20, 2026. As a result, Verizon took control of Frontier's operations, including regaining the former GTE Midwest operations sold to Citizens.

== See also ==
- GTE Midwest
- Frontier Communications
- List of Frontier Communications operating companies
