= Emergency telephone number =

Number for local emergency services

Implementation of the two ITU approved emergency telephone numbers in the world: 112 911 112 and 911 Other number, no redirection or redirection for mobile phones only

An emergency telephone number is a number that allows a caller to contact local emergency services for assistance. The emergency number differs from country to country; it is typically a three-digit number so that it can be easily remembered and dialed quickly. Some countries have a different emergency number for each of the different emergency services; these often differ only by the last digit.

First introduced in the London area on 30 June 1937, the UK's 999 number is the world's oldest emergency call telephone service.

In many countries, dialing either 112 (used in Europe and parts of Asia, Africa and South America) or 911 (used mostly in the Americas) will connect callers to emergency services. For individual countries, see the list of emergency telephone numbers.

== Configuration and operation ==
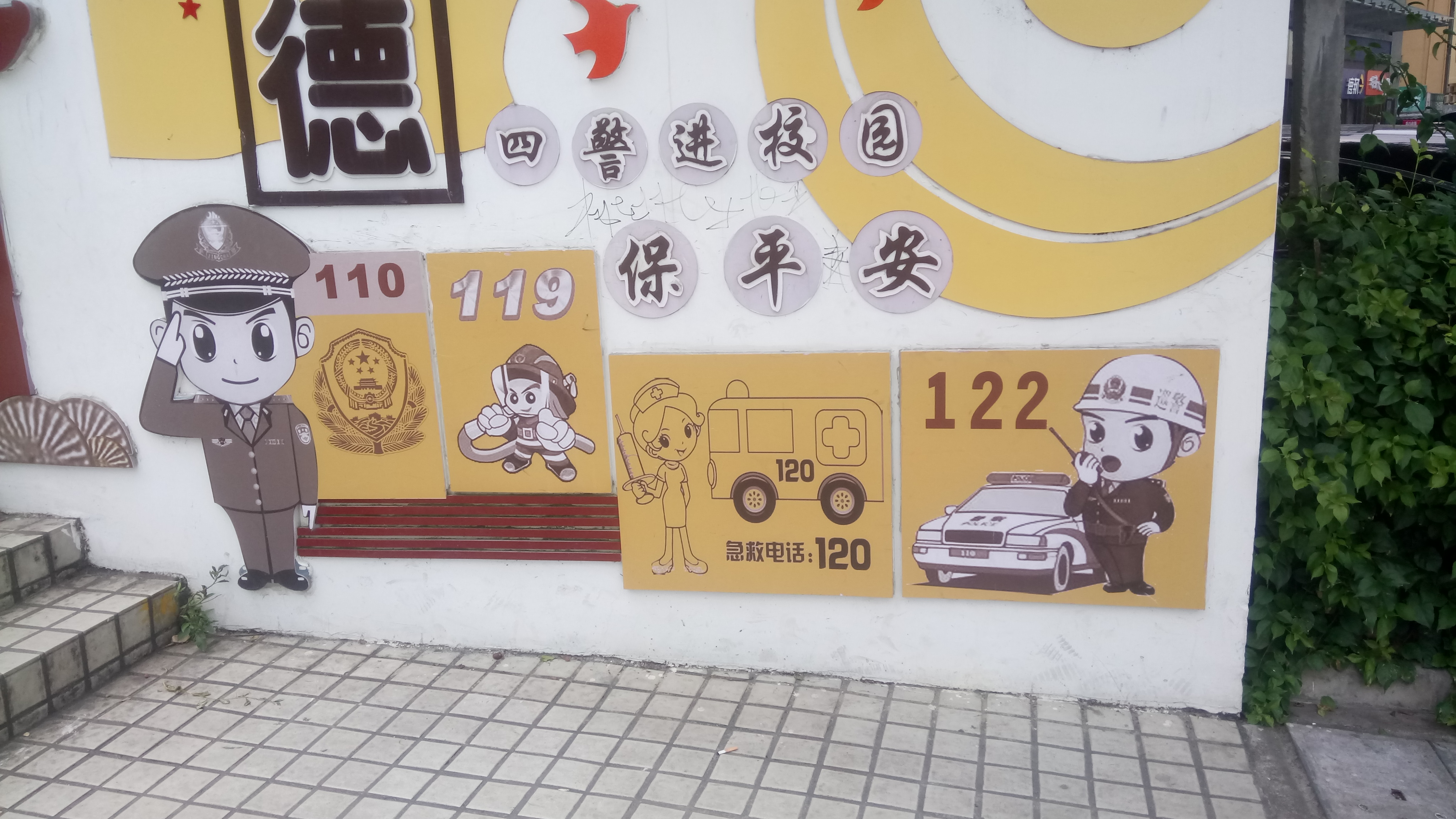
A mural at a Shenzhen elementary school showing emergency numbers used in Mainland China

The emergency telephone number is a special case in the country's telephone number plan. In the past, calls to the emergency telephone number were often routed over special dedicated circuits. Though with the advent of electronic exchanges these calls are now often mixed with ordinary telephone traffic, they still may be able to access circuits that other traffic cannot. Often the system is set up so that once a call is made to an emergency telephone number, it must be answered. Should the caller abandon the call, the line may still be held until the emergency service answers and releases the call.

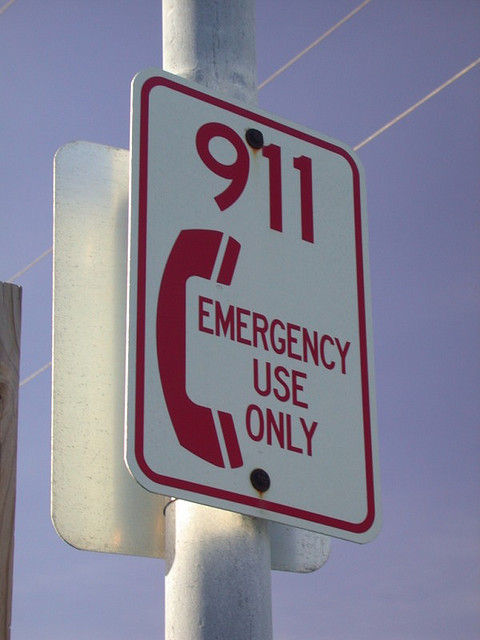
911 is the emergency number used in many countries in the Americas.

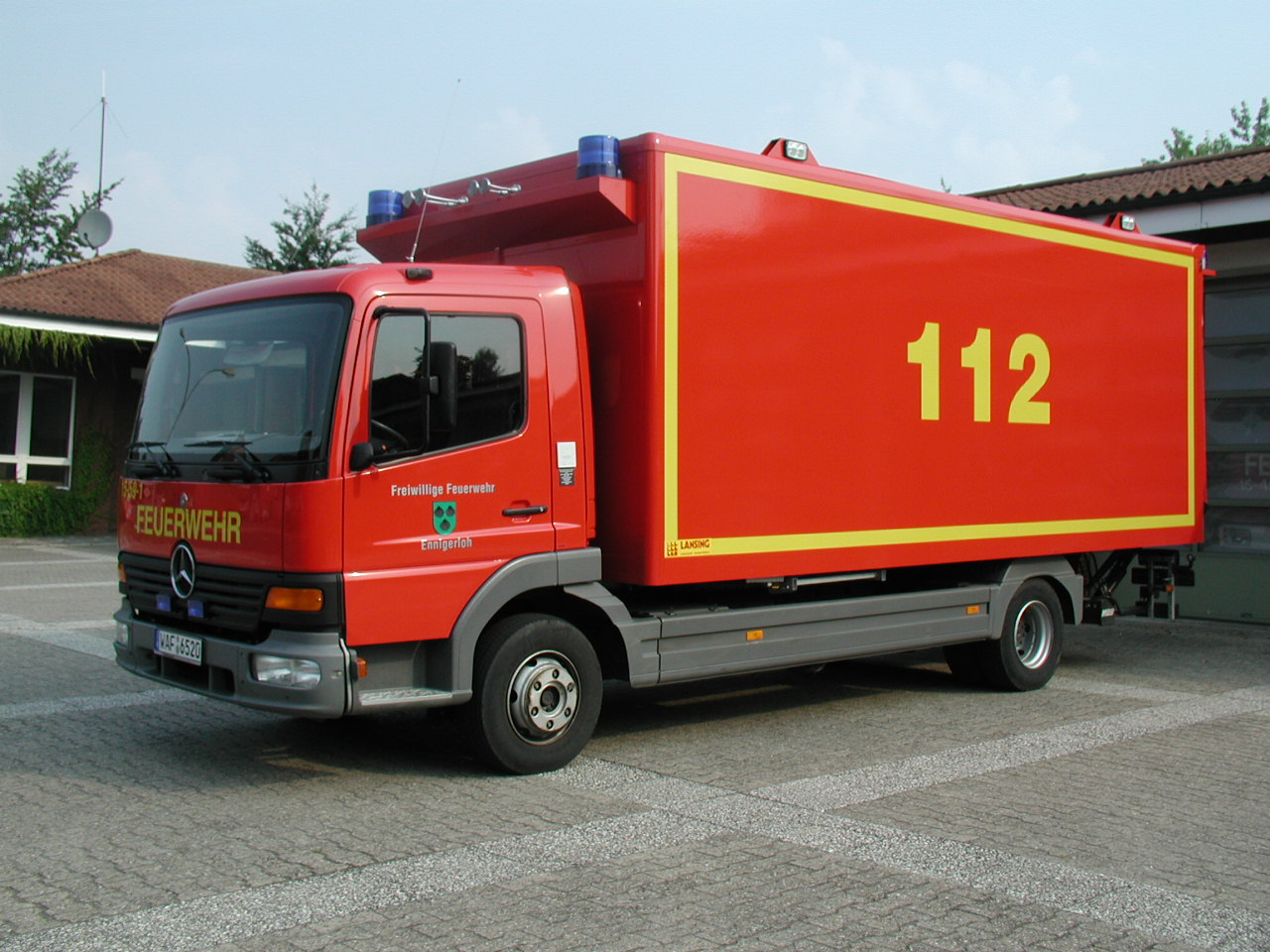
A fire truck in Ennigerloh, Germany, with the European emergency number 112 painted on its side

An emergency telephone number call may be answered by either a telephone operator or an emergency service dispatcher. The nature of the emergency (police, fire, medical, coast guard) is then determined. If the call has been answered by a telephone operator, they then connect the call to the appropriate emergency service, which then dispatches the appropriate help. In the case of multiple services being needed on a call, the most urgent need must be determined, with other services being called in as needed.

Emergency dispatchers are trained to control the call in order to provide help in an appropriate manner; they can be assisted by computer aided call handling systems (CACH). The emergency dispatcher may find it necessary to give urgent advice in life-threatening situations. Some dispatchers have special training in telling people how to perform first aid or CPR.

In many parts of the world, an emergency service can identify the telephone number that a call has been placed from. This is normally done using the system that the telephone company uses to bill calls, making the number visible even for users who have unlisted numbers or who block caller ID. Enhanced 911 and similar systems like E112 can provide the location of landline callers by looking up the physical address in a database, and mobile callers through triangulation from towers or GPS on the device. This is often specifically mandated in a country's telecommunication law.

== Operator-assisted dialing ==
When an emergency happened in the pre-dial (or "manual") telephone era, the user simply picked up the telephone receiver and waited for the operator to answer "number, please?". The user then responded with "get me the police", "I'm calling to report a fire", or "I need an ambulance/doctor". Even in large cities, it was seldom necessary to ask for these services by number.

In small towns, operators frequently provided additional services, knowing where to reach doctors, veterinarians, law enforcement personnel and firefighters at all times. Frequently, the operator was also responsible for activating the town's fire alarm.

When manual switching systems began to be replaced by automatic, or "dial", systems, there was frequently concern among users that the very personalized emergency service provided by manual operators would be lost.

Because numbers were different for every exchange, callers either had to dial the operator or look up the telephone number. This problem was at least partially solved in Canada, the UK, and the US by dialing "0" for the local assistance operator in case of emergency, although faster service could be obtained if the user dialed the full number for the Police or Fire Department. This system remained essentially unchanged throughout most of North America until the 1970s.

== Direct-dial numbers ==
=== 999 ===
The first emergency number system to be deployed anywhere in the world was in London on June 30, 1937 using the number 999, and this was later extended to cover the entire country. When 999 was dialed, a buzzer sounded and a red light flashed in the exchange to attract an operator's attention.

The emergency number 999 was adopted in Winnipeg, Manitoba, Canada, in 1959 at the urging of Stephen Juba, mayor of Winnipeg at the time. The city changed the number to 911 in 1972, in order to be consistent with the newly adopted US emergency number.

Others have adopted 999 as their official emergency number, including Bahrain, Bangladesh, Botswana, the Cook Islands, Eswatini, Ghana, Guernsey, Hong Kong, the Republic of Ireland, the Isle of Man, Jersey, Kenya, Macau, Malaysia, Mauritius, Niue, Poland, Qatar, Sudan, Saudi Arabia, Singapore, Trinidad and Tobago, Seychelles, Uganda, the United Arab Emirates, the United Kingdom, and Zimbabwe. Other countries also use it as an alternative, and many GSM handsets will connect 999 to the emergency services regardless of location.

=== 9999 ===
The number 9999 is used in the Sultanate of Oman for police and emergency services. 112 is used as an international number in the case of low network coverage.

=== 911 ===
Because of the design of US central office (phone) switches, it was not practical to use the British emergency number 999 (as was briefly considered). What was up to that time unassigned area code 911 was chosen instead. The "1" as the second digit was key; it told the switching equipment that this was not a routine call. (At the time, when the second digit was "1" or "0" the equipment handled the call as a long-distance or special-number call.) The first 911 emergency phone system went into use by the Alabama Telephone Company in Haleyville, Alabama in 1968. On February 16, 1968, the first-ever 9-1-1 call was placed by Alabama Speaker of the House Rankin Fite, from Haleyville City Hall, to U.S. Rep. Tom Bevill, at the city's police station. However, 911 systems were not in widespread use until the 1980s, when 911 was adopted as the standard number across most of the country (which is within the North American Numbering Plan).

The implementation of 911 service in the US was a gradual and haphazard process. Because telephone service boundaries did not always exactly match governmental and other jurisdictional boundaries, a user might dial 911, only to discover that they had been connected to the wrong dispatch center because they had telephone service from one location but lived within the boundaries of another jurisdiction.

Electromechanical switching equipment still in use made it difficult to adapt to recognize 911, especially in small towns and rural areas where the call might have to be switched over a considerable distance. For this reason, there are still county sheriff departments that have toll-free "800" area code numbers.

The rapid replacement of electromechanical switching systems in the 1980s with electronic, or digital, systems eliminated the problem of older switches that would not recognize 911. At this point, 911 service is available in most of North America, but there are still some remote, sparsely populated areas (such as Nunavut and the Northwest Territories in Canada's Arctic) that do not have it.

==== Enhanced 911 ====
Gradually, various problems were overcome; "smart", or "enhanced", 911 systems were developed that not only would display the caller's number and address at the dispatch center but also could be configured so that 911 calls were automatically routed to the correct dispatch center, regardless of what central office the caller was served from. In the United States, most cities have E911 systems either in use or in their emergency systems design plans.

=== 988 ===
In the United States and Canada, 988 is the national dedicated number for the Suicide & Crisis Lifeline. Dialing, texting, or chatting "988" offers free, confidential support for a victim—connecting them to a trained crisis counselor who can help with emotional distress, mental health struggles, substance use concerns, or thoughts of suicide.

=== 17, 18 ===
In France, many telephone exchanges were closed at night but it was still possible to make emergency calls. An operator had to connect the emergency calls only. In 1913, an automatic system was set up. It made provision for calling the police by dialing 17 and the fire brigade by dialing 18. As more manual telephone exchanges were converted to dial operation, more and more subscribers had access to these special numbers. The service was not widespread until the 1970s.

France now uses 112, the European emergency number, as well as 17 and 18 for police and fire brigade, specific to France.

=== 100, 101, 102 ===
100, 101, and 102 are the emergency telephone numbers in India (serving the police, medical and fire department respectively) and Israel (serving the police, Magen David Adom and the fire department accordingly).

India now accommodates both 112 and (100,101,102).

=== 01, 02, 03, 04 ===
01, 02, 03 and 04 were the universal emergency telephone numbers across the Soviet Union until 1992, with 01 being for fire, 02 for police, 03 for ambulances, and 04 for gas accidents. Today, 101, 102, 103 and 104 have currently remained as the emergency telephone numbers across Russia, Armenia, Belarus, Tajikistan, Turkmenistan, Azerbaijan, Kyrgyzstan, Kazakhstan and Uzbekistan.

=== 110 ===
110 is the emergency telephone number for the police in Iran, mainland China, Germany, Guatemala, Indonesia, Japan and Taiwan.

==== 95110 ====
The emergency number for the China Coast Guard is 95110, a variant of 110.

=== 111 ===
The emergency number 111 was adopted in New Zealand in 1955 and was first implemented in Masterton and Carterton in September 1958. New Zealand telephones had their rotary dials numbered in reverse to the UK and most of the world, with the number 1 on New Zealand rotary phones in the same position as the number 9 on British rotary phones. Dialling 111 would be recognised by the British-built step-by-step exchanges then used as a 999 emergency call, which would route the call accordingly.

=== 112 ===
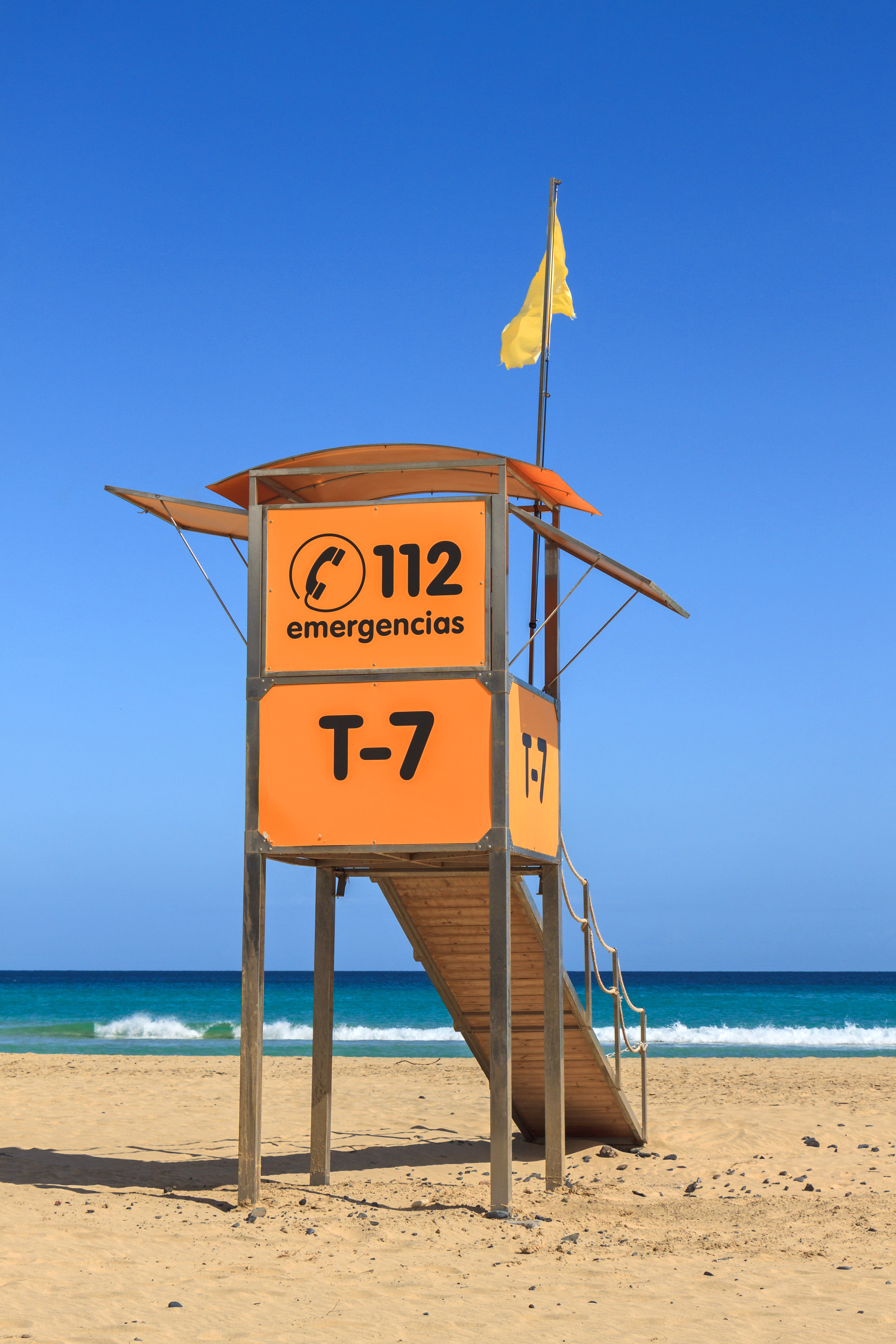
112 on a lifeguard tower in Pájara, Spain

The CEPT recommended the use of 112 in 1972. The European Union subsequently adopted the 112 number as a standard on 29 July 1991. It is now a valid emergency number throughout EU countries and in many other CEPT countries. It works in parallel with other local emergency numbers in about two out of three EU states.

=== 116 ===
Southern California Telephone Co. began using 116 as an emergency line for Los Angeles, California in 1946.

=== 119 ===
119 is an emergency telephone number in countries including China, Japan, South Korea, Taiwan and Sri Lanka.

=== 120 ===
120 is the emergency telephone number for ambulance service in China. It was the Police number in Guatemala, now replaced by the 110 number.

=== 122 ===
122 is an emergency telephone number in several countries. For example, it is used for fire emergencies in Austria, for traffic emergencies in China, and for police emergencies in Egypt. It is the Voluntary Fire Corps, also for medical and accident emergencies, in Guatemala.

=== 123 ===
It is the number for the Municipal Fire Corps, also medical and accident emergencies, in Guatemala. Not all municipalities have their own Fire departments.

=== 000 ===
Before 1969, Australia lacked a national number for emergency services; the police, fire and ambulance services possessed many phone numbers, one for each local unit. In 1961, the office of the Postmaster General (PMG) introduced the Triple Zero (000) number in major population centres and near the end of the 1980s extended its coverage nationwide. The number Triple Zero (000) was chosen for several reasons: technically, it suited the dialing system for the most remote automatic exchanges, particularly outback Queensland. These communities used the digit 0 to select an automatic trunk line to a centre. In the most remote communities, two 0s had to be used to reach a main centre; thus dialing 0+0, plus another 0 would call (at least) an operator. Zero is closest to the finger stall on Australian rotary dial phones, so it was easy to dial in darkness. The Telecommunications Numbering Plan 1997, also administered by ACMA, specifies that:

- the primary emergency service number is "000" and
- the secondary emergency service numbers are "106" and "112".

=== 1122 ===
1122 is an emergency telephone number in Pakistan. It can be used to call for fire and medical emergencies.

=== 1554 ===
It is used by the Association of Municipal Fire and Emergency Corps (ASOBOMBD) in Guatemala.

== Standardisation ==
=== ITU standard: 112 or 911 ===
The International Telecommunication Union has officially set two standard emergency phone numbers for countries to use in the future. AP reports that member states have agreed that either 911 or 112 should be designated as emergency phone numbers – 911 is more commonly used in the Americas, while 112 is standard across the EU and in many other countries worldwide.

=== IP telephony ===
In January 2008, the Internet Engineering Task Force released a set of RFC documents pertaining to emergency calls in IP networks.

== Mobile telephony ==
Mobile phones can be used in countries with different emergency numbers. This means that a traveller visiting a foreign country does not have to know the local emergency numbers. The mobile phone and the SIM card have a preprogrammed list of emergency numbers. When the user tries to set up a call using an emergency number known by a GSM or 3G phone, the special emergency call setup takes place. The actual number is not even transmitted into the network, but the network redirects the emergency call to the local emergency desk. Most GSM mobile phones can dial emergency numbers even when the phone keyboard is locked, the phone is without a SIM card, the emergency number is entered instead of the PIN or there is no network signal (busy network).

Most GSM mobile phones have 112, and 911 as pre-programmed emergency numbers that are always available. The SIM card issued by the operator can contain additional country-specific emergency numbers that can be used even when roaming abroad. The GSM network can also update the list of well-known emergency numbers when the phone registers to it.

Using an emergency number recognized by a GSM phone like 112 instead of another emergency number may be advantageous, since GSM phones and networks give special priority to emergency calls. A phone dialing an emergency service number not recognized by it may refuse to roam onto another network, leading to trouble if there is no access to the home network. Dialing a known emergency number like 112 forces the phone to try the call with any available network.

On some networks, a GSM phone without a SIM card may be used to make emergency calls, and most GSM phones accept a larger list of emergency numbers without SIM card, such as 112, 911, 118, 119, 000, 110, 08, and 999.

However, some GSM networks will not accept emergency calls from phones without a SIM card. For example, to decrease the risk of nuisance calls, French and British networks typically did not allow emergency calls without a SIM card. For France case, it was decided by law in 2004, reducing of 40% the number of "wasted incoming calls" that has been avoided.

The GSM phones may regard some phone numbers with one or two digits as special service codes. It might be impossible to make an emergency call to numbers like 03 or 92 with a mobile phone. In those cases the emergency number has to be called by using a landline telephone or with an additional first/last digit (for example 922 or 992 instead of 92 and 003 or 033 instead of 03).

In the United States, the FCC requires networks to route every mobile-phone and payphone 911 call to an emergency service call center, including phones that have never had service, or whose service has lapsed. As a result, there are programs that provide donated used mobile phones to victims of domestic violence and others especially likely to need emergency services. Since 2020, emergency responders have been able to better locate callers who dial 911 on their cellphones from indoors as the U.S. wireless industry improved caller-location for the majority of such calls. The "heightened location accuracy", available to supporting networks and handsets, can find callers through nearby devices connected to Wi-Fi or Bluetooth that are logged with a specific location in a special emergency-services database.

Mobile phones generate additional problems for emergency operators, as many phones will allow emergency numbers to be dialed even while the keypad is locked. Since mobile phones are typically carried in pockets and small bags, the keys can easily be depressed accidentally, leading to unintended calls. A system has been developed in the UK to connect calls where the caller is sent to an automated system, leaving more operators free to handle genuine emergency calls.

== Electro-mechanical issues ==
As earlier telephone systems used loop disconnect dialing, attention was devoted to avoiding the number being dialed accidentally by errant interruptions of the circuits by making them involve long sequences of pulses, such as with the UK 999 emergency number. This meant that "111" could not be used: "111" dialing could accidentally take place when phone lines were in too close proximity to each other. Subscribers, as they were called then, were even given instructions on how to find the number "9" on the dial in darkened, or smoke-filled, rooms, by locating and placing the first finger in the "0" and the second in the "9", then removing the first when actually dialling. Some people have reported accidentally dialing 112 by loop-disconnect for various technical reasons, including while working on extension telephone wiring, and point to this as a disadvantage of the 112 emergency number, which takes only four loop-disconnects to activate.

== See also ==
- 999 (emergency telephone number)
- Advanced Mobile Location (or "Emergency Location Service")
- Amateur radio emergency communications
- Distress signal
- E112
- eCall
- Emergency telephone
- Helpline
- In case of emergency (ICE) entry in the mobile phone book
- List of emergency telephone numbers
- National Emergency Number Association (NENA)
- Phone fraud
- Single Non-Emergency Number
