= Frontier Communications of Breezewood =

Frontier Communications of Breezewood, LLC
- Company type: Private (Subsidiary of Frontier)
- Industry: Telecommunications
- Founded: 1974
- Headquarters: United States
- Products: Local Telephone Service
- Parent: Rochester Telephone/Frontier (until 1999); Global Crossing (1999-2001); Frontier Communications (2001-2026); Verizon (2026-present)
- Website: www.frontier.com

Frontier Communications of Breezewood, LLC is a Frontier Communications operating company providing local telephone services to Breezewood, Pennsylvania. It also provides telephone service to Needmore, New Grenada, and Warfordsburg.

The company was founded in 1974. It was acquired by Rochester Telephone as it began to expand nationally. In 1994, Rochester Telephone changed its name to Frontier Corporation, and the local operating company became known as Frontier Communications of Breezewood, Inc. Global Crossing acquired Frontier in 1999, and Citizens Communications acquired Global Crossing's Frontier assets in 2001, and has owned it since.

The company was converted into an LLC in 2003.

On September 5, 2024 Verizon announced that it will acquire Frontier Communications for $20 billion. This acquisition was completed on January 20, 2026. As a result, Verizon took control of Frontier's operations, including Frontier Communications of Breezewood.

== See also ==
- Global Crossing North America
- List of Frontier Communications operating companies
- Frontier Communications
