= Ogden Telephone =

Ogden Telephone most commonly refers to:

- Ogden Telephone (Iowa company), a telecommunications provider in Boone County, Iowa
- Ogden Telephone (New York company), a defunct telephone operator absorbed into Frontier Communications
