= Citizens Utilities Rural =

Subsidy of Frontier Communications

- Industry: Telecommunications
- Founded: 1962; 64 years ago
- Headquarters: Kingman, Arizona, United States
- Products: Wired telecommunications
- Owner: Verizon
- Parent: Verizon Communications
- Subsidiaries: Frontier Communications
- Website: frontier.com

Citizens Utilities Rural Company, Inc. is a telephone operating company of Frontier Communications serving customers in Mohave County, Arizona. It was established in 1962. It is separate from Citizens Telecommunications Company of the White Mountains and the Navajo Communications Company. W. B. Foshay Company, a predecessor of Frontier, bought California & Nevada Telephone of Kingman in 1929.

On September 5, 2024 Verizon announced that it will acquire Frontier Communications for $20 billion. This acquisition was completed on January 20, 2026. As a result, Verizon took control of Frontier's operations, including Citizens Utilities Rural.
