= C&P Telephone =

Former Baby Bell telecom company

Verizon Maryland LLC Verizon Virginia LLC Verizon Washington, DC, Inc.
- Formerly: DC: The Chesapeake and Potomac Telephone Company; Bell Atlantic - Washington, D.C., Inc. MD: The Chesapeake and Potomac Telephone Company of Baltimore City; The Chesapeake and Potomac Telephone Company of Maryland; Bell Atlantic - Maryland, Inc. VA: The Chesapeake and Potomac Telephone Company of Virginia; Bell Atlantic - Virginia, Inc.
- Type: Subsidiaries
- Industry: Telecommunications
- Founded: 1883; 143 years ago (DC); 1884; 142 years ago (MD); 1903; 123 years ago (VA)
- Headquarters: Washington, DC (DC); Baltimore, MD (MD); Richmond, VA (VA) USA
- Products: Local Telephone Service
- Parent: American Bell (1883-1899); AT&T (1899–1983); Bell Atlantic/Verizon (1984–present)
- Website: Verizon Maryland; Verizon Virginia; Verizon Washington DC

The Chesapeake and Potomac Telephone Company, usually known as C&P Telephone, is a former d/b/a name for four Bell Operating Companies providing service to Washington, D.C., Maryland, West Virginia, and Virginia.

Today, three of the companies are owned by Verizon Communications: The Chesapeake and Potomac Telephone Company (DC), The Chesapeake and Potomac Telephone Company of Maryland, and The Chesapeake and Potomac Telephone Company of Virginia. The Chesapeake and Potomac Telephone Company of West Virginia is owned by Frontier Communications.

== History ==
=== The Chesapeake and Potomac Telephone Company (DC) ===
The Chesapeake and Potomac Telephone Company was founded in June 1883. C&P Telephone Co. provided telephone service to Washington, D.C.

In July 1969, President Richard Nixon's telephone call to Apollo 11 astronauts originated from C&P Telephone Co. equipment.

=== The Chesapeake and Potomac Telephone Company of Maryland ===
C&P Tel. Co. of Maryland logo, 1964-1969

The C&P Telephone Company of Maryland was founded in 1884 as The Chesapeake and Potomac Telephone Company of Baltimore City. It changed its name to The Chesapeake and Potomac Telephone Company of Maryland on January 3, 1956, and the corporate name at this point changed to C&P Telephone of Maryland.

C&P relaxed its rule against the hiring of African-Americans for white collar jobs in January 1943 due to labor shortages during World War II, but telephone operator positions remained racially segregated until the hiring of Hermie Graham for a position at a C&P office in Govans in 1974.

=== The Chesapeake and Potomac Telephone Company of Virginia ===
C&P Tel. Co. of Virginia logo, 1964-1969

The Chesapeake and Potomac Telephone Company of Virginia was founded in 1903.

In 2010, operations in Alleghany County that served customers in Crows and Hematite were split from Verizon Virginia and transferred to Frontier Communications of Virginia, a subsidiary of Frontier Communications. This was because the central office serving those exchanges was located in West Virginia and was included in the sale of assets to Frontier Communications.

== Changes ==
After AT&T's 1969 corporate identity overhaul, which included the famous Saul Bass Bell logo, all four companies' names were shortened to C&P Telephone on marketing materials, bills, vehicles, etc.

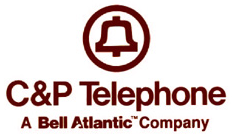
C&P Telephone logo, 1984-1994

In 1984, when the Bell System was divided into the Regional Bell Operating Companies, or "Baby Bells", the C&P Telephone companies became part of Bell Atlantic.

In 1994, Bell Atlantic renamed all of its operating companies. C&P Telephone was renamed:

- Bell Atlantic – Maryland, Inc.
- Bell Atlantic – Virginia, Inc.
- Bell Atlantic – Washington, D.C., Inc.
- Bell Atlantic – West Virginia, Inc.

After Bell Atlantic's merger with GTE in 2000, the system was renamed Verizon, and so were its Bell Operating Companies. The C&P companies were renamed:

- Verizon Maryland, Inc.
- Verizon Virginia, Inc.
- Verizon Washington, DC, Inc.
- Verizon West Virginia, Inc.

In 2010, Verizon left the West Virginia wireline market entirely, selling Verizon West Virginia to Frontier Communications as part of a major sale of assets. The company was renamed Frontier West Virginia, Inc.

In 2011, Verizon Virginia became a limited liability company, changing its name to Verizon Virginia LLC. In December 2012, Verizon Maryland, Inc., incorporated in Maryland, was merged into Verizon Maryland Merge Co., a Delaware corporation; the name of the Delaware-based company was then changed to Verizon Maryland LLC

== See also ==
- Bell System
- Frontier West Virginia
- Chesapeake and Potomac Telephone Company Warehouse and Repair Facility
