= Frontier Communications of Mondovi =

Frontier Communications of Mondovi LLC
- Company type: Private (Subsidiary of Frontier)
- Industry: Telecommunications
- Founded: 1904
- Headquarters: Mondovi, Wisconsin, United States
- Products: Local Telephone Service
- Parent: Rochester Telephone/Frontier (until 1999); Global Crossing (1999-2001); Citizens/Frontier (2001-2026); Verizon (2026-present)
- Website: http://www.frontier.com/

Frontier Communications of Mondovi LLC is a telephone operating of Frontier Communications providing local telephone services to Mondovi, Wisconsin. The company was founded in 1904, as the Mondovi Telephone Company. It was later acquired by Rochester Telephone.

In 1994, Rochester Tel changed its name to Frontier Corporation, resulting in Mondovi Telephone becoming Frontier Communications of Mondovi, Inc. The company later became an LLC. Many people regard Frontier Communications as the worst in the industry, offering a 3 Mbps connection in rural Mondovi. Users rarely receive said speeds.

There was an outage on April 25, 2017 that lasted from approximately 10:30AM to 4:17PM.

On September 5, 2024 Verizon announced that it will acquire Frontier Communications for $20 billion. This acquisition was completed on January 20, 2026. As a result, Verizon took control of Frontier's operations, including Frontier Communications of Mondovi.
