= Citizens Telecommunications Company of the White Mountains =

Frontier operating company in Arizona

- Type: Subsidiary
- Industry: Telecommunications
- Predecessor: Contel of the West
- Founded: 1999; 27 years ago
- Headquarters: Show Low, Arizona, US
- Products: Local telephone service
- Parent: Frontier (1999-2026); Verizon (2026-present)
- Website: frontierwhitemountains.com

Citizens Telecommunications Company of the White Mountains is a Frontier operating company providing local telephone services to portions of Arizona.

The company was formed by Citizens Communications following the acquisition of former Contel/GTE lines in Arizona in 1999. It is separate from Navajo Communications Company, which provides telephone service to customers formerly serviced by Alltel, and Frontier Communications of the Southwest, which provides telephone service to former Verizon California customers.

On September 5, 2024 Verizon announced that it will acquire Frontier Communications for $20 billion. This acquisition was completed on January 20, 2026. As a result, Verizon took control of Frontier's operations, including regaining the former Contel/GTE lines in Arizona sold to Citizens.
