= Foshay =

Foshay is a surname. Notable people with the surname include:

- Arthur W. Foshay (1918–1998), American school principal and consultant
- Wilbur B. Foshay (1881–1957), American businessman
