= Frontier Communications of Virginia =

Frontier Communications of Virginia, Inc.
- Company type: Private (Subsidiary of Frontier)
- Industry: Telecommunications
- Predecessor: Verizon Virginia
- Founded: 2009
- Headquarters: United States
- Products: Local Telephone Service
- Parent: Frontier (2009-2026); Verizon (2026-Present)
- Website: www.frontier.com

Frontier Communications of Virginia, Inc. is an operating company created in 2009 to take over operations in Crows, Virginia and Hematite, Virginia (located in Alleghany County that had been served by Verizon Virginia (formerly The Chesapeake and Potomac Telephone Company of Virginia).

Frontier Communications purchased Verizon West Virginia from Verizon Communications effective July 1, 2010. Because the Crows-Hematite central office, located on the state line of Virginia and West Virginia, received its dial tone from a central office in West Virginia, operations in Alleghany County were split from the former C&P Telephone Company of Virginia and transferred to Frontier.

On September 5, 2024 Verizon announced that it will acquire Frontier Communications for $20 billion. This acquisition was completed on January 20, 2026. As a result, Verizon took control of Frontier's operations, including regaining the former assets of Verizon Virginia sold to Frontier.
