= Windstream Kentucky East =

Windstream operating company in Kentucky

Windstream Kentucky East LLC
- Company type: Private company (Subsidiary of Windstream)
- Industry: Telecommunications
- Predecessor: Verizon South
- Founded: 2001
- Headquarters: Lexington, KY, USA
- Key people: Brian Harman, President
- Products: Local Telephone Service
- Number of employees: 676
- Parent: Alltel (2001–2006); Windstream (2006–present)
- Website: windstream.com

Windstream Kentucky East LLC is a Windstream operating company providing local telephone services to portions of Kentucky.

== History ==
Windstream Kentucky East was established in 2001 as Kentucky ALLTEL, Inc. (as opposed to ALLTEL Kentucky, Inc., an existing company Alltel owned). The company was founded to take over Verizon South operations that were formerly operated by GTE and included were those originally operated by Contel. In 2002, the sale of Verizon's assets in Kentucky took place, with Alltel becoming owner.

In 2006, the company was renamed Windstream Kentucky East, Inc., following the sale of Alltel's wireline assets to Valor Telecom. Valor renamed itself Windstream.

In 2007, the company became a limited liability company.

As of 2012, the company has 676 employees and operates 508,000 lines in 94 exchanges.
