= GTE (disambiguation) =

GTE may refer to:

- GTE, a defunct American telephone company
- Global Telecoms Exploitation, a British surveillance programme
- Gran Tierra Energy, a Canadian energy company
- Groote Eylandt Airport, in Northern Territory, Australia
- GTE Financial, an American credit union
- LM GTE, a racing car class
- Gone To Earth, the original name of rock band BulletProof Messenger
- Greatest Talent Ever in Indian Idol 12
- Volkswagen Golf GTE and Passat GTE, two plug-in hybrid cars
