= Windstream Kentucky West =

Windstream Kentucky West LLC
- Company type: Private company (Subsidiary of Windstream)
- Industry: Telecommunications
- Founded: 1954
- Headquarters: Shepherdsville, KY, USA
- Key people: Brian Harman, President
- Products: Local Telephone Service
- Parent: Alltel (until 2006); Windstream (2006–present)
- Website: windstream.com

Windstream Kentucky West LLC is a Windstream operating company providing local telephone services to small portions of Kentucky.

== History ==
Windstream Kentucky West was established in 1954. It was acquired by Alltel and changed its name to ALLTEL Kentucky, Inc..

In 2002, Alltel acquired Verizon's operations in Kentucky formerly part of Verizon South and founded Kentucky ALLTEL for assets originally owned by GTE.

In 2006, the company was renamed Windstream Kentucky West, Inc., following the sale of Alltel's wireline assets to Valor Telecom. Valor renamed itself Windstream.

In 2007, the company became a limited liability company.

As of 2012, the company has 23 employees and operates 27,000 lines in 5 exchanges.
