= Frontier Midstates =

Frontier Midstates, Inc.
- Formerly: Continental Telephone Company of the South; Contel of the South, Inc.
- Company type: Subsidiary
- Industry: Telecommunications
- Founded: 1956; 70 years ago
- Area served: Indiana, Michigan
- Key people: Don Banowetz (president)
- Products: Local Telephone Service
- Parent: Contel (until 1993); GTE (1993-2000); Verizon (2000-2010, 2026–present); Frontier (2010–2026)

Frontier Midstates, Inc. is a telephone operating company of Frontier Communications serving Indiana and Michigan. It was originally owned by Contel, and later purchased by GTE, Verizon, Frontier, and reacquired by Verizon in 2026.

== History ==
The company was established in 1956 to provide telephone service in Georgia. As a subsidiary of Contel, it adopted the name Continental Telephone Company of the South. It expanded as it absorbed the operations various companies in Alabama and Georgia, including Alabama Telephone Company in 1975, Coosa Valley Telephone Company, and Tri-County Telephone Company, Incorporated in 1978. The company adopted its abbreviated name, Contel of the South, Inc., in 1988.

=== Acquisition by GTE ===
Contel was acquired by GTE in 1991 and the operating company began doing business as GTE Systems of the South. It was not associated with GTE South, a separate operating company.

On October 31, 1993, Contel of the South and Alltel traded service regions. Contel of the South regions in Georgia area were traded for Alltel's Indiana and Michigan service regions.

=== Acquisition by Verizon ===
In 2000, GTE was purchased by Bell Atlantic, becoming Verizon. Contel of the South began doing business as Verizon Mid-States and Verizon North Systems.

In 2002, Verizon sold its operations in Alabama, including those from Contel of the South and GTE South to CenturyTel. Those operations became CenturyTel of Alabama. This left the company, incorporated in Georgia, with operations in Indiana and Michigan.

The company remained one of two former GTE operating companies to have retained its original name since acquisition by Verizon (the other is GTE Southwest); it also remained the only operating company using the Contel name.

=== Sale to Frontier ===
Contel of the South, along with several other Verizon wireline operating companies, were transferred to a new holding company New Communications ILEC Holdings, which was acquired by Frontier Communications on July 1, 2010. Contel of the South, Inc., at that point, became Frontier Midstates, Inc.

=== Sale back to Verizon ===
On September 5, 2024 Verizon announced that it will acquire Frontier Communications for $20 billion. This acquisition was completed on January 20, 2026. As a result, Verizon took control of Frontier's operations, including regaining Frontier Midstates.

== See also ==
- Frontier North

== Sources ==
- FCC History: Contel of the South, Inc. dba Verizon Mid-States
