= Alabama Telephone Company =

American independent telephone company

The Alabama Telephone Company was an American independent telephone company in Northwest Alabama, operating in the mid-20th century and serving Pickens County, Fayette County, and the Haleyville area. At its peak, it was the largest telephone company in Alabama outside of the Bell System. It is best known for being the first telephone company in North America to implement 9-1-1 service.

== History ==
The company was founded in 1938.

In 1954, employees organized under the Communications Workers of America and held a strike for over a year. In the tenth month of the strike, the company headquarters was dynamited, in connection with a series of dynamite and shotgun attacks surrounding communication workers strikes throughout the Southern United States. The strike ended in August 1955 when the National Labor Relations Board ruled that a new election of non-striking employees should redetermine whether the company should be unionized; the union won the vote. In October, following the end of the strike, the exchange in Hamilton, Alabama was reduced to rubble by a dynamite attack.

In 1966, it created a subdivision to sell cable television, which was contracted to Stromberg-Carlson.

In January 1968, after reading a national newspaper story about AT&T's intent to build a 9-1-1 system, company president Bob Gallagher determined to implement the system himself. On February 16, the first 9-1-1 call in North America was placed by Alabama Speaker of the House Rankin Fite, with the phone answered by Tom Bevill at the Haleyville, Alabama police station. Alabama Public Service Commission director Bull Connor witnessed the call being answered. According to Gallagher, the motivation to beat AT&T to implementing 9-1-1 came from his father, a fire chief in West Virginia. However, the logic of having two villains of the civil rights movement as the first 9-1-1 dispatchers has been questioned.

In 1975, it was purchased by Georgia State Telephone Company, which later became a subsidiary of Contel called "Contel of the South" and currently operates as Frontier Midstates. In 2002, the relevant Alabama service was resold to CenturyTel of Alabama. In 2022, it was again resold to Brightspeed.
