= GTE Financial =

American credit union

GTE Federal Credit Union d/b/a GTE Financial
- Company type: Credit union
- Industry: Financial services
- Founded: March 4, 1935
- Headquarters: Tampa, Florida, United States
- Area served: Tampa Bay area
- Products: Savings; checking; consumer loans; mortgages; credit cards
- Total assets: $2.08 billion
- Website: gtefinancial.org

GTE Federal Credit Union, doing business as GTE Financial, is an American credit union, headquartered in Tampa, Florida, and chartered and regulated under the authority of the National Credit Union Administration (NCUA). As of March 31, 2018, GTE had 262,538 members.

The organization was founded in 1935 as the Peninsular Telephone Employees Credit Union to serve the employees of Peninsular Telephone Company. After Peninsular became part of GTE (since merged with Verizon), the credit union was renamed GTE Federal Credit Union in 1958. Effective August 2012, the credit union rebranded itself as GTE Financial to reflect its status as a full-service financial institution.
