= Frontier Communications of the Carolinas =

Operating company (LLC)

Frontier Communications of the Carolinas LLC
- Company type: Private (Subsidiary of Frontier)
- Industry: Telecommunications
- Predecessor: Verizon South
- Founded: 2009
- Headquarters: United States
- Area served: Illinois, North Carolina, South Carolina, Wisconsin
- Products: Local Telephone Service
- Parent: Verizon (2009-2010, 2026-present); Frontier (2010-2026)
- Website: www.frontier.com

Frontier Communications of the Carolinas LLC is an operating company created in 2009 when some assets of Verizon South were split off and sold to Frontier Communications. The company provides local telephone service to former Verizon (formerly GTE and Contel) customers in portions of southern Wisconsin, Illinois, South Carolina, and North Carolina.

The company was established in 2009 as New Communications of the Carolinas, Inc. in preparation for the spin-off of Verizon South located outside of the state of Virginia and Knotts Island, North Carolina. When the company was acquired by Frontier, it became the operator of the former Verizon South lines and the name was changed to Frontier Communications of the Carolinas, Inc.

The company was converted to a limited liability company in 2013, becoming Frontier Communications of the Carolinas LLC.

On September 5, 2024 Verizon announced that it will acquire Frontier Communications for $20 billion. This acquisition was completed on January 20, 2026. As a result, Verizon took control of Frontier's operations, including regaining the former Verizon South assets sold to Frontier.
