= CenturyTel of Alabama =

CenturyTel of Alabama, LLC
- Company type: Subsidiary
- Industry: Telecommunications
- Predecessor: Contel of the South; Verizon South
- Founded: 2002; 24 years ago
- Headquarters: Pell City, Alabama, United States
- Products: Local Telephone Service
- Parent: Brightspeed
- Website: www.brightspeed.com

CenturyTel of Alabama, LLC is a telephone operating company owned by Brightspeed that provides local telephone service in Alabama.

The company was established in 2002 upon CenturyTel's purchase of lines from Verizon Communications. The lines in Alabama were split from Verizon South and Contel of the South, which were originally operating companies owned by GTE.

The company was among those sold in 2022 to form Brightspeed. The purchase closed on October 3, 2022.
