= GTNW =

GTNW may refer to:

- Global Thermo-Nuclear War, a video game mode in Call of Duty: Modern Warfare 2
- GTE Northwest, the former name of the company Frontier Communications Northwest
