= Jacks Valley =

Jacks Valley may refer to:

- Jacks Valley (United States Air Force Academy), a training complex on the grounds of the United States Air Force Academy in Colorado Springs, Colorado
- Jacks Valley (Nevada), a valley in Nevada
