= Navajo Communications =

Subsidy of Frontier Communications

Navajo Communications Company, Inc.
- Type: Subsidiary
- Industry: Telecommunications
- Founded: 1928; 98 years ago
- Headquarters: St. Michaels, Arizona, United States
- Products: Local Telephone Service
- Parent: Citizens/Frontier (until 2026) Verizon (2026-present)
- Website: www.frontier.com

Navajo Communications Company, Inc. is the operating company of Frontier Communications that provides telephone services in Arizona to the Navajo people.

Telephone service to the Navajo began in 1928 when the Bureau of Indian Affairs began building telephone lines to connect its facilities. In 1969, the BIA sold the system to Great Southwest Telephone Co. In 1981, Great Southwest Telephone was acquired by CP National. In 1988, CP National was acquired by Alltel. In 1994, Alltel sold off its operations for the Navajo to Citizens Communications. Citizens later changed its name to the current Frontier Communications.

The company is separate from Citizens Telecommunications Company of the White Mountains, which is a Frontier operating company formed in 1996 following the acquisition of former Contel/GTE service regions in Arizona.

On September 5, 2024 Verizon announced that it will acquire Frontier Communications for $20 billion. This acquisition was completed on January 20, 2026. As a result, Verizon took control of Frontier's operations, including Navajo Communications Company.
