= Verizon North =

Verizon North LLC
- Type: Subsidiary
- Industry: Telecommunications
- Predecessor: Verizon North Inc.
- Founded: 2010; 16 years ago
- Area served: Pennsylvania
- Products: Local Telephone Service, DSL, FTTH (FiOS)
- Parent: Verizon
- Website: verizon.com

Verizon North LLC is a Verizon operating company providing local telephone service to former GTE customers in Pennsylvania.

== History ==
In 2010, when the original Verizon North, whose service region included Pennsylvania, was sold to Frontier Communications, the original company became Frontier North, with the Pennsylvania operations split into a new company, Verizon North Retain Company.

The current company, Verizon North LLC, was created in December 2010 and absorbed the operations of Verizon North Retain Co.

It is separate from Verizon Pennsylvania which provides telephone service to former Bell System lines.
