= Frontier Communications of the Southwest =

Operating company

Frontier Communications of the Southwest Inc.
- Type: Subsidiary
- Industry: Telecommunications
- Predecessor: Verizon California
- Founded: 2009; 17 years ago
- Headquarters: Elk Grove, California, US
- Area served: Arizona, California, Nevada
- Products: Local Telephone Service
- Parent: Verizon
- Website: www.frontier.com

Frontier Communications of the Southwest Inc. is a Frontier Communications operating company providing local telephone services in former Verizon California territory in Arizona, California, and Nevada. The company was created as a subsidiary of New Communications ILEC Holdings by Verizon in 2009 and sold on July 1, 2010, to Frontier.

The predecessors of Frontier Communications of the Southwest were two rural telephone companies. One was Parker Valley Telephone of Parker, Arizona. Contel acquired Parker Valley Telephone in 1964.

Another predecessor was United Farmers Telephone of Gardnerville, Nevada. United Farmers Telephone merged with Interstate Telegraph in 1949. California Interstate Telephone acquired Interstate Telegraph in 1954. Contel acquired California Interstate Telephone in 1965.

Both Parker Valley Telephone and United Farmers Telephone became part of Contel of California. Contel of California was merged into GTE California (later Verizon California) in 1993.

The exchanges operated by Frontier Communications of the Southwest are:

- California: Alpine, Coleville, Earp/Big River, Havasu Landing, Parker Dam, Blythe, and Palo Verde
- Arizona: Cibola, Ehrenberg, Bouse, Parker, Parker Dam, and Poston.
- Nevada/California: Gardnerville, Gardnerville Ranchos, Glenbrook, Jacks Valley, Montgomery Pass, Smith Valley, Stateline, Sweetwater, Topaz Lake, and Yerington.

On September 5, 2024 Verizon announced that it would acquire Frontier Communications for $20 billion. This acquisition was completed on January 20, 2026. As a result, Verizon took control of Frontier's operations, including the former Verizon California assets that had been sold to Frontier.
