= Frontier Communications West Coast =

California-based telecom company

Frontier Communications West Coast, Inc.
- Industry: Telecommunications
- Founded: 1928
- Defunct: 2013
- Fate: Merged
- Successor: Citizens Telecommunications Company of California
- Products: Local Telephone Service

Frontier Communications West Coast, Inc. was a local telephone operating company owned by Frontier Communications through Frontier Communications Northwest serving the area around Crescent City, in Del Norte County, California.

It was founded in 1928 as the New West Coast Telephone Company. It later changed its name to West Coast Telephone Company of California, Inc., and was most recently known as Verizon West Coast, Inc. until 2010.

Upon its sale to Frontier Communications, the company gained its last name, Frontier Communications West Coast, Inc.

It was merged into Citizens Telecommunications Company of California in 2013.
