= Associated Telephone Utilities Company =

The Associated Telephone Utilities Company was a Wisconsin-based power company that went bankrupt in 1933, during the Great Depression. Prior to the Depression, the utility was a prominent player in the electrical power business in the Midwestern United States. An appeal by receivers appointed for the Associated Telephone Utilities Company was filed around April 1933, contesting the bankruptcy of the utility, and it was reorganized in 1934 as General Telephone. A chancellor in a court of chancery permitted the petition to be filed in United States District Court.

== Utility history ==
The Associated Telephone Utilities Company was founded in Wisconsin in 1926 by Sigurd Odegard. The company acquired the Indiana Telegraph Securities Company and its subsidiary companies in August 1929. The purchased utility operated 9,819 stations in Logansport, Indiana, and Greencastle, Indiana.

The Associated Telephone Utilities Company increased its budget for 1930 to $7,000,000, an increase of 40%. It invested $3,047,000 of this sum in the Western United States, with $2,493,850 spent in Los Angeles and the surrounding region. $553,500 was divided among Washington, Idaho, Nebraska, and Texas.

Five Wisconsin telephone operating companies were purchased by the Associated Telephone Utilities Company in August 1930. These utilities were consolidated with the Wisconsin properties of the Associated Telephone Utilities system.

A one-month sales campaign resulted in the addition of 1,040 phones in August 1931. During this period the Midwestern utility worked in unison with the Associated Telephone Utilities System in New York. For the year ending December 31, 1932, the firm realized a profit of $13,305 after taxes.
