= Oxford West Telephone =

Oxford West Telephone Company is a local telephone company in Maine and is owned by Maine-based Oxford Networks. The company was founded in 1994 upon Oxford's purchase of Contel of Maine's Oxford County exchanges from GTE.

The company absorbed the operations of Bryant Pond Telephone Co., which had been established in 1974, and adopted a trade name of the former company to reflect the merger.

The company provides local telephone services to cities such as Bryant Pond and Andover.
