= Frontier Florida =

Frontier Florida LLC
- Formerly: Peninsular Telephone Company; General Telephone Company of Florida; GTE Florida Incorporated; Verizon Florida, Inc. Verizon Florida LLC
- Type: Subsidiary
- Industry: Telecommunications
- Founded: 1901; 125 years ago
- Key people: William G. Brorein, Founder
- Products: Local Telephone Service
- Parent: GTE (1957-2000); Verizon (2000-2016, 2026-present); Frontier (2016-2026)
- Website: Frontier Florida

Frontier Florida LLC is a Frontier Communications operating company providing telephone service in Florida to former GTE and later Verizon regions.

== History ==
Frontier Florida was founded as the Peninsular Telephone Company by William G. Brorein in March 1901. Brorein, a politician from Ohio, arrived in Tampa in 1901. Noticing the boom in the South, he was convinced by friends to get in the telephone business. Peninsular Telephone began with only 100 telephone lines.

In 1957, the company was sold to General Telephone and Electronics (later GTE) and the name was changed to General Telephone Company of Florida.

The company was later renamed GTE Florida, Incorporated.

In 2000, GTE Florida was renamed "Verizon Florida", upon GTE's buyout by Bell Atlantic.

On April 1, 2016, Verizon Florida became "Frontier Florida" after Frontier Communications purchased all of Verizon wireline assets in Florida.

It serves the Central Florida and Tampa Bay regions.

== Sale to Frontier ==
On February 5, 2015, Verizon Communications announced a sale of its wired telecom operations in California, Florida, and Texas to Frontier Communications. Verizon Florida is included in the sale. The transaction closed on March 31, 2016.

Verizon Florida transitioned to Frontier Communications on April 1, 2016.

== Sale back to Verizon ==
On September 5, 2024 Verizon announced that it will acquire Frontier Communications for $20 billion. This acquisition was completed on January 20, 2026. As a result, Verizon took control of Frontier's operations, including regaining Frontier Florida.

== Sources ==
- Verizon Florida, Inc.
