= Citizens Telecommunications Company of California =

Californian telephone operating company

Verizon West Coast (Formerly Citizens Telecommunications Company of California Inc.) is a telephone operating company of Verizon Communications based in Elk Grove, California. It was established in 1993 to acquire 5,000 access lines from GTE. In 1996, it acquired 20,000 access lines from Alltel in the Tuolumne and Golden State areas. In 2007, Citizens acquired Global Valley Networks, serving Capay Valley, Livingston, and Patterson. In 2013, Frontier Communications West Coast, a former GTE property serving Crescent City, was merged into Citizens.

Its operations are separate from Frontier Communications of the Southwest, which serves former Verizon customers Frontier acquired in 2010.

On September 5, 2024 Verizon announced that it will acquire Frontier Communications for $20 billion. This acquisition was completed on January 20, 2026. As a result, Verizon took control of Frontier's operations, including regaining the former GTE access lines in California.

Citizens Telecommunications Company of California has Renamed to Verizon West Coast
