= Frontier North =

Telephone company

Frontier North, Inc.
- Formerly: Contel North, Inc. GTE North Incorporated; Verizon North, Inc.
- Type: Subsidiary
- Industry: Telecommunications
- Founded: 1992; 34 years ago
- Products: Local Telephone Service
- Parent: Contel (1992–1993); GTE (1993–2000); Verizon (2000–2010, 2026-present); Frontier (2010–2026)
- Website: www.frontier.com

Frontier North, Inc. is a local telephone operating company owned by Frontier Communications.

== History ==
Frontier North was founded as Contel North, Inc., incorporated in Wisconsin in 1992.

=== GTE acquisition of Contel ===
Contel was acquired by GTE in 1993. Following its acquisition by GTE, Contel North was renamed GTE North, Inc..

In 1993, Iowa, Missouri, Minnesota, and Nebraska were split off from GTE North into a new company called GTE Midwest, Inc. ConTel of Illinois, ConTel of Indiana, ConTel of Pennsylvania, and ConTel Quaker State were all merged into GTE North.

=== Acquisition by Verizon ===
In 2000, parent company GTE merged with Bell Atlantic, becoming Verizon Communications. At this point the company's name was legally changed to Verizon North, Inc.

=== Sale to Frontier ===
In 2009, Verizon Communications created a company, New Communications ILEC Holdings, to be sold to Frontier Communications. Verizon North was included with the new company. Frontier purchased the company in 2010. Verizon North's operations in Pennsylvania were spun off into a separate company called Verizon North Retain since those operations were not included in the sale to Frontier. That company was merged into a new company named Verizon North in 2010. The sale became final July 1, 2010, and the company's name was changed to Frontier North, Inc.

Frontier North, Inc. is a current operating company serving Illinois, Indiana, Michigan, Ohio, and Wisconsin.

=== Sale back to Verizon ===
On September 5, 2024 Verizon announced that it will acquire Frontier Communications for $20 billion. This acquisition was completed on January 20, 2026. As a result, Verizon took control of Frontier's operations, including regaining Frontier North.

== See also ==
- Frontier Midstates
- Verizon North

== Sources ==
- Verizon North, Inc.
