= Arthur W. Foshay =

American educator

Arthur Wellesley Foshay Jr. (1918–1998) was a school principal and consultant in California and Ohio, and director of the Bureau of Educational Research at Ohio State University. Born in Oakland, California, he was a graduate of the University of California, Berkeley, and attended the Teachers College at Columbia University, NY, and attained a doctorate in education.

Foshay was president of the Association for Supervision and Curriculum Development, president of the John Dewey Society, and a founder of the International Association for the Evaluation of Educational Attainment. He wrote several books and numerous articles for educational journals, was a consultant to school systems in this country and abroad, and was listed in "Who's Who in Education," "Who's Who in America," and "Who's Who in the World."

== Works ==
- Children's Social Values (1954) (with Kenneth D. Wann)
- The Rand McNally Handbook of Education (1963)
- The Professional as Educator (1970) (as editor)
- Transcendence and Mathematics
