= Verizon South =

Verizon South, Inc.
- Formerly: The Bluefield Telephone Corporation; Bluefield Telephone Company; General Telephone Company of the Southeast; General Telephone Company of the South; GTE South Incorporated
- Type: Subsidiary
- Industry: Telecommunications
- Founded: July 18, 1947; 79 years ago
- Area served: North Carolina, Virginia
- Products: Local Telephone Service
- Parent: GTE (1954-2000); Verizon (2000-present)
- Website: verizon.com

Verizon South, Inc. is a Verizon operating company providing local telephone services to portions of Virginia and North Carolina in the United States.

== History ==
Verizon South was originally established in 1947 as The Bluefield Telephone Corporation, providing telephone service to communities in Virginia including its namesake Bluefield. The company's first president was R. A. Phillips and was formally incorporated by Judson Large, Dean A. Esling, Richard L. Merrick, William W. Darrow, and Roland K. Smith, Jr.

The company changed its name to Bluefield Telephone Company on January 16, 1948.

=== Acquisition by GTE ===
Bluefield Telephone was acquired by GTE and in 1954 changed its name to General Telephone Company of the Southeast on June 25, 1954. The company began expansion under GTE ownership, absorbing a large group of telephone companies acquired in 1957. These companies included Durham Telephone Company of North Carolina, Georgia Continental Telephone Company, South Carolina Continental Telephone Company, Southeastern Carolina Telephone Company, Southern Continental Telephone Company, and Sumter Telephone Company. In 1970, the company absorbed more GTE companies, including General Telephone Company of Georgia, General Telephone Company of North Carolina, Mutual Telephone Company, Inc., Pee Dee Telephone Company, and United Telephone Co in Alabama.

In 1986, the company changed its name to General Telephone Company of the South, later shortening in 1988 to GTE South Incorporated. At this point, GTE South served Alabama, Georgia, Kentucky, North Carolina, South Carolina, Tennessee, Virginia, and West Virginia.

In 1993, GTE South operations in Tennessee and West Virginia were sold to Frontier Communications Citizens Utilities to become Citizens Telecommunications Company of Tennessee and Citizens Telecommunications Company of West Virginia, respectively. GTE South lines in Georgia were traded with Alltel's Illinois operations.

In 1994, former Contel companies Contel of Kentucky, Contel of North Carolina, Contel of South Carolina, and Contel of Virginia were legally merged into GTE South.

=== Acquisition by Verizon ===
In 2000, Bell Atlantic bought GTE, forming Verizon. GTE South was then renamed Verizon South, Inc.

In 2002, Verizon sold its operations in Alabama to CenturyTel, becoming CenturyTel of Alabama. Verizon also sold its operations in Kentucky to Alltel, becoming Kentucky ALLTEL (who later sold its wireline operations to Valor Telecom, renamed Windstream, and the operating company becoming Windstream Kentucky East).

==== Split ====
In 2010, operations in southern Illinois, southern Wisconsin, North Carolina (with the exception of Knotts Island), and South Carolina were included in a sale of Verizon assets, placed under the ownership of Frontier Communications ILEC Holdings, to Frontier Communications. The operations in those states became Frontier Communications of the Carolinas.

=== Today ===
Verizon South remains a current operating company of Verizon serving former GTE and Contel regions in Virginia and Knotts Island, North Carolina.
