= Frontier West Virginia =

Frontier West Virginia, Inc.
- Formerly: The Chesapeake and Potomac Telephone Company of West Virginia (1917–1994); Bell Atlantic - West Virginia, Inc. (1994–2000); Verizon West Virginia, Inc. (2000–2010)
- Company type: Subsidiary
- Industry: Telecommunications
- Predecessor: C&P Telephone of Maryland; Southern Bell
- Founded: 1917; 109 years ago
- Headquarters: Charleston, WV, USA
- Area served: West Virginia
- Products: Local Telephone Service
- Parent: AT&T (1917–1983); Bell Atlantic/Verizon (1984–2010, 2026–present); Frontier (2010–2026)
- Website: www.frontier.com/westvirginia

Frontier West Virginia, Inc. is one of the original Bell Operating Companies and provides local telephone service in the U.S. state of West Virginia.

== History ==
C&P Telephone of WV logo, 1964–1969

The Chesapeake and Potomac Telephone Company of West Virginia, originally part of the Bell System, was founded on January 1, 1917. C&P of WV took over telephone operations in West Virginia being served by Central District and Printing Telegraph Company, Southern Bell, and The Chesapeake and Potomac Telephone Company of Maryland.

Dial service was first introduced by C&P of West Virginia in 1925 to the Huntington central office.

=== Bell Atlantic ownership ===
In 1984, The Chesapeake and Potomac Telephone Company of West Virginia became a holding of Bell Atlantic, upon the divestiture of the Bell System by AT&T.

Charleston became the first city in the United States to have a choice of long-distance companies. By dialing "1" plus the area code and number, they could choose their long-distance carrier. Charleston was the nation's first test market for the service, allowing 34,000 customers to choose from one of eight long-distance companies serving the area.

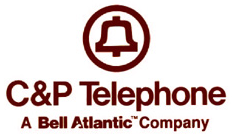
C&P Telephone logo, 1984-1994

C&P Telephone Co. of WV was the last Bell Atlantic company to provide party line telephone service. The last party line was converted to "private line" service on October 30, 1989.

In 1993, C&P Telephone of West Virginia took its last analog switch out of service, becoming the first Bell Operating Company to have 100% digital switching.

=== Name changes ===
In 1994, Bell Atlantic standardized all of its Bell Operating Company names, resulting in C&P Telephone of West Virginia being renamed Bell Atlantic – West Virginia, Inc. In 2000, upon its purchase of GTE, Bell Atlantic became Verizon Communications, resulting in the new name Verizon West Virginia, Inc.

=== Sale to Frontier ===
On July 1, 2010, Verizon transferred some local operations to a new subsidiary, New Communications ILEC Holdings, which was sold to Frontier Communications. Included in the sale was Verizon West Virginia, which became Frontier West Virginia, Inc. Even though Frontier was not started as a Baby Bell, the FCC determined that Frontier West Virginia is still responsible to uphold obligations expected of Bell Operating Companies outlined in the Telecommunications Act of 1996. The company operates separately from Citizens Telecommunications Company of West Virginia, Frontier's other provider in the state, which it already owned prior to the purchase from Verizon.

=== Sale back to Verizon ===
On September 5, 2024, Verizon announced that it will buy Frontier Communications for $20 billion. This acquisition was completed on January 20, 2026. As a result, Verizon took control of Frontier's operations, including regaining Frontier West Virginia.
