= Ogden Telephone (Iowa company) =

Ogden Telephone Company is a telecommunications provider based in Ogden, Iowa. It was formally incorporated in 1904, but was providing services since at least 1900, having been organized by some twenty farmers living south of Odgen.

Currently, the company is a local provider offering high-speed fiber-optic internet, digital television, and phone services to the town of Ogden and Boone County. In 2005, the company joined an investment consortium with 12 of about 150 Iowa telephone companies to invest in Voice over IP (VoIP) telephony technology from WebPoint Communications in West Des Moines, Iowa. In 2019, the company partnered with the City of Boone government to install fiber-optic cable underground to all residences within city limits, beginning with the southeastern quadrant of Boone, and thus enhancing data throughput speeds by a factor of more than 30.

Ogden Telephone has been a member of the Iowa Telecommunications Association, and it sponsors local events and holiday attractions.
