= Citizens Telecommunications Company of West Virginia =

Local telephone service company in West Virginia, US

- Trade name: Frontier Communications of West Virginia
- Type: Subsidiary
- Industry: Telecommunications
- Founded: 1897; 129 years ago
- Products: Local Telephone Service
- Parent: Alltel (until 1995); Citizens/Frontier (1995-2026); Verizon (2026-present)
- Website: www.frontier.com

Citizens Telecommunications Company of West Virginia is the local exchange carrier of telephone service in some regions in West Virginia.

The company was founded in 1897 as the Short Line Telephone Company. In 1975, the company changed its name to Mountain State Telephone Company. In 1995, the company became Citizens Mountain State Telephone Company in 1995 upon its acquisition from Alltel. The company operated separately from Citizens' existing operations in West Virginia that operated under the Citizens Telecommunications Company of West Virginia name.

In 2000, Citizens Mountain State absorbed the former GTE operations that Citizens acquired in 1994. At this point, Citizens Mountain State Telephone Company then changed its name to Citizens Telecommunications Company of West Virginia.

In 2001, the company began doing business as Frontier Communications of West Virginia.

The company operates separately from Frontier West Virginia, regulated as a Bell Operating Company, which was acquired by Frontier in 2010.

On September 5, 2024, Verizon announced that it will acquire Frontier Communications for $20 billion. This acquisition was completed on January 20, 2026. As a result, Verizon took control of Frontier's operations, including Citizens Telecommunications Company of West Virginia, and Frontier West Virginia returned to Verizon ownership in the same deal.
