= Tom Bevill =

American politician (1921–2005)

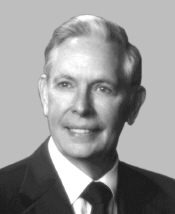

Member of the U.S. House of Representatives from Alabama
- In office January 3, 1967 – January 3, 1997
- Preceded by: James D. Martin (7th); Bill Nichols (4th)
- Succeeded by: Walter Flowers (7th); Robert Aderholt (4th)
- Constituency: 7th district (1967-73); 4th district (1973-97)

Member of the Alabama House of Representatives
- In office 1958–1966

Personal details
- Born: Tom Donald Fike Bevill; March 27, 1921 Townley, Alabama, U.S.
- Died: March 28, 2005 (aged 84) Jasper, Alabama, U.S.
- Party: Democratic
- Education: University of Alabama
- Tom Bevill's voice Tom Bevill speaks in support of the Colorado Ute Indian Water Rights Settlement Act of 1988; Recorded October 3, 1988

Tom Donald Fike Bevill (March 27, 1921 – March 28, 2005) was an American attorney, politician, and Democratic fifteen-term U.S. congressman who represented Alabama's 4th Congressional District and Alabama's 7th congressional district from 1967 to 1997.

== Early years and education ==
Bevill was born in Townley, Alabama, on March 27, 1921. He attended Walker County High School, the University of Alabama School of Commerce and Business Administration, and the University of Alabama School of Law. Bevill was an initiate of the Gamma Alpha chapter of Pi Kappa Alpha at UA. He served in the United States Army during World War II. He also privately practiced law.

== Political career ==
In 1958, Bevill was elected to the Alabama Legislature, serving there until his election to Congress in 1966. Bevill served 15 two-year terms in the House of Representatives from Alabama's 4th and 7th Congressional districts, from 1967 to 1997. In Congress, Bevill was known for securing federal money and development projects for his district. This earned him the nickname "The King of Pork", a term which he actually turned into a positive. After fifteen terms in Congress, he retired in 1997. Bevill is credited with answering the world's very first 9-1-1 emergency call on February 16, 1968, made from Haleyville by then-Alabama House Speaker Rankin Fite at the invitation of the Alabama Telephone Company. He also sponsored the Bevill Amendment to the Resource Conservation and Recovery Act which excludes mining wastes from the act's jurisdiction.

Bevill voted for the Abandoned Shipwrecks Act of 1987. The Act asserts United States title to certain abandoned shipwrecks located on or embedded in submerged lands under state jurisdiction, and transfers title to the respective state, thereby empowering states to manage these cultural and historical resources more efficiently, with the goal of preventing treasure hunters and salvagers from damaging them. President Ronald Reagan signed it into law on April 28, 1988.

== Personal life ==
Bevill died on March 28, 2005, in Jasper, Alabama, the day after his 84th birthday. He had been in declining health for several years due to heart problems. In 2004, he received triple-bypass heart surgery.

His son Don Bevill ran for his old seat in 1998. He lost 56%-44% to his father's Republican successor Robert Aderholt.

== Honors ==
Bevill was inducted into the Alabama Academy of Honor in 1986.

U.S. House of Representatives
Preceded by James D. Martin	Member of the U.S. House of Representatives from Alabama's 7th congressional district 1967–1973	Succeeded by Walter Flowers
Preceded by Bill Nichols	Member of the U.S. House of Representatives from Alabama's 4th congressional district 1973–1997	Succeeded by Robert Aderholt
