= Rankin Fite =

American politician (1916-1980)

Speaker of the Alabama House of Representatives
- In office 1967–1971
- Preceded by: Albert P. Brewer
- Succeeded by: G. Sage Lyons
- In office 1955–1957
- Preceded by: Roberts H. Brown
- Succeeded by: Charles C. Adams
- Constituency: 55th (1955–1957); 59th (1967–1971)

Member of the Alabama House of Representatives
- In office 1950–1974

Personal details
- Born: September 1, 1916 Montgomery, Alabama
- Died: November 6, 1980 (aged 64) Hamilton, Alabama
- Party: Democratic
- Spouse: Ruby Alene Morris
- Children: Ernest Adams
- Education: University of Alabama

Ernest Rankin Fite (September 1, 1916 – November 6, 1980) was an Alabama state legislator and attorney.

== Biography ==
Fite was born in Montgomery, Alabama to Ernest Baxter and Minnie Watt Fite. His grandfather, Bloomer Rankin Fite, established a firm and practiced law in the Hamilton, Alabama area in the 1880s, with four of his sons, including Ernest Rankin's father. Ernest Baxter Fite also served in the Alabama House of Representatives and Alabama Senate for Marion County, Alabama.

Fite graduated from the University of Alabama with a LL.B degree in 1939 and joined his family firm after being admitted to the bar. He was commissioned as a second lieutenant for World War II where he went overseas to fly as a navigator. After the war, he returned to law practice in 1945.

He was elected to the Alabama Senate in 1946 and served as a floor leader. He ran successfully for the House of Representatives in 1950 and served five consecutive terms there, serving as speaker on two occasions. While serving in the house and senate, Fite also served as bank director for the Bank of Hackleburg and president of the Marion County Banking Company. During his time in the house, he sought improvements to his hometown of Hamilton, revamping streets and sewer systems.

On February 16, 1968, Fite, then Speaker of the House, placed the ceremonial first 9-1-1 call from the town of Haleyville at the invitation of the Alabama Telephone Company. The emergency system had been rushed into service by the Alabama Telephone Company in an effort to show the innovative prowess of the independent telephone industry. Fite's call was answered by then-Congressman Tom Bevill.

He retired from politics in 1974 due to failing health, having suffered from Parkinson's disease prior to retiring. He died of a heart attack in 1980. He was married in 1941 to Ruby Alene Morris with whom he had one son, Ernest Adams.

Upon his death in 1980, Fite was described as "one of the most masterful members of the state legislature". Former governor George C. Wallace commented that "[today was] truly a sad day, as we experience the loss of a man who in legislative circles had already become a legend".
