= Hematite, Virginia =

Unincorporated community in Virginia, United States

Coordinates: 37°44′23″N 80°10′34″W

Hematite is an unincorporated community in Alleghany County, Virginia, United States.
