= Jacks Valley (Nevada) =

Valley in Douglas County, Nevada, United States

Coordinates: 39°05′02″N 119°49′44″W

Jacks Valley is a valley in the U.S. state of Nevada.

Jacks Valley was named after Jack Redden(Return Jackson Redden), its initial settler.
