= Frontier California =

American regional landline phone service

Verizon California, Inc.
- Type: Subsidiary
- Industry: Telecommunications
- Founded: 1929; 97 years ago
- Products: Local Telephone Service
- Revenue: US$ 8.6 billion (2019)
- Number of employees: 21,200 (2019)
- Parent: GTE (1929-2000); Verizon (2000-2016, 2026-present); Frontier (2016-2026)
- Website: Verizon.com

Verizon California, Inc. is a Verizon Communications-owned operating company providing telephone service in Verizon regions. This included Southern California cities such as Long Beach, Seal Beach, Lakewood, Norwalk and Santa Monica.

== History ==
GTE was originally the largest non-Bell System telephone company, and the number-two telephone service provider in the United States. It entered California by acquiring the Associated Telephone Company in 1926. It would later merge with Western Utilities Corporation and its affiliates in 1964; the number-three (non-Bell System) provider, Continental Telephone (ConTel), in 1991; and former Bell System member Bell Atlantic in 2000.

GTE was made up of many small "mom and pop" telephone companies that had been purchased to form the General Telephone System, this led the California Public Utilities Commission, in the mid-1960s to proclaim GTE "the worst telephone company in California, bar none." However, in the years following the report, GTE replaced most of its switching equipment, and much of its plant in Southern California. This led to a higher level of service compared to Pacific Bell.

When the 213 area code was being split into 213 and 310, Pacific Bell, then the manager of the 213 area code, chose to split the 213 area code in such a fashion that every single prefix that served a GTE customer was moved into the new 310 area code, while many of Pacific Bell's customers remained in the 213 area code.

GTE California completed the transition from mechanical to electronic switching by 1992.

In the 1990s, GTE California underwent several changes. In 1993, GTE purchased ConTel. Its subsidiary ConTel of California, Inc., which also served parts of Nevada and Arizona, was absorbed into GTE California.

In 2000, GTE was purchased by Bell Atlantic, becoming Verizon. GTE California was then renamed "Verizon California, Inc."

In 2010, operations in Arizona, Nevada, and some of California (mostly in areas near state borders), including some former Contel of California regions, were sold to Frontier Communications, becoming Frontier Communications of the Southwest.

== Sale to Frontier ==
On February 5, 2015, Verizon Communications announced a sale of its remaining wired telecom operations in California, Florida, and Texas to Frontier Communications. Verizon California is included in the sale. The transaction closed in the first half of 2016.

Verizon California transitioned to Frontier Communications on April 1, 2016.

== Sale back to Verizon ==
On September 5, 2024 Verizon announced that it will acquire Frontier Communications for $20 billion. This acquisition was completed on January 20, 2026. As a result, Verizon took control of Frontier's operations, including regaining Frontier California.

Frontier California has Renamed back to Verizon California

== Sources ==
- FCC History: Verizon California, Inc.
