= Wilbur B. Foshay =

American businessman

Wilbur Burton Foshay
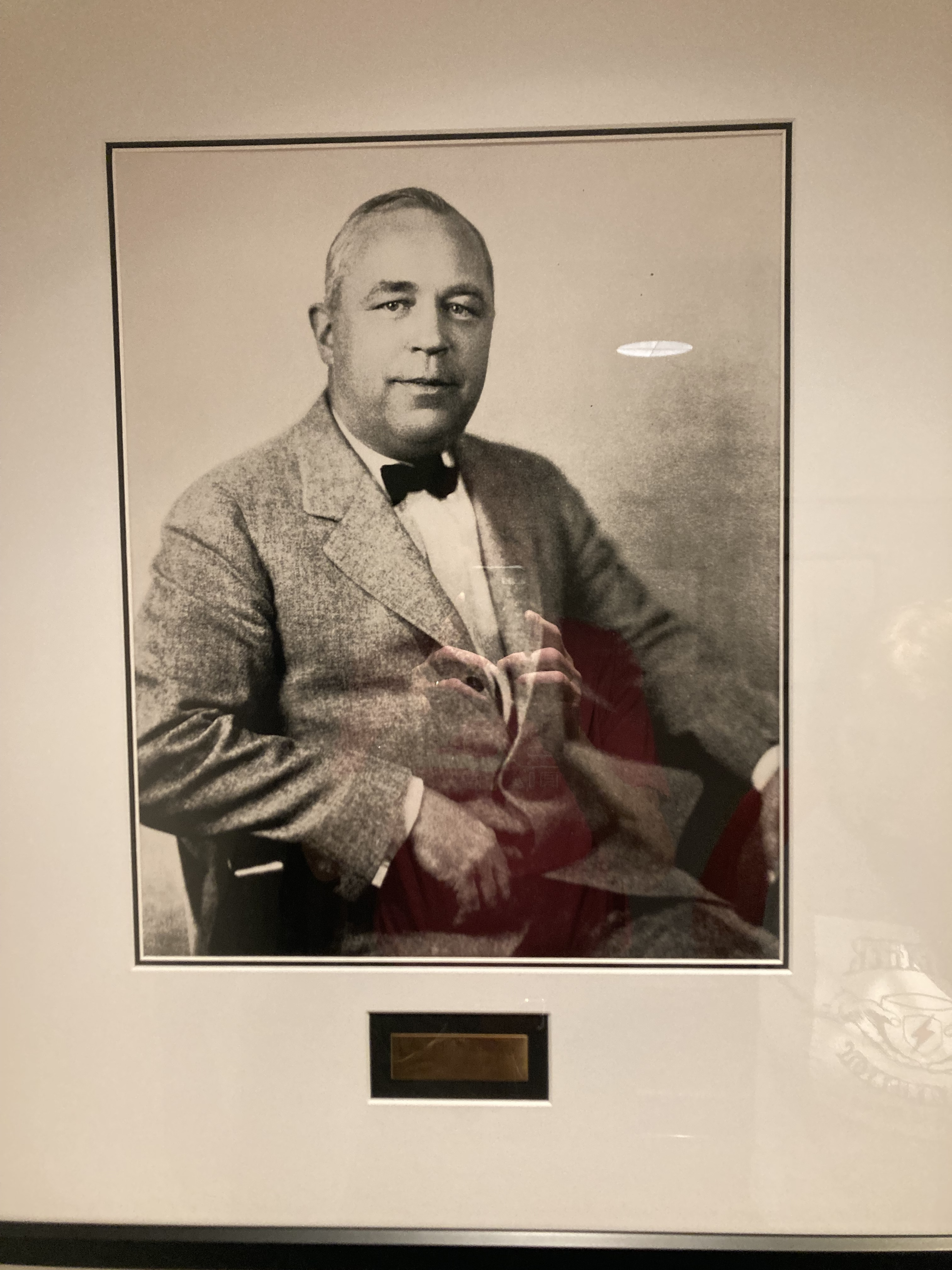
- Portrait of Wilbur B. Foshay
- Born: December 12, 1881; Ossining, New York, U.S.
- Died: September 1, 1957; Hastings, Minnesota
- Education: Columbia University
- Occupation: Entrepreneur

Wilbur Burton Foshay (1881–1957) was an American businessman, who built a fortune buying utilities throughout the Midwest in the early 20th century and built the Foshay Tower in Minneapolis, Minnesota, which opened in August 1929.

== Career ==
Born in Ossining, New York, Foshay graduated from the Mount Pleasant Military Academy of Ossining. He then worked as a timekeeper, gas piper, and electrician for the United Gas Improvement Company located in Tarrytown, New York. Originally intending to become an artist, he attended Columbia University until his father's business failed and could no longer support his education.

In 1906, Foshay moved to Hutchinson, Kansas to manage their local power and light company. He married the daughter of the owner, Leota Hutchinson Fox. They moved around the country as Foshay continued to work utility jobs.

In 1915, the family settled in Minneapolis where Foshay worked for Page and Hill who manufactured electric light poles and telephone poles. One year later, he borrowed $6,000 and purchased the Ponca Electric Company of Nebraska and incorporated the W.B. Foshay Company as a public utilities holding company in 1917.

By 1928, Foshay's company owned utilities in 30 states and the then-territory of Alaska, Canada, and Central America. He built the Foshay Tower as his headquarters, which at-the-time was the tallest building between Chicago and the West Coast. The building cost $3.75 million to build and was built with union labor in a non-union town. On September 1, 1929, he hosted an extravagant 3-day dedication ceremony and a special march written by John Philip Sousa for the occasion.

When the stock market crashed in 1929, Foshay lost everything. Foshay had previously been extended credit by the local Northwest Bank, but when the bank called in loans after the crash of the market, Foshay was unable to secure the required $300,000 to pay. His companies went into operating receivership on November 1, 1929, and Joseph Chapman was named the Receiver of all Foshay's companies.

In 1930, the Department of Justice began to investigate the Foshay company for misrepresenting stock solicitations to the investor via the mail. Originally, the U.S. District Attorney and state prosecutor did not pursue charges, but Chapman insisted. Foshay was indicted on charges of mail fraud in 1931, as he had used the federal postal service to advertise and sell stock in his company, and some of that stock was likely overvalued.

== Foshay's trial ==
Foshay, Henry H. Henley, Harry McGinty, Clarence Salisbury, Palmer Mabry, Herbert Welch, and Raymond Andrus were tried on 17 criminal counts of violating the U.S. Postal laws. He was accused of using the mail to sell stock and pay dividends in a fraudulent manner. Foshay and Henley hired Josiah Brill and Samuel Maslon to defend them, a firm which had never tried a criminal case. Foshay saw the case as about accounting rather than criminal matters.

On September 1, 1931, Judge Molyneaux began conducting voir dire and twelve jurors were selected. The government spent September 3-29 presenting 400 exhibits and 60 witness testimonies. Brill presented no testamony and argued that Foshay had differed only in accounting methods, and committed only an error in judgement, not a criminal offense. Foshay claimed he was colorblind to explain peculiar marks in his accounting books—"in the red" and "in the black" were marked by symbols rather than ink color, when really these marks represented which entries were artificially inflated. The trial lasted six weeks. The jury deliberated, but the vote was 11-1 for conviction. Genevieve Clark was the sole dissenter, and a mistrial was declared.

It was later discovered that Genevieve Clark had worked for the Foshay Company at one time. Her husband, real estate agent and former banker Daniel D. Clark, was also friendly with one of Foshay's co-defendants. Clark was charged with contempt of court, which was presided over by Judge Nordbye. She was sentenced to six months in prison and fined $1000. Clark appealed to the Eighth Circuit Court of Appeals, presided over by Judge John B. Sanborn, and the U.S. Supreme Court and failed. Justice Benjamin Cardozo wrote the opinion in an unanimous decision by the Supreme Court, observing that Clark had withheld information that anyone could be expected to know was relevant. Additional information that was not discussed in the Supreme Court decision were that Clark had stated her desire to be on the Jury, her name appeared handwritten on the clerk's desk in the jury pool, and she had met with her husband during the trial. Clark was ordered to surrender on April 24, 1933. Instead, she and her family disappeared. Clark, her husband and two young boys were found dead from intentional carbon monoxide poisoning on April 28, 1933. The family is buried at Forest Lawn Cemetery in Maplewood.

A retrial was scheduled to begin on January 11, 1932. A week before the second trial began, McGinty, Salisbury, Andrus, Mabry, and Welch pled guilty to one of the 17 counts of fraud and nolo contendere to the other 16 counts. They received probation and a fine. As the second trial began, the attorney Brill was still owed $8,000 by the defendants. On March 21, 1932, Foshay and Henley were found guilty on four of the 17 counts of fraud. He was sentenced to 15 years in prison and fined $1,000, and given a stay of sentence for two years, pending appeals. Henley wrote his own appeal brief, and the Eighth Circuit Court of Appeals affirmed the District Court.

After a letter-writing campaign of over 10,000 requests for pardon organized by Frazer Arnold, President Franklin Roosevelt commuted 10 years from Foshay's sentence. Foshay only actually served three years in Leavenworth because of "good behavior." President Harry Truman granted Foshay a full and unconditional pardon in 1947. The remnants of this third company became the basis for Citizens Utilities (as of 2025, now subsumed into Verizon via its acquisition of Frontier Communications).

== Later life ==
After his pardon Foshay moved to Arizona and Salida, Colorado where he worked with local chambers of commerce. Destitute, in 1957 he moved back to Minnesota to live with his son's family. That year he had a stroke and soon died on the twenty-eighth anniversary of the Foshay Tower's debut.
