= Ogden Telephone (New York company) =

Telephone operating company in New York State

Ogden Telephone Company was a telephone operating company primarily owned by Don and Maxine Davison. It then was acquired by Citizens Utilities in 1997, which then became Frontier Communications. It provided service to Spencerport, New York. It was founded in 1907.

On September 5, 2024 Verizon announced that it will acquire Frontier Communications for $20 billion. This acquisition was completed on January 20, 2026. As a result, Verizon took control of Frontier's operations, including Ogden Telephone Company.
