= Ziply Fiber =

American telecommunications company

Northwest Fiber, LLC
- Trade name: Ziply Fiber
- Type: Subsidiary
- Industry: Telecommunications
- Predecessors: Northwest divisions of: GTE (1964–2000) Verizon (2000–2010) Frontier (2010–2020)
- Founded: 1964; 62 years ago
- Headquarters: Kirkland, Washington, U.S.
- Area served: Washington, Oregon, Idaho, Montana
- Key people: Steve Weed; (Executive chairman); Harold Zeitz; (CEO)
- Products: Internet service Digital television Telephone Services
- Parent: BCE Inc.
- ASN: 20055
- Website: ziplyfiber.com

Northwest Fiber, LLC, doing business as Ziply Fiber, is an American telecommunications company based in Kirkland, Washington. On August 1, 2025, BCE Inc completed its acquisition of Ziply Fiber.

The firm operates fiber-optic broadband services in the Pacific Northwest, serving 1.3 million residential and business customers in Washington, Oregon, Idaho, and Montana. It has major offices in Everett, Washington, Beaverton, Oregon, and Hayden, Idaho.

The company has its origins in the northwestern division of GTE, which became part of Verizon in 2000. It was then sold by Verizon to Frontier Communications in 2010.

In 2019, WaveDivision Capital announced that it would acquire Frontier's northwestern operations for $1.35 billion—after that, the services were rebranded as Ziply Fiber. In 2025, BCE purchased Ziply Fiber.

== History ==
General Telephone Company of the Northwest, Inc. was founded in 1964, following the acquisition of the West Coast Telephone Company, and later became GTE Northwest, Inc. GTE Northwest originally served Idaho, Montana, Oregon, and Washington.

In 1993, GTE acquired Continental Telephone (ConTel); as a result, ConTel operations in Oregon, Washington, and Idaho were merged into GTE Northwest. In 1994, GTE sold ConTel of Idaho to Citizens Communications, which later became Frontier Communications. In 1995, GTE sold operations in Montana to Citizens Communications and absorbed ConTel of Oregon into GTE's existing Oregon operations.

In 2000, Bell Atlantic acquired GTE, forming Verizon. As a result, GTE Northwest was renamed Verizon Northwest, Inc. It continued to provide local telephone service to former GTE regions and some ConTel regions in Idaho, Washington and Oregon.

In July 2010, Verizon Northwest, along with other Verizon wireline operations predominately in the western U.S., were acquired by Frontier Communications. In May 2019, WaveDivision Capital (WDC)—a company led by Wave Broadband founder Steve Weed and other former executives, with backing from Searchlight Capital—announced that it would acquire Frontier Communications Northwest for $1.35 billion.

Weed stated that the company planned to "invest further in our markets, specifically by extending fiber to more homes and businesses, to bring them the high speeds they want." The new company is unrelated to Wave Broadband, with the company stating that although Weed has remained on its board of directors following its sale to TPG Capital, it was not involved in the transaction or the company.

In February 2020, the Washington Utilities and Transport Commission approved the sale of Frontier Northwest to WDC via Northwest Fiber, LLC; as a condition of the acquisition, the company agreed to invest at least $50 million towards expanding its broadband coverage in the state of Washington. In March, Northwest Fiber announced that it would brand its operations as Ziply Fiber; the firm would retain Frontier's nearly 1,000 employees in the region, and pledged to invest $100 million in improvements and expansions to its network. The sale was completed on May 1, 2020.

In September 2024, the company completed its purchase of Wenatchee, Washington-based LocalTel Communications for an undisclosed amount, adding more than 40,000 customers and over 150 employees to the firm.

In November 2024, Canadian telecom company BCE announced that it would acquire Ziply for $3.6 billion, intending to expand its network to serve three million customers. In August of the following year, upon completion of the acquisition, BCE stated that Ziply Fiber would remain a separate business unit.
