= Global Crossing =

U.S. telecommunications company (1997–2011)

Global Crossing Limited
- Industry: Telecommunications
- Founded: March 1997; 29 years ago
- Founder: Gary Winnick; David L. Lee
- Defunct: October 3, 2011; 14 years ago
- Fate: Acquired by Level 3 Communications which was acquired by CenturyLink (now Lumen Technologies)
- Headquarters: Hamilton, Bermuda
- Key people: John Legere (CEO)
- Revenue: US$2.536 billion (2009)
- Net income: -US$141 million (2009)
- Number of employees: 5,235 (2009)

Global Crossing Limited was a telecommunications company that provided computer networking services and operated a tier 1 carrier. It maintained a large backbone network and offered peering, virtual private networks, leased lines, audio and video conferencing, long-distance telephone, managed services, dialup, colocation centres and VoIP. Its customer base ranged from individuals to large enterprises and other carriers, with emphasis on higher-margin layered services such as managed services and VoIP with leased lines. Its core network delivered services to more than 700 cities in more than 70 countries.

Global Crossing was the first global communications provider with IPv6 natively deployed in both its private and public networks. It was legally domiciled in Bermuda and had its administrative headquarters in New Jersey.

In 1999, during the dot-com bubble, the company was valued at US$47 billion, but it never had a profitable year. In 2002, the company filed for one of the largest bankruptcies in history and its executives were accused of covering up an accounting scandal. On October 3, 2011, Global Crossing was acquired by Level 3 Communications for $3 billion, including the assumption of $1.1 billion in debt.

== History ==
=== Founding and early growth ===
In March 1997, Global Crossing was founded by Gary Winnick, the former manager of the bond desk of Drexel Burnham Lambert, and his Drexel colleagues who moved on to work at Canadian Imperial Bank of Commerce (CIBC): Abbott L. Brown, David L. Lee, and Barry Porter. In 1997, the company raised $35 million, including investments by Winnick and the CIBC Argosy Merchant Funds (later Trimaran Capital Partners). Winnick was chairman of the company from 1997 until 2002. In 1998, he hired Lodwrick Cook, former CEO of Atlantic Richfield Company, as co-chairman. John Scanlon became the first CEO of the company in the same year, but was replaced in March 1999 by Robert Annunziata, who had resigned as president of AT&T Corporation's Business Services group to "build a company from start to finish".

In May 1999, Global Crossing made an offer to acquire US West, but was outbid by Qwest. In July 1999, the company acquired Global Marine Systems, the undersea cable maintenance arm of Cable & Wireless, for $885 million. Later that year, in September 1999, the company acquired Frontier Communications, the former Rochester Telephone Corporation, for $9.9 billion and renamed it Global Crossing North America. That same month, Global Crossing acquired 49% of SB Submarine Systems, and formed Asia Global Crossing, a $1.3 billion joint venture with SoftBank Group and Microsoft to build a fiber-optic network in Asia linking Japan, China, Singapore, Hong Kong, Taiwan, South Korea, Malaysia and the Philippines. In November 1999, Global Crossing acquired Racal Telecom for $1.65 billion.

In January 2000, the company formed a 50/50 joint venture with Hutchison Whampoa, valued at $1.2 billion, for a fiber-optic network in Hong Kong. In March 2000, Annunziata resigned, receiving $160 million during his 13-month tenure. Leo Hindery, who had joined the company a few months earlier as head of its web hosting division, GlobalCenter, then became CEO. In September 2000, the company announced a deal to sell GlobalCenter to Exodus Communications for $6.5 billion in stock. By the time the deal closed in January 2001, the stock was only worth $1.95 billion. Hindery then resigned as CEO and was replaced with Thomas Casey, a lawyer who came to Global Crossing from Merrill Lynch, where he was co-head of the global telecom investment banking group. For the year 2000, the company lost $1.4 billion.

In 2001, the company sold its local telephone operations and the Frontier name in 2001 to Frontier Communications for $3.65 billion in cash. In the summer of 2001, the company began discussing a transaction with Enron in which the company would pay Enron $650 million for its fiber-optic network in exchange for Enron paying the company $650 million to use the network, a move that would boost both companies' revenues without costing them anything. The transaction did not materialize. In October 2001, Casey was replaced by John Legere, the CEO of Global Crossing subsidiary Asia Global Crossing.

=== Bankruptcy and reemergence ===
In the fourth quarter of 2001, the company lost $3.4 billion on revenue of $793 million. In January 2002, the company filed bankruptcy. It listed total assets of $22.4 billion and debts of $12.4 billion and was paying annual interest of $600 million. As part of the bankruptcy, Hutchison Whampoa and ST Telemedia agreed to invest $750 million in the company. Hutchinson Whampoa later pulled out of the deal due to regulatory resistance.

CIBC realized an estimated gain of $2 billion from its relatively small equity investment in the company, making it one of the most profitable investments by a financial institution in the 1990s. Winnick salvaged $735 million from his $20 million investment, although his interest was worth $6 billion on paper at its peak.

In April 2002, Hutchinson Whampoa bought the company's 50% interest in the Hong Kong joint venture for $120 million.

In November 2002, Global Crossing's Asian subsidiary, Asia Global Crossing, filed bankruptcy and sold its assets to Asia Netcom, a subsidiary of China Netcom.

Between 1998 and 2001, Winnick sold approximately $420 million in company stock and other executives sold an additional $900 million in company stock.

On December 9, 2003, the company emerged from bankruptcy and on April 1, 2004, the company once again became a public company.

In March 2004, Gary Winnick and other ex-executives settled lawsuits filed by investors and former employees accusing the executives of committing securities fraud by using improper accounting to inflate the company's revenue.

In October 2006, the company announced the acquisition of UK-based Fibernet Corp. for £49.8 million.

In May 2007, the company acquired Impsat, a leading Argentine telecommunications company. Global Crossing and Impsat have had a commercial relationship since 2000, when Global Crossing selected Impsat as one of its providers of Point of Presence (PoP) facilities for Global Crossing's Latin American network, known as South American Crossing. Impsat has also been a customer of Global Crossing in Latin America since 2000.

In October 2011, Level 3 Communications acquired the company for $3 billion, including the assumption of $1.1 billion in debt.

== Controversies ==
=== Political activity ===
The company contributed $250,000 to each of the 2000 Republican National Convention and the 2000 Democratic National Convention and made major contributions to politicians of both parties. The company also courted politicians to invest in the company. The company hired lobbyist and former United States Assistant Attorney General Anne Bingaman, married to Democratic New Mexico Senator Jeff Bingaman, paying her $2.5 million between January and June 1999 to try to block licensing of an AT&T, MCI, and Sprint consortium to lay cable from the U.S. to Japan.

=== Executive bonuses ===
Despite the massive layoffs, unpaid employees, and cancelled pensions as a result of the 2002 bankruptcy, executives received huge bonuses and loan relief.

== Russian submarine rescue ==
In August 2000, the company was involved in an attempted rescue of a Russian submarine during the Kursk submarine disaster. Global Crossing's undersea cable division contracted with British Defense Ministry to operate the LR5 rescue submersible. As part of the agreement, Global Crossing was to keep it on call for emergencies.
