= Frontier Telephone of Rochester =

Subsidiary

Frontier Telephone of Rochester, Inc.
- Formerly: Rochester Telephone Corporation
- Type: Private (Subsidiary of Frontier)
- Industry: Telecommunications
- Founded: 1920; 106 years ago
- Headquarters: Rochester, New York, United States
- Products: Local Telephone Service
- Parent: Global Crossing (1999–2001); Citizens/Frontier (2001–2026); Verizon (2026-present)
- Website: www.frontier.com

Frontier Telephone of Rochester, Inc., formerly Rochester Telephone Corporation, is a local telephone operating company of Frontier Communications providing telephone service to Rochester, New York. It was founded in 1920 to consolidate local phone operations in the Rochester area and was notable as being an independent telephone company during the peak of the Bell System's near monopoly of phone service in the United States. The company changed its name to Frontier in 1994. It was acquired by Global Crossing in 1999, which then sold it to Citizens Communications in 2001. Citizens took the Frontier name in 2008, becoming Frontier Communications. Frontier Communications was acquired by Verizon in 2026.

== History ==
=== Early history ===
The company was originally listed as the Rochester Telephonic Exchange in 1877, and was an affiliate of the Bell Telephone Company. It separated from the Bell system in 1899 as the Home Telephone Company. The name was changed to Rochester Telephone Company later that same year. It initially had about 1,800 customers but did not offer long distance calls, which had to be made via a different company and a different telephone. This continued until 1920, when it became the Rochester Telephone Corporation, and offered local and long distance calling on the same lines using the same equipment.

RTC was nicknamed "Rochester Tel". The company used a marketing tag line during this time, "Rochester Tel and You—The Perfect Connection". This reflected the company's commitment to marketing through a partnership with the local community. The company was one of the first in the nation to offer a caller ID service to its customers. A trial of this service in the early 1990s was one of the first in the United States. Customers located in the Perinton area with a telephone number beginning with "223" or "425" had the chance to participate in a trial of this service and other CLASS calling features which were making their debut in New York at that time.

In 1993, then Rochester Telephone Corporation, the company became the first telephone company to open its local telephone lines to competition. Time Warner and AT&T were among the leading competitors; AT&T later withdrew.

=== Frontier Corporation (1995-1999) ===
In 1995, the company repositioned itself as a holding company named Frontier Corporation, while its local operations became Frontier Telephone of Rochester. The company also operated a wireless subsidiary called Frontier Cellular. It was a joint venture with Bell Atlantic.

=== Global Crossing North America (1999-2001) ===
Frontier's investment in fiber long lines proved attractive in the exploding global communications market in the late 1990s when it was acquired in 1999 by Global Crossing, a Bermuda-based communications network enterprise. The holding company adopted the name Global Crossing North America, Inc.

=== Citizens Communications/Frontier Communications (2001–2026) ===
Citizens Communications acquired Global's local exchange properties, including the Frontier brand, in 2001.

Under the Frontier brand, Citizens Communications provided telephone, television and Internet services in 24 states. On July 31, 2008, Citizens Communications adopted the Frontier name, becoming Frontier Communications.

=== Verizon (2026-present) ===
On September 5, 2024, Verizon announced its intent to acquire Frontier for $20 billion, in a move to expand its fiber internet services. The acquisition was approved by Frontier shareholders in November 2024. On January 15, 2026, the California Public Utilities Commission approved Verizon's acquisition of Frontier, with the deal completed on January 20. Under Verizon ownership, this company is legally separate from Verizon New York, which is the former Bell System unit serving other locations across New York state that has been under the ownership of Verizon (and its predecessors Bell Atlantic and NYNEX) since the 1984 Bell System breakup.
