= Contel =

Former US phone company

ConTel Corporation
- Type: Public
- Industry: Communications Services
- Founded: 1958; 68 years ago
- Defunct: 1991; 35 years ago
- Fate: Acquired
- Successor: GTE
- Headquarters: Atlanta, Georgia
- Products: Internet access, Local wireline and wireless telecommunication services

ConTel Corporation (Continental Telephone or simply Contel) was the third-largest independent phone company in the United States prior to it being acquired by GTE in 1991.

== History ==
Contel was founded in 1961 by Charles Wohlstetter, Philip J. Lucier, and Jack Maguire. Continental was formed with the acquisition of the 2,000‐station Millstadt, Illinois telephone exchange. Lucier was the company's president until his death on July 24, 1970, after a bomb exploded in a company automobile in the parking lot of the Pierre Laclede Center in Clayton, Missouri. Lucier was in the driver's seat at the time of the explosion. He was 49 years old and had left behind 11 children. Although the murder was never solved, detectives concluded that Lucier's death was unintentional. Just before he parked his car in the parking lot, a lawyer pulled away from the spot. Both men's vehicles were black, contained phone antennas, and had four-digit license plates. It was generally accepted that the bomb was originally meant for the attorney (as at that point, he was representing two con men who angered the local mafia, which then led to the assassination attempt).

In 1980, Contel purchased Network Analysis Corp, then the largest information technology consulting company in the world. As a result of this purchase, future Internet Hall of Fame pioneer Howard Frank served as president and CEO of Contel Information Systems, a subsidiary of Contel Corporation from 1969 until 1985.

In 1986 ConTel of Indiana broke precedent and rescinded a 25¢ increase in their rates after a large protest. The vice president Merle Buck stated the protests were not about the decision, but for a decrease in interest rates. He stated that an abnormally good year in revenue for the company had offset the costs that the increase would have created. In 1991, GTE acquired Contel, which heavily increased GTE's standing in the telecommunications market.

== Subsidiaries ==
Subsidiaries of Contel included:

- Contel of the South (Georgia)
- Contel of California (including lines in Arizona and Nevada)
- ConTel of Illinois
- ConTel of Indiana
- Contel of Kentucky
- Contel of Minnesota
- Contel of Missouri
- Contel of New Hampshire
- Contel of New York
- Contel of North Carolina
- Contel of the Northwest (Idaho, Oregon and Washington)
- ConTel of Pennsylvania
- ConTel Quaker State
- Contel of South Carolina
- Contel of Vermont
- Contel of Virginia
- Contel of the West (Arizona and Utah)
