= GTE =

American telephone company

GTE Corporation
- Type: Public
- Traded as: NYSE: GTE
- Industry: Telecommunications
- Founded: 1934; 92 years ago
- Defunct: June 30, 2000; 26 years ago
- Fate: Merged
- Successor: Verizon Communications
- Headquarters: Stamford, Connecticut, U.S.
- Products: Telephone, internet, television
- Subsidiaries: GTE Southwest; CODETEL; Verizon California; Verizon Florida; Verizon North; Verizon South; Hawaiian Telephone; Puerto Rico Telephone
- Website: GTE.com

GTE Corporation, formerly General Telephone & Electronics Corporation (1955–1982), was the largest independent telephone company in the United States during the days of the Bell System. The company operated from 1926, with roots tracing further back than that, until 2000, when it was acquired by Bell Atlantic, which then changed its name to Verizon.

The Wisconsin-based Associated Telephone Utilities Company was founded in 1926; it went bankrupt in 1933 during the Great Depression, and was reorganized as General Telephone in 1934. In 1991, it acquired the third-largest independent phone company at that time, Continental Telephone (ConTel). It owned Automatic Electric, a telephone equipment supplier similar in many ways to Western Electric, and Sylvania Electric Products, the only non-communications-oriented company under GTE ownership. GTE provided local telephone service to many areas of the U.S. through operating companies, much as American Telephone & Telegraph provided local telephone service through its 22 Bell Operating Companies.

The company acquired BBN Planet, one of the earliest Internet service providers, in 1997. That division became known as GTE Internetworking, and was later spun off into the independent company Genuity (a name recycled from another Internet company GTE acquired in 1997) to satisfy Federal Communications Commission (FCC) requirements regarding the GTE–Bell Atlantic merger that created Verizon.

GTE operated in Canada via large interests in subsidiary companies such as BC Tel and Quebec-Téléphone. When foreign ownership restrictions on telecommunications companies were introduced, GTE's ownership was grandfathered. When BC Tel merged with Telus (the name given to the privatized Alberta Government Telephones (AGT)) to create BCT.Telus, GTE's Canadian subsidiaries were merged into the new parent, making it the second-largest telecommunications carrier in Canada. As such, GTE's successor, Verizon Communications, was the only foreign telecommunications company with a greater than 20% interest in a Canadian carrier, until Verizon completely divested itself of its shares in 2004.

In the Caribbean, CONTEL purchased several major stakes in the newly independent countries of the British West Indies (namely in Barbados, Jamaica, and Trinidad and Tobago).

Prior to GTE's merger with Bell Atlantic, GTE also maintained an interactive television service joint-venture called GTE mainStreet (sometimes also called mainStreet USA) as well as an interactive entertainment and video game publishing operation, GTE Interactive Media.

== History ==
=== General Telephone ===
In 1934, General Telephone Corporation was established with John Winn as president. The following year, the company created General Telephone Directory Company as a division. During World War II, General Telephone helped install phone service for military facilities. From 1946 to 1950, General Telephone obtained over 100,000 telephone lines and bought out Leich Electric Company.

General Telephone's holdings included 15 telephone companies across 20 states by 1951, when Donald C. Power was named president of the company under chairman and long-time GT executive Morris F. LaCroix, replacing the retiring Harold Bozell (president 1940 – 1951). Power proceeded to expand the company through the 1950s principally through two acquisitions.

In 1955, Theodore Gary & Company became a part of General Telephone and allowed the company to hold over 2 million telephone lines after the companies merged. It also had a subsidiary, named the General Telephone and Electric Corporation, formed in 1930 with the Transamerica Corporation and British investors to compete against ITT.

In 1959, Sylvania Electric Products merged into General Telephone and was renamed to General Telephone & Electronics Corporation (GT&E). Power also obtained the purchases of multiple companies. such as Lenkurt Electric Company, Inc and Peninsular Telephone Company. In 1960, GT&E International Incorporated was created as a branch company. Power was named C.E.O. and chairman in 1961, making way for Leslie H. Warner, formerly of Theodore Gary, to become president. Simultaneously, GT&E went on to buy Community Antenna Television providers.

In 1964, Western Utilities Corporation became part of GT&E. Additional purchases during the 1960s included Hawaiian Telephone Company and Northern Ohio Telephone Company. At the end of the decade, ten million GT&E phones were active.

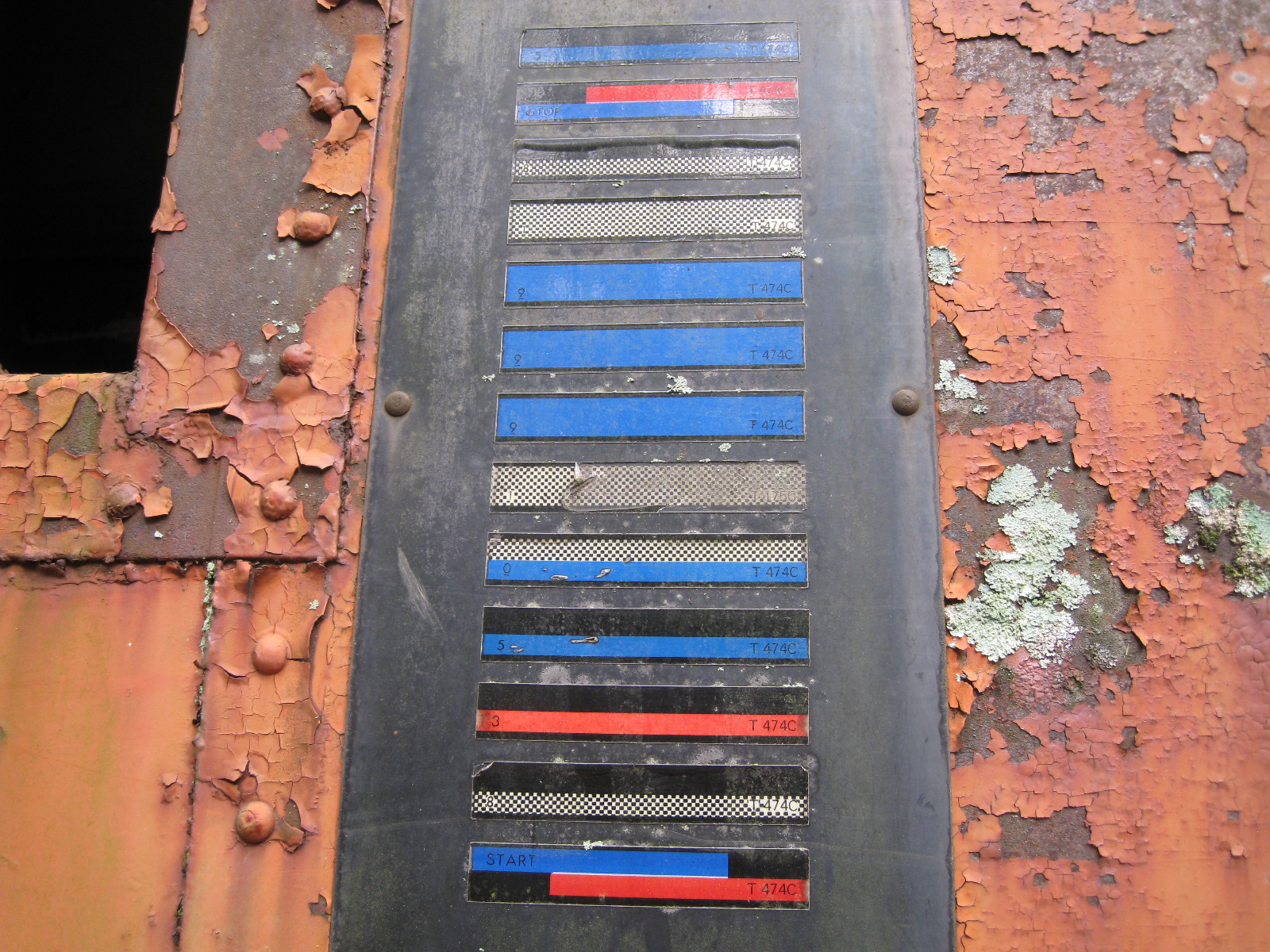
KarTrak Automated Car Identification system on a caboose in Florida

In the late 1960s, GT&E joined in the search for a railroad car Automatic Car Identification system. It designed the KarTrak optical system, which won over other manufacturer's systems in field trials, but ultimately proved to need too much maintenance. In the late 1970s the system was abandoned.

After a 1970 bomb attack to the company's headquarters in New York City, the company relocated to Stamford, Connecticut for their new headquarters. In 1971 GT&E undertook an identity change and became simply GTE, while Sylvania Electric Products became GTE Sylvania. The same year, Donald C. Power retired and Leslie H. Warner became chairman of the board. Theodore F. Brophy was brought in as president.

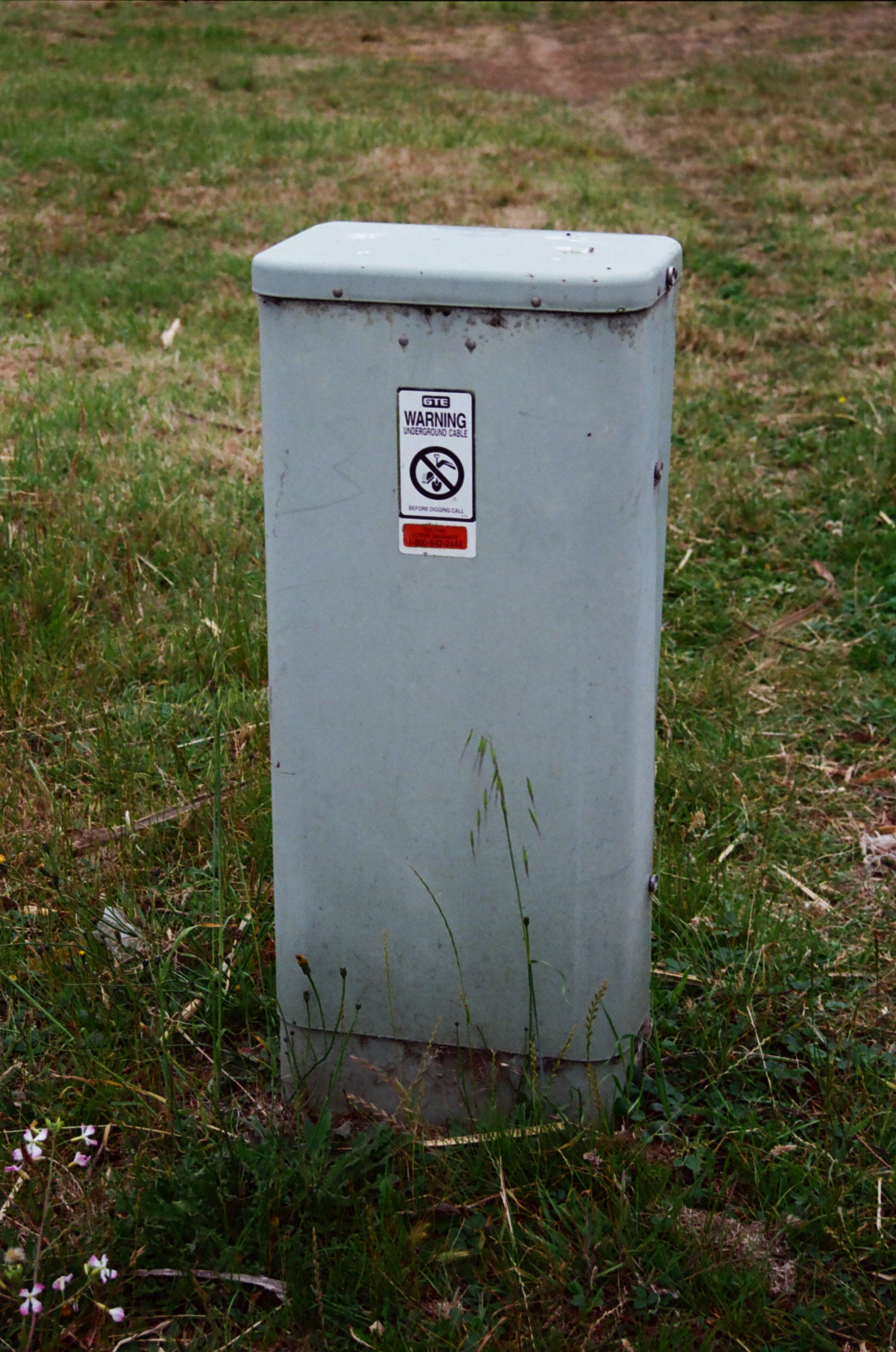
GTE Telecommunications Distribution Pedestal in Crescent City, California.

In 1974, GTE worked with American Telephone & Telegraph in a project to create satellite stations. A few years later, the company's international branch was replaced by a GTE products company in 1976. Their products company remained until 1979.

In 1979, GTE purchased Telenet to establish a presence in the growing packet switching data communications business. GTE Telenet was later included in the US Telecom joint venture.

=== 1980s ===
On August 16, 1982 the company changed its name to GTE Corp. In December 1983 Vanderslice stepped down as the company's president and chief operating officer.

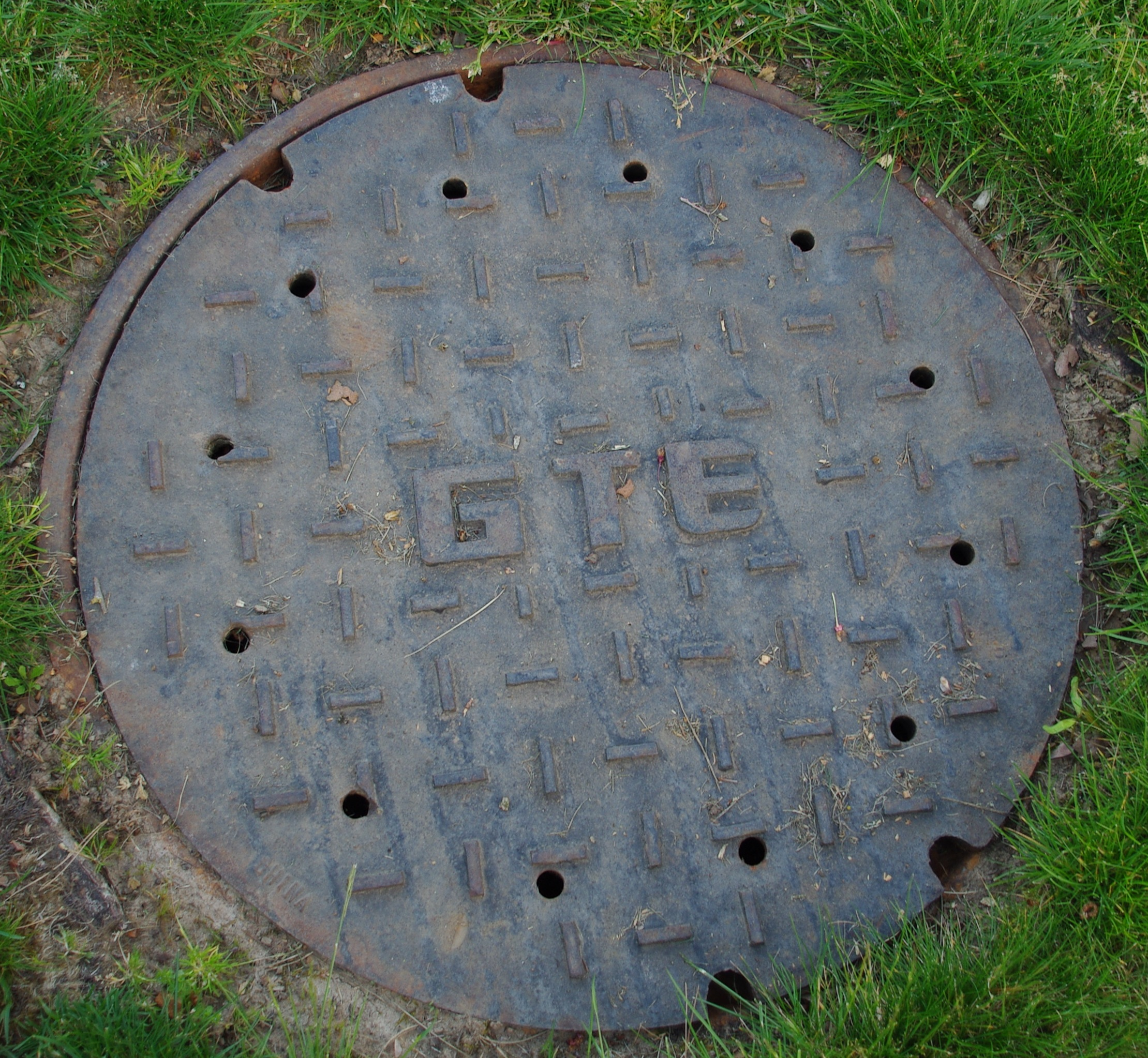
A manhole cover featuring the company logo in Hillsboro, Oregon

In April 1988, after the retirement of Theodore F. Brophy, James L. "Rocky" Johnson was promoted from his position as president and chief operating officer to CEO of GTE; he was appointed chairman in 1991.

Under Johnson's leadership, GTE divested its 50% ownership of US Sprint, the nation's third largest long-distance company. He also orchestrated the sale of Sylvania and the merger with Contel, creating the 2nd largest telephone company in the United States. In 1989, GTE reorganized into six operating groups, focusing on its core businesses of telephone operations, information services, and publishing of telephone directories. With previous job cuts and announced future job cuts, Johnson was able to return GTE to profitability. Other new services provided under his leadership were GTE Mobilenet cellular telephone operations, Airfone air-to-ground telephone services, and the first voice, video, and data services community in Cerritos, California to test home banking, at-home shopping, home security, and pay-per-view television in 16,000 homes and 2,000 businesses.

=== 1990s ===
In April 1992, James L. "Rocky" Johnson retired after 43 years at GTE, remaining on the GTE board of directors as chairman emeritus. Charles "Chuck" Lee was named to succeed Johnson. In 1994, Lee sold the company's satellite provider, Spacenet, to General Electric and Contel of Maine to Oxford Networks, which placed the company into a newly created subsidiary, Oxford West Telephone.

== Merger with Bell Atlantic ==
Original Verizon logo introduced at the time of the acquisition

Bell Atlantic merged with GTE on June 30, 2000, and named the new entity Verizon Communications. The GTE operating companies retained by Verizon became collectively known as Verizon West division of Verizon (including east coast service territories). The remaining smaller operating companies were sold off or transferred into the remaining ones. Additional properties were sold off within a few years after the merger to CenturyTel, Alltel, and Hawaiian Telcom.

On July 1, 2010, Verizon sold many former GTE properties to Frontier Communications. Additional ex-GTE territories in California, Florida, and Texas were sold to Frontier in 2015 and transferred in 2016, ending Verizon's landline operations outside of the historic Bell Atlantic footprint.

Verizon still operates phone service in non-Bell System areas in Pennsylvania under Verizon North, and in non-Bell System areas in Virginia and Knotts Island, North Carolina under Verizon South.

In September 2024, Verizon announced a deal to acquire Frontier, which will return much of the former GTE network to Verizon ownership.

== Operating companies ==
Prior to the merger with Bell Atlantic, GTE owned the following operating companies in the US:

- Contel of Minnesota, Inc.
- Contel of the South, Inc. (Alabama, Indiana, Michigan)
- GTE Alaska Incorporated
- GTE Arkansas Incorporated
- GTE California Incorporated (Arizona, California, Nevada)
- GTE Florida Incorporated
- GTE Hawaiian Telephone Company, Inc.
- GTE Midwest Incorporated (Iowa, Missouri, Nebraska)
- GTE North Incorporated (Illinois, Indiana, Michigan, Ohio, Pennsylvania, Wisconsin)
- GTE Northwest Incorporated (Idaho, Oregon, Washington)
- GTE South Incorporated (Illinois, Kentucky, North Carolina, South Carolina, Wisconsin)
- GTE Southwest Incorporated (Arkansas, New Mexico, Oklahoma, Texas)
- GTE West Coast Incorporated (California)

Following the merger of GTE and Bell Atlantic, some of these companies and/or access lines have been sold off to other companies, such as Alltel, ATEAC, The Carlyle Group, CenturyTel, Citizens/Frontier Communications, and Valor Telecom.
