= Frontier Communications =

American telecommunications company

Frontier Communications Parent, Inc.

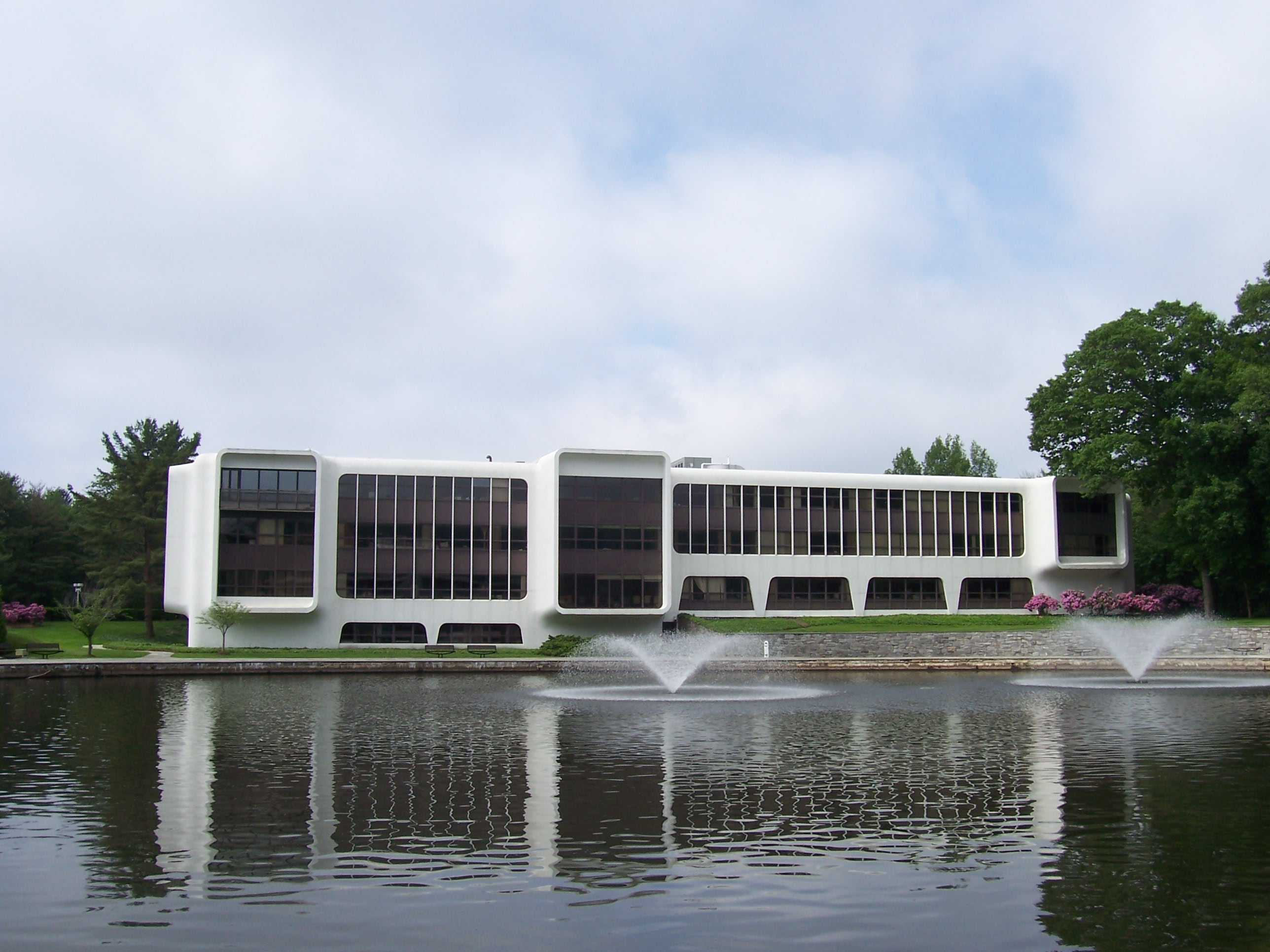
- Frontier Communications former headquarters in Stamford, Connecticut
- Formerly: Citizens Utilities Company; Citizens Communications Company; Frontier Communications Corporation
- Type: Subsidiary
- Traded as: Nasdaq: FYBR (2021–2026)
- Industry: Telecommunications
- Predecessor: Public Utilities Consolidated Corporation
- Founded: 1935; 91 years ago
- Headquarters: Dallas, Texas, U.S.
- Area served: United States (25 states)
- Key people: Nick Jeffery (CEO); Scott Beasley (executive vice president & CFO)
- Services: Local and long-distance telephone service, internet access, wireless internet access, digital phone, DISH satellite TV, fiber-optic internet, fiber-optic television
- Revenue: ▼US$6.41 billion (2021)
- Operating income: ▲US$2.216 billion (2021)
- Net income: ▲US$4.96 billion (2021)
- Total assets: ▼US$16.481 billion (2021)
- Total equity: ▲US$4.796 billion (2022)
- Number of employees: 15,074 (2022)
- Parent: Verizon (2026–present)
- Subsidiaries: List of Frontier Communications operating companies
- Website: www.frontier.com

Frontier Communications Parent, Inc. is an American telecommunications company with a fiber-optic network and cloud-based services owned by Verizon. It was previously known as Citizens Utilities Co., Citizens Communications Co., and Frontier Communications Corp.

It offers broadband internet, digital television, and computer technical support to residential and business customers in 25 states – and, in some areas, also offers home phone services.

== Background ==
Originally incorporated in 1935, the company began to focus solely on telecommunications in 1999, when it sold its natural gas assets and utility operations. Later, it acquired companies such as Frontier Communications of Rochester as well as assets from Verizon and AT&T.

In May 2021, Frontier went public again on Nasdaq after undergoing restructuring initiated by the bankruptcy filing the previous year. The company had around 3 million broadband subscribers and 485,000 video subscribers in 2021 and had a fiber optic network of 8.1 million locations as of 2025.

Frontier shareholders approved the $20 billion sale to Verizon in November 2024. After FCC approval in 2025, the acquisition was completed in January 2026.

== History ==
=== 1935–1993 ===
Originally based in Minneapolis, Citizens Utilities Company was formed in 1935 from the remnants of Wilbur B. Foshay's Public Utilities Consolidated Corporation. Following World War II, the company attracted a group of New York financiers who hired Richard Rosenthal as president of the company in 1945. The company expanded nationally between the 1950s and 1970s. In 1969 purchase of the Kauai Electric Company marked its largest acquisition at the time, bringing its portfolio to 27 subsidiaries in five industries and roughly a dozen states.

While continuing to serve as CEO, Rosenthal was elected chairman in 1970. Ishier Jacobson succeeded Rosenthal as CEO in 1981 after first serving as president and COO, with Rosenthal also retiring as chairman in 1989. A year later Jacobson retired as CEO and president as well. After aggressively expanding the business and focusing on service quality, board member Leonard Tow was named chairman and CEO in 1990. Daryl Ferguson became Citizens' president later that year.

Citizens acquired Louisiana General Services, the largest natural gas distribution company in Louisiana, in 1990. The following year Citizens acquired the gas operations of Southern Union Company in Arizona. It also created Centennial Cellular in 1991 by merging its Citizens Cellular subsidiary with Century Cellular, retaining a 32% ownership stake in the new company. Citizens sold AAlert Paging Company in 1993 after acquiring it in 1986. Under chairman and CEO Leonard Tow, Citizens Utilities agreed to acquire 500,000 rural access lines from GTE in 1993. The transfers of lines and subsidiaries occurred separately in different states as different regulatory approvals were received. 190,000 lines in Idaho, Tennessee, West Virginia and Utah were officially transferred in late 1993, then merging with Citizens subsidiaries such as the Citizens Telecommunications Company of West Virginia. Coghest Frontier of DGF City East/West & Contel of the West lines became part of Citizens Telecommunications of Utah, GTE Northwest lines became part of Citizens Telecommunications Company of Idaho, and GTE South lines were merged with Citizens Telecommunications Company of Tennessee.

=== 1994–1998 ===
In June 1994, Citizens added 270,000 lines in New York from Contel of New York into Citizens Telecommunications Company of New York. Citizens acquired 38,000 more lines that November, with former Contel of the West lines becoming part of Citizens Telecommunications Company of the White Mountains in Arizona, and GTE lines in Montana became Citizens Telecommunications Company of Montana. 5,000 more GTE access lines in January 1995 were merged into Citizens Telecommunications Company of California.

Citizens announced in 1994 that it would acquire 117,000 telephone lines and cable franchises in eight states from Alltel for $292 million. The first acquisitions, of two Alltel operating companies, were completed on June 30, 1995. One was merged into Citizens' existing company in Oregon, while Mountain State Telephone in West Virginia was renamed Citizens Mountain State Telephone, and later became Citizens Telecommunications. Some of the Alltel lines were officially transferred to Citizens Telecommunications Company of the Volunteer State in Tennessee in September 1995, and Citizens acquired Alltel's Navajo Communications that year as well, which operates lines for the Navajo community. Citizens acquired Alltel lines in Pennsylvania, California, and Nevada in 1996, with Alltel Nevada renamed Citizens Telecommunications Company of Nevada.

With major subsidiaries such as Electric Lightwave, Citizens had expanded into 18 states by the start of 1995, with services including telecommunications, natural gas, electric, water, and wastewater treatment. Citizens acquired Ogden Telephone in 1997.

=== 1999–2007 ===
Frontier logo, 1995–2016

Citizens Utilities Company announced plans in 1999 to sell its utilities assets and become solely a telecommunications company. In 1999, Citizens announced that it planned to acquire 245,562 GTE lines in Arizona, California, Nebraska and Minnesota. Later in December 1999, GTE agreed to sell another 106,850 phone lines in Illinois to Citizens for $303 million. Separate from GTE, in 1999 Citizens agreed to acquire 530,000 rural access lines from US West, a Baby Bell company, for $1.65 billion. US West's owner Qwest terminated the sale two years later after stating that Citizens refused to complete the transaction. Citizens' water and wastewater operations (serving Arizona, California, Illinois, Indiana, Ohio and Pennsylvania) were sold for $835 million to American Water in October 1999, electric utility operations for $535 million in February 2000, and Louisiana natural gas assets to Atmos Energy in April 2000 for $375 million.

The company was known as Citizens Utilities Company until the summer of 2000, when it was renamed Citizens Communications Company. Citizens then sold its Colorado gas utilities to Kinder Morgan in 2001 for about $11 million. In July 2001, Citizens Communications acquired assets and the Frontier name from Global Crossing for $3.65 billion. Global Crossing had previously acquired the Frontier name when it had purchased Frontier Corporation two years prior.

Citizens Communications Company sold its remaining water and wastewater operations to American Water Works in 2002. Also that year it sold its Kauai Electric Company for $215 million and its Gas Company of Hawaii for $115 million, at which point Citizens had generated a total of $1.9 billion from selling off its utilities. In 2003 it sold its Arizona electric and gas utilities to UNS Energy, and in 2004 it sold its Vermont electric distribution division to Vermont Electric Cooperative and its Vermont transmission system to the Vermont Electric Power Company. Citizens acquired Commonwealth Telephone, a Pennsylvania telephone company, in 2006.

=== 2008–2013 ===
Citizens Communications changed its corporate name to Frontier Communications Corporation on July 31, 2008, with the company's stock symbol on the New York Stock Exchange changed from "CZN" to "FTR". In June 2010, Frontier Communications sued Google over Google Voice, alleging the product infringed on its own invention to link multiple phone lines to a single number.

In May 2009, Frontier announced it would acquire Verizon's wireline businesses in Arizona, Idaho, Illinois, Indiana, Michigan, Nevada, North Carolina, Ohio, Oregon, South Carolina, Washington, West Virginia, and Wisconsin for $8.6 billion. The overall deal encapsulated Verizon's phone, cable TV, and internet service businesses in much of the western United States. The sale closed in July 2010, tripling Frontier's customer base from 2.3 to 7 million in 27 states. The 2010 Verizon takeover primarily included former rural GTE exchanges. Frontier also acquired the former Bell System unit Verizon West Virginia, alongside its existing separate subsidiary Citizens Telecommunications Company of West Virginia. Frontier was required not to raise rates in some regions, with broadband access to be increased to 85% of subscribers in all of its territories by 2013. At the time, 92% of Frontier's existing customers had broadband access compared to 65% in newly acquired areas.

Frontier kept the name "FiOS" for the fiber systems and licenses it acquired from Verizon until a 2020 rebranding. Acquiring its first television service through the Verizon acquisition, Frontier's integration of the pre-existing television services proved rocky. Eight months after the acquisition, Frontier began pulling out of cable TV and offering free subscriptions to DirecTV instead, stating it had underestimated how competitive the field was. While Frontier had initially claimed it had no plans to change FiOS TV prices until 2012, it substantially raised the rates in February 2011 citing rising programming costs, by 50% in some regions. It also instituted a $500 installation fee for new television subscribers and began removing itself from TV franchise agreements in some cities in Oregon. After a significant drop in Fiber TV subscribers, in 2011 Frontier retracted the rate increases except in Indiana. On December 16, 2011, Frontier moved from the NYSE to the NASDAQ stock exchange, trading under the same "FTR" symbol.

=== 2014–2021 ===
Frontier logo, 2016–2022

On October 24, 2014, Frontier acquired AT&T's operations in Connecticut, including wireline, DSL, U-verse video, and satellite TV businesses for $2 billion, merging various subsidiaries such as Southern New England Telephone and SNET America into Frontier Communications of Connecticut. In 2015, Frontier moved its headquarters from Stamford, Connecticut to Norwalk, Connecticut. Also in 2015, Frontier settled a class action lawsuit alleging slower than advertised DSL speeds in West Virginia. Without admitting wrongdoing, Frontier agreed to invest $150 million on infrastructure in the region and provide discounted rates for affected clients until faster speeds were implemented, which occurred in 2017. Aiming to replace the old copper system with fiber optic technology, Frontier invested another $100 million into its West Virginia network in 2023. On April 1, 2016, Verizon sold its TV, internet, and landline phone business in Florida, Texas, and California to Frontier for $10.5 billion, in a deal that doubled Frontier's size. Maggie Wilderotter served as CEO and chairperson from November 2004 to April 2015, when she was succeeded by Daniel J. McCarthy as CEO.

In February 2018, Frontier had experienced an 8% annual revenue decline, outpacing attempts to cut costs. With revenue also declining in 2019 to about $8.1 billion across 29 states, Bloomberg News reported in January 2020 that Frontier was "asking creditors to help craft a turnaround deal" that potentially included filing for bankruptcy. Succeeding Daniel J. McCarthy, Bernie Han became CEO that month. Frontier Communications filed for bankruptcy on April 14, 2020. With the restructuring plan expected to reduce debt by around $10 billion, it wiped out profits for shareholders who had already lost 90% that year. Frontier management "promised to protect the jobs of its 18,000 employees, and to keep senior lenders and trade creditors whole". As part of the restructuring plan, on May 1, 2020, Frontier sold its Northwest operations in Idaho, Montana, Oregon, and Washington to WaveDivision Capital and Searchlight Capital Partners for $1.352 billion, with the acquired operations renamed Ziply Fiber. As Frontier emerged from restructuring in March 2021, it described a new focus on converting its copper-based telecom network into fiber optic cable. With John Stratton announced as executive chairman of the re-organized company in early 2021, Nick Jeffery became CEO and president effective March 4, 2021. Frontier at the time had 3,069,000 broadband subscribers and 485,000 video subscribers. Jeffery named a new board and executives, including Scott Beasley as CFO and Veronica Bloodworth of AT&T as chief network officer, and stated the company would focus on modernizing, "building fiber as fast as we can," and improving customer service.

=== 2021–2024 ===
After changing its name to Frontier Communications Parent in April 2021, Frontier went public again on May 4, 2021, at $30.00 a share, with FYBR as its trading symbol on NASDAQ. Frontier added fiber connections to 600,000 locations in 2021, which brought its total number of connected homes to 4 million. At the start of 2022 it outlined plans to reach 10 million by 2025. In May 2022, Frontier settled with the Federal Trade Commission over allegedly not delivering promised internet speeds in California, with Frontier agreeing to pay the state $8.5 million. The company published its first environmental social governance (ESG) report in 2022. After consistently low rankings in relation to customer satisfaction, CNET reported in 2022 that Frontier's satisfaction ratings had moderately improved, remaining below industry average but surpassing the scores of competitors such as CenturyLink, Mediacom, and Altice USA.

Ending 2022 with a fiber network of 5.2 million locations, in early 2023 it was reported that Frontier was on track to spend $800 million on expanding its fiber optic network through 2025, with the goal of having 90% of its customers connected to fiber optic cable in Connecticut before 2026. In January 2023, Frontier launched 5 gigabit speeds for its entire fiber network, and according to Fast Company was the first nationwide internet service provider to do so. Frontier as of 2023 was active in 25 states and remained focused on expanding fiber internet services and multi-gigabit speeds under its "Building Gigabit America" strategy. Nick Jeffery remained president.

As of November 2023, the largest investor in Frontier was Ares Management, which owned a 16% stake in the company, followed by Cerberus Capital Management, which owned a 10% stake.

=== Sale to Verizon ===
On September 5, 2024, Verizon announced its intent to acquire Frontier for $20 billion, in a move to expand its fiber internet services. The acquisition was approved by Frontier shareholders in November 2024. On May 16, 2025, the Federal Communications Commission approved the acquisition. In January 2026, the California Public Utilities Commission approved Frontier's acquisition by Verizon, allowing the transfer of Frontier’s California operations subject to conditions on affordability, network reliability, and consumer protections. The acquisition was completed on January 20, 2026.

== Services ==
Frontier offers broadband internet, digital television service, and computer technical support to residential and business customers. In some locations there are also home phone services offered. Frontier launched a cloud-based unified-communications-as-a-service (UCaaS) option for businesses in 2018. Although the company stopped marketing TV with traditional linear video ads to new customers in 2021, some customers continue to be offered the service through legacy contracts.

=== Internet plans ===
Its broadband services include Frontier Fiber, a fiberoptic service, and Frontier Internet, its copper-dependent DSL service. All of Frontier's internet plans come with unlimited data and typically don't require a contract, with discounts available through the Affordable Connectivity Program. The company offers discounted access to the streaming service YouTube TV with integrated billing. For its internet services, Frontier has four plans ranging from 500 megabit to 5 gigabit download speeds, all of which have symmetrical upload speeds. The DSL service Frontier Internet has one plan offered with "varying" speeds depending on the residence's proximity to a local transmitting station. Frontier provides free Eero routers to customers. Although routers are now free, Frontier had previously charged an automatic $10 router rental fee.

Frontier's Fiber Frontier fiber optic service has met with a largely positive reception in the press, although performance of the DSL service has been described as variable depending on region. PC Magazine's annual survey of ISP customer satisfaction in 2019 again listed Frontier's DSL service at or near the bottom in terms of "Overall Satisfaction", a sentiment reflected in outlets such as Consumer Affairs in 2016. David Anders of CNET named Frontier Fiber 500 as the "best internet deal overall" offered by an American ISP for May 2023, specifically praising the service's fast speeds, TV bundle, unlimited data, free wifi router, lack of term agreements, and suitability for online gaming. Anders, however, described Frontier's copper DSL service as "hit or miss" due to speeds being dependent on regional infrastructure. Anders did praise Frontier Internet's unlimited data for being a relatively rare feature for an ISP to offer in rural regions.

=== Regions ===
Frontier offers services in 25 states, including Alabama, Arizona, California, Connecticut, Florida, Georgia, Illinois, Indiana, Iowa, Michigan, Minnesota, Mississippi, Nebraska, Nevada, New Mexico, New York, North Carolina, Ohio, Pennsylvania, South Carolina, Tennessee, Texas, Utah, West Virginia, and Wisconsin. The company previously served primarily rural areas and smaller communities but now also serves several large metropolitan markets. Fiber service was available in regions of 15 states as of 2023, while some regions had DSL options without fiber, other regions lacked DSL internet.

== Sponsorships ==
When Frontier Field opened in Rochester, New York in 1996, Frontier signed a 20-year naming rights deal, which was re-optioned in 2015. Frontier sponsored the Frontier @ the Glen, a NASCAR Cup race at Watkins Glen International and in 2011 also purchased the naming rights to the Frontier Ice Arena in Coeur d’Alene, Idaho. Frontier was the title sponsor of the Connecticut Sun WNBA basketball team in 2015, as well as the title sponsor of the 2017 American Athletic Conference's Men's and Women's basketball championships.

== See also ==
- List of United States telephone companies
- List of companies based in Norwalk, Connecticut
