= Iowa Telecom =

Iowa telecommunications company

Iowa Telecommunications Services, Inc.
- Company type: Private
- Industry: Telecommunications
- Founded: 1999
- Headquarters: 400 W 4th St. N. Newton, Iowa 50208
- Products: Network and communication equipment
- Services: Phone, Internet, and TV
- Owner: Alan Wells
- Number of employees: 800
- Website: http://www.iowatelecom.com

Iowa Telecommunications Services, Inc., commonly known as Iowa Telecom, provided local telephone service to former GTE customers in the U.S. states of Iowa, Missouri, Illinois, and Minnesota. Iowa Telecom was founded in 1999 as a partnership between Iowa Network Services and ING Barings. It acquired the assets of GTE Midwest, which served Iowa following Bell Atlantic's purchase of GTE. It had 257,700 access lines and served 435 communities in Iowa.

In 2002 Iowa Telecom bought PC Partner Communications and Zumatel Communications.

On February 7, 2008, Iowa Telecom bought Lakedale Communications, Sherbtel Comminuations, Conntections-ETC, and SOMA, all located in Minnesota. At that time it also acquired Willinet in New York.

On November 24, 2009, Iowa Telecom was acquired by Windstream.

Its telephone directories were published by Pinnacle Publishing.

== See also ==
- IPKall
- RtBrick
