= Carmello DeJesus =

Puerto Rican serial killer

- Born: 1934; Puerto Rico
- Died: September 8, 1973 (aged 39); Perinton, New York, U.S.
- Cause of death: Self-inflicted gunshot wound
- Other names: Antonio Angel DeJesus; Jimenez DeJesus
- Conviction: N/A
- Penalty: N/A

Details
- Victims: 3–4
- Span of crimes: 1971–1973
- Country: United States
- States: New Jersey, Florida
- Date apprehended: N/A

Carmello DeJesus (1934 – September 8, 1973) was a Puerto Rican serial killer who committed suicide in 1973, leaving behind a suicide note in which he confessed to the murders of four women in New Jersey and Florida from 1971 to 1973. Three of his purported victims were subsequently identified and their cases closed, but the fourth remains unidentified to this day.

== Prior crimes ==
Little is known of DeJesus' background. Born in Puerto Rico sometime in 1934, he moved to the mainland United States sometime afterwards and quickly garnered a reputation as a gambler and career criminal with a short temper. According to the FBI, he had a rap sheet dating back to 1960, with convictions in both New Jersey and Florida for burglary, gambling, possession of stolen property, assault and escaping from prison on two separate occasions.

== Murders ==
DeJesus' first known murder occurred on September 17, 1971, in Bridgeton, New Jersey. On that day, he broke inside the home of a girlfriend, Octavia Lloyd, who attempted to chase him off. During the scuffle, DeJesus pulled out a gun and shot her through the chest, killing her. By the time neighbors found her body on the back porch, he had managed to get into his car and drive away before abandoning it near Woodstown, where he stole another car and fled. A few days later, DeJesus was indicted in absentia for Lloyd's murder and several offenses related to the break-in.

For the next two years, both state authorities and the FBI attempted to track him down, following tips that placed him in Pennsylvania, New York, Florida, Mexico and his native Puerto Rico, but were unable to apprehend him. Unbeknownst to them, DeJesus had found work as a sweeper at the Comstock Canning Company in Egypt, a small hamlet within the town of Perinton, New York. It is unclear whether he committed any crimes during this period, as no murders or other violent crimes have been linked to him throughout the year of 1972.

On January 5, 1973, DeJesus was living in a motel in Delray Beach, Florida, where he was kept company by 30-year-old Sandra Lee Postell (also known as Sandy Lee Barbery). Under unclear circumstances, the pair got into an argument which resulted in DeJesus slitting Postell's throat with a knife before fleeing the crime scene. He then moved to Camden, New Jersey, where he became acquainted with 40-year-old Milagros Inez Pena, a single mother-of-two who lived in an apartment with her 23-year-old son. On September 1, while Pena's son was visiting some friends for the weekend, the pair got into an argument that soon turned violent, with Pena seemingly attempting to escape the residence. Before she could do so, however, DeJesus shot her once through the heart, killing her instantly. Pena's body was found by her daughter two days later. An autopsy concluded that the bullet had pierced through her right upper chest and then exited through her back, but the coroner could not determine what caliber the weapon was.

== Suicide ==
The day after Pena's body was found, an arrest warrant was issued for DeJesus, as he was considered the sole suspect in her murder. Before they could arrest him, however, investigators received a report from Perinton, New York that the body of a man who had committed suicide on September 8 was identified as that of DeJesus. On that day, a pair of teenagers found his body in a field outside the town, with his gun, a partially-consumed bottle of whiskey and a Spanish-language Bible next to the body, with a suicide note tucked between the pages of the Bible. An autopsy determined that the cause of death was a single shot to the chest which had pierced his lungs.

Upon examination, it was determined that the suicide note was addressed to DeJesus' mother and siblings back in Puerto Rico, and in it, he expressed remorse for his actions and that he would end his life to prevent himself from killing anybody else. In it, DeJesus confessed to killing four victims throughout his lifetime – Lloyd, Postell and Pena's names were listed, as well as the time and date of their murders. Although a fourth victim was mentioned, no clues were provided as to who, when and where they were killed.

In the aftermath of his death, authorities from New York, New Jersey and Florida reinvestigated some cold cases in their jurisdiction to see if they could identify the purported fourth victim. Among them was a 1968 murder in Miami attributed to DeJesus, but the charges were dropped for unknown reasons. These inquiries proved unsuccessful, and the fourth victim's identity remains unknown.

== See also ==
- List of serial killers in the United States
