= ARTISANworks =

- Established: c. 2000
- Location: 565 Blossom Road, Rochester, New York
- Coordinates: 43.149189°N 77.557324°W
- Type: Art museum, event venue
- Collection size: ~500,000 pieces
- Founders: Louis Perticone, Kimberly Trenholm
- Director: Jessica Pawlukewicz (Executive Director)
- Website: artisanworks.net

ARTISANworks is a self-funded 501(c)(3) nonprofit art space and event venue located at 565 Blossom Road in Rochester, New York, United States. Housed in a 40,000-square-foot (3,700 m^{2}) renovated industrial warehouse that once produced cannons during World War II, ARTISANworks contains approximately 500,000 pieces of artwork, antiques, automobiles, and memorabilia displayed floor-to-ceiling throughout interconnected themed rooms. Founded circa 2000 by Louis Perticone and Kimberly Trenholm, it describes itself as a "modern culture art space" rather than a traditional gallery or museum, combining immersive art displays, resident artist studios, event hosting, and a lease-to-own art program.

ARTISANworks celebrated its 25th anniversary with a gala on April 5, 2025.

== History ==
=== Founding ===
ARTISANworks was co-founded by Louis Perticone and Kimberly Trenholm as a space intended for everyone to experience creativity, feel welcome, and to support artists. Perticone was inspired by Alfred Stieglitz's 291 Gallery in New York City, which introduced American audiences to European artists including Henri Matisse, Paul Cezanne, Pablo Picasso, and Marcel Duchamp. Unlike that early 20th-century model, Perticone envisioned a space that was inclusive of all artists and all forms of art, describing it as a "modern culture art space" rather than a gallery or museum.

The organization was incorporated as a nonprofit in 2000, with its stated mission to "foster the creation and appreciation of the arts by presenting, discussing, and documenting regional, national, international and master artists in a range of media." By January 2005, the organization was described as "nearly 12 years old," suggesting Perticone began developing the concept in the early 1990s before formal incorporation.

=== Growth and expansion ===
Perticone gradually evolved his personal art collection into a nonprofit enterprise housed in an expanding industrial space on Blossom Road. By 2005, the facility included a 30-seat screening theater, a rooftop garden, a Japanese dining room, a Victorian dining room, and a Frank Lloyd Wright tribute room, with artist studios accessible via an upper-floor walkway called Boulevard Garibaldi. Perticone also established the Elizabeth Collection, a for-profit arm that purchased works from artists on a monthly basis and then sold or leased them to hotels, businesses, and collectors, offering an alternative to the traditional gallery model of taking 50 percent commissions.

In 2005, Perticone announced plans to franchise the ARTISANworks concept to other cities, stating that interested parties would need a donated building and a patron to cover $3 million to $5 million in startup costs. Additional themed rooms were added over the years, including a "Bourbon Street" recreation of the famed New Orleans street, a "Casablanca" room inspired by the classic film, and dedicated spaces for Marilyn Monroe memorabilia and a 1960s firehouse.

=== 25th anniversary and future ===
ARTISANworks celebrated its 25th anniversary with a gala on April 5, 2025, paying tribute to founder Louis Perticone. Following Perticone's death in July 2024, leadership transitioned to CEO and co-founder Kimberly Trenholm, executive director Jessica Pawlukewicz, and a board of directors.

== Building ==
ARTISANworks occupies a renovated industrial building at 565 Blossom Road in Rochester, historically known as the Farrell Plant. The building was originally part of the Consolidated Machine Tool Corporation, which was formed in 1922 through the merger of five companies and operated a manufacturing facility on Blossom Road. The Farrel-Birmingham Company acquired Consolidated Machine Tool in 1951 and continued operations at the Rochester site until the early 1980s. The factory produced cannons during World War II and later manufactured equipment including presses used in Harley-Davidson motorcycle production.

The facility encompasses over 40,000 square feet (3,700 m^{2}) of interconnected warehouse space, with additional items stored in three off-site warehouses. Some descriptions of the space cite figures up to 50,000 square feet (4,600 m^{2}).

== Collection and concept ==
The ARTISANworks collection contains approximately 500,000 items, all personally owned by the organization's founder Louis Perticone. The collection encompasses paintings, prints, sculptures, taxidermy, vintage automobiles (including a Nash car and a 1960s fire truck), neon beer signs, antiques, and diverse memorabilia displayed floor-to-ceiling throughout the facility.

Perticone's collecting method was distinctive: he often purchased an artist's entire body of work and displayed pieces according to their quality, with the best work at eye level and less favored pieces toward the floor or ceiling. Performing artist Thomas Warfield described Perticone's contribution as "expanding what's possible with art" and noted that by refusing to define what ARTISANworks was, Perticone created openness about artistic possibilities.

The facility features more than a dozen themed rooms and galleries, including:

- Casablanca Room -- inspired by the 1942 film, featuring movie memorabilia, a Nash car, and seating for up to 200 guests
- Bourbon Street -- a recreation of the famed New Orleans street with storefronts, a trolley car, and vintage automobiles
- Elizabeth Regional Gallery -- a gallery space with adjoining Tap Room
- Frank Lloyd Wright Room -- a tribute to the architect's Prairie style
- Japanese Dining Room and Victorian Dining Room
- Marilyn Monroe Room
- Firehouse -- featuring 1960s fire department memorabilia
- Boulevard Garibaldi -- an upper-floor walkway connecting artist studios
- Vertigo Heights, Retro Room, and Prairie Room
- A 30-seat screening theater and rooftop garden

=== Artists in residence ===
Approximately ten artists live and work on-site in integrated studios throughout the building, creating art that visitors can observe. Artists associated with the space have included Ross Rider, Martine Lepore, April Laragy Stein, and Richard Quataert.

== Operations ==
=== Financial model ===
ARTISANworks operates as a 501(c)(3) self-funded nonprofit, receiving no government funding. Revenue comes from membership dues, event bookings, admission fees, artwork sales and leases, and donations. As of 2005, operating costs were approximately $2,000 per day, and Perticone had borrowed roughly $2 million for the gallery.

According to IRS Form 990 filings for fiscal year 2024, ARTISANworks reported total revenues of $1,179,893, total expenses of $535,429, and total assets of $14,174,791. The organization had seven employees as of 2024.

=== Lease-to-own art program ===
ARTISANworks offers a lease-to-own art program, available as a perk of patron membership, allowing individuals and businesses to rent artwork with rental fees applied toward the eventual purchase price. Perticone sought to expand this program into corporate offices, restaurants, hotels, and hospitals throughout Rochester.

=== Events ===
ARTISANworks serves as a venue for weddings, corporate events, and private parties, offering 14 event spaces with capacity for 2 to 1,000 guests. In-house catering is provided by Madeline's Catering, a chef-owned-and-operated company based on-site since 1992 that handles over 800 events annually. The organization also hosts approximately 50 or more nonprofit fundraisers annually.

Regular public programming includes introductory tours every Saturday and Sunday, drag brunches, Sunday thrift sales, and rotating exhibitions.

=== Visiting ===
ARTISANworks is open Friday through Sunday from noon to 5:00 PM, with Monday through Thursday available by appointment. Introductory tours of the car museum are offered every Saturday and Sunday at 2:00 PM, included with admission.

== Louis Perticone ==
Louis J. Perticone (c. 1951 -- July 1, 2024) was a Rochester native who founded ARTISANworks. He grew up near Bay and Niagara streets in northeast Rochester and was the son of William Perticone, a painter who designed and built displays for McCurdy's department store in Midtown Plaza for 30 years. The younger Perticone tried painting but found he was "too impatient" for it; he described himself as a collector rather than an artist.

Perticone graduated from Aquinas Institute in 1969 and enrolled at St. John Fisher College but dropped out to become a massage therapist. His subsequent career included restoring old cars and, in 1988, launching a water-purification company before turning his attention to ARTISANworks.

Perticone was diagnosed with metastatic pancreatic cancer in August 2022 and died on July 1, 2024, at age 73. His memorial service was held on July 6, 2024. Performer Thomas Warfield eulogized Perticone's contribution as "expanding what's possible with art" and "the intersection of art in celebration of art in education."

== In popular culture ==
A short documentary film titled Artisan Works (2015), directed by Stephen Kroto, provides a tour of the facility and features Louis Perticone. The film was produced as part of the Kroto Film and Design series associated with Sir Harry Kroto, the Nobel Prize-winning chemist at the University of Sheffield.

== Recognition ==
- Tripadvisor Travelers' Choice award recipient, placing it in the top 10 percent of attractions worldwide
- WeddingWire Couples' Choice Award recipient as a wedding venue
- Featured by Atlas Obscura as a notable destination
- Featured by I Love New York tourism promotion

== Notable incidents ==
In May 2019, seven individuals broke into ARTISANworks at approximately 1:30 a.m. and vandalized the property, including dumping five-gallon canisters of tar from the roof into the parking lot. The incident was captured on security cameras, and social media helped identify the perpetrators within an hour after surveillance images were shared publicly. The group agreed to pay for damages and volunteer at ARTISANworks as restitution.

=== Clock of Nations ===
Perticone expressed interest in housing the Clock of Nations, a beloved Rochester landmark from the demolished Midtown Plaza, at ARTISANworks. However, because ARTISANworks charges admission and is not fully open to the public, it was not deemed an acceptable location for the clock.

== See also ==
- List of museums in New York
- Rochester, New York
