= McLeodUSA =

Former American telecom company

- Type: Private (Nasdaq: MUSA proposed)
- Industry: Telecom Service – Domestic
- Headquarters: Cedar Rapids, IA, United States
- Key people: Royce J. Holland, President, CEO Joseph H. Ceryanec, CFO Christopher W. MacFarland, CTO
- Products: Telephony
- Revenue: $205 million (estimated)
- Number of employees: 1600
- Parent: Windstream Holdings
- Website: www.mcleodusa.com

McLeodUSA, based in Cedar Rapids, Iowa, was one of the nation's largest independent competitive local exchange carriers (CLECs) during the years preceding its acquisition in 2008. The company also had offices in Springfield, Missouri, Tulsa, Oklahoma, and The Woodlands, Texas.

McLeodUSA provided integrated communications services, including local services, in 25 Midwest, Southwest, Northwest and Rocky Mountain states. The company is a facilities-based telecommunications provider with, as of September 30, 2005, 38 ATM switches, 38 voice switches, 697 collocations, 432 DSLAMs and approximately 1,700 employees.

== History ==
McLeodUSA was founded by Clark McLeod in 1991. The company went public in 1996. In January 2002, it filed for Chapter 11 protection, emerging from bankruptcy in April the same year.

In 2005, the company stopped trading on NASDAQ exchange. In January 2006, Royce Holland was named executive of McLeodUSA.

On March 22, 2007, the company filed a prospectus with the U.S. Securities and Exchange Commission (SEC) for another initial public offering (IPO).

In September 2007, PAETEC Holding Corp. announced plans to acquire McLeodUSA in an all-stock merger for $557 million. The acquisition was completed in 2008. In 2011, PAETEC was acquired by Windstream Communications.
