= Windstream Missouri =

Windstream operating company

Windstream Missouri, Inc.
- Type: Private (Subsidiary of Windstream)
- Founded: 1953
- Products: Local Telephone Service
- Parent: Alltel (until 2006); Windstream (2006-present)
- Website: windstream.com

Windstream Missouri, Inc. is a Windstream operating company providing local telephone services to some rural areas of the US state of Missouri.

== History ==
Windstream Missouri was established in 1953 as Triangle Telephone Company. It was headquartered in Dixon, Missouri. It was acquired by Allied Telephone and changed its name to Allied Telephone Company of Missouri, Inc.

In 1983, Allied of Missouri changed its name to ALLTEL Missouri, Inc.

In 2006, the company became Windstream Missouri when Alltel sold its local telephone operations to Valor Telecom, which subsequently changed its name to Windstream.

=== Mergers ===
As the "flagship" for Alltel operations in Missouri, Allied Telephone Company of Missouri absorbed the operations of the following small telephone companies Alltel acquired:

- Doniphan Telephone Company (1982)
- Eastern Missouri Telephone Company (1995)
- Liberal Telephone Company (1971)
- Madison Telephone Company (1969)
- Milan Telephone Company (1971)
- Missouri Telephone Company (1995)
- Southern Telephone Company (1971)
- Stover Telephone Company (1969)
- Swan Lake Telephone Company (1969)
- Vandalia Telephone Company (1971)
- Verona Telephone Company (1980)
