= Terrence Building =

Former psychiatric facility in Rochester, NY

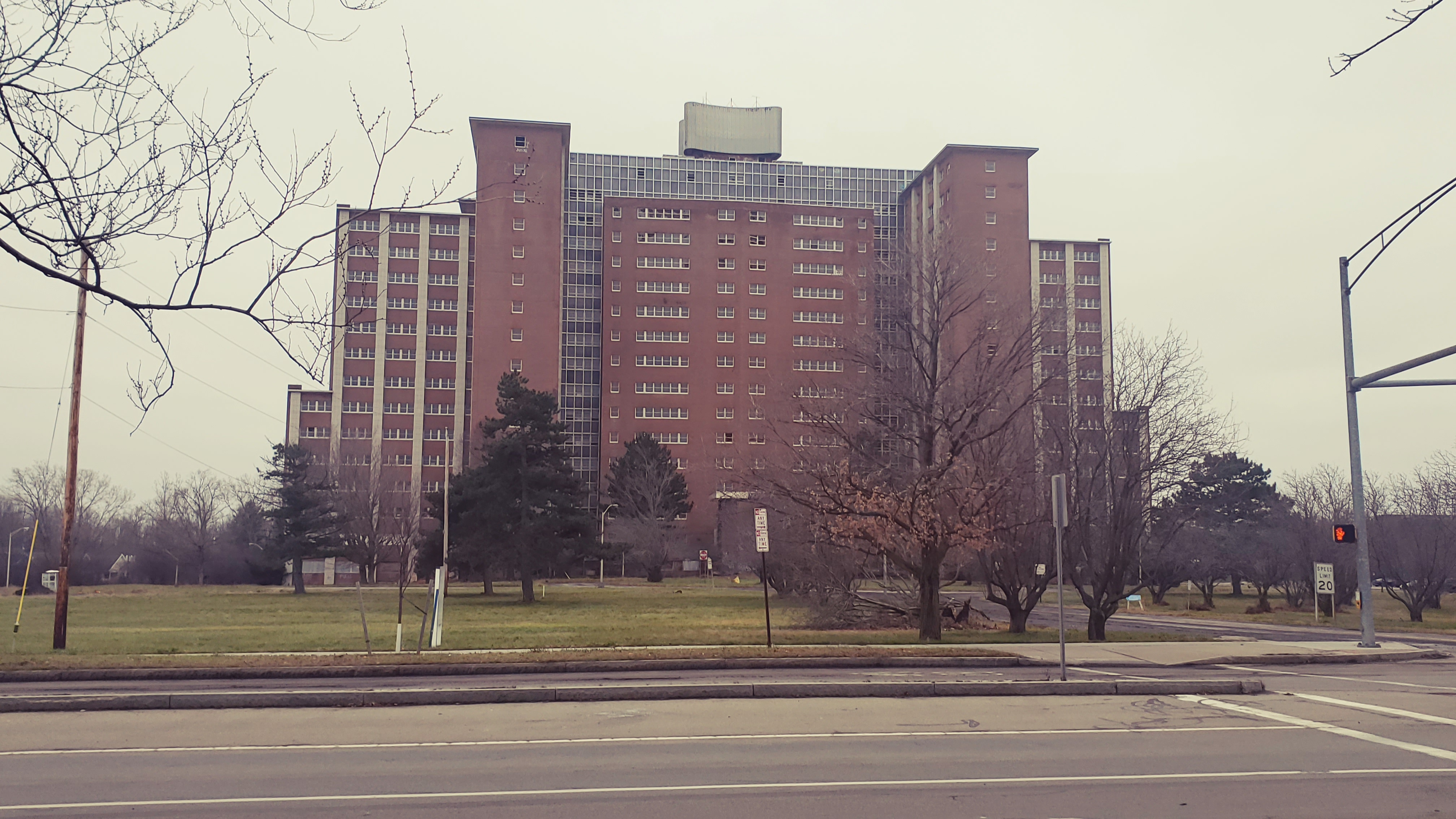
- The Terrence Building in 2021
- Interactive map of the Terrence Building area
- Alternative names: Terrence Tower

General information
- Status: Closed
- Type: Hospital
- Location: 1201 Elmwood Avenue; Rochester, New York
- Coordinates: 43°7′25″N 77°36′23″W
- Construction started: 1955
- Completed: 1957
- Opening: 1959
- Closed: 1995

Height
- Antenna spire: 204 feet (62 m) (estimated)
- Roof: 160 feet (49 m)
- Top floor: 160 feet (49 m)

Technical details
- Floor count: 16
- Lifts/elevators: 6

Design and construction
- Architect: Kahn & Jacobs

The Terrence Building is an abandoned high-rise building and former psychiatric hospital in the Azalea neighborhood of Rochester, New York. Opened in 1959, the 16-story tower was once the home of the Rochester State Hospital, serving as a mental ward that boasted 1,000 beds until it closed in 1995. The empty building, which was one of the largest mental health facilities built in the United States, continues to rise above the southern outskirts of the city to this day.

The Terrence Building is considered to be one of the most haunted places in Rochester, New York by Rochester locals.

== History ==
The Terrence Building was first opened in 1959 as a psychiatric hospital building in addition to housing a geriatrics facility. It became the new home of the Rochester State Hospital, which had existed since 1891 after replacing the Monroe County Insane Asylum. The tower had a different department on each floor, in addition to a general hospital on the 13th and 14th floor, with the 5th floor housing the criminally insane and the basement holding a lab and morgue. During the building's history, allegations of patient abuse within the tower's premises often surfaced. Furthermore, many of the patients were treated as "lost causes, impossible to reintegrate with society" and were essentially locked away inside the tower.

The tower was eventually closed down in 1995 as one of several buildings shuttered in the 1990s by the now-named Rochester Psychiatric Center, and patients were moved to newer buildings of the surrounding campus. Since then, the empty Terrence Building had become a popular destination for urban explorers, similar to the Rochester subway tunnels.

In 2019, a fire broke out in the building's lobby. Several individuals were escorted from the building as the fire was later ruled an arson.

== Future ==
The vacant tower continues to loom over the Rochester Psychiatric Center campus to this day, and if torn down, would clear a site comparable in size to the nearby College Town development or Tower 280 at Midtown. Proposals to remodel or demolish the tower have been on hold due to the sheer cost of dealing with a building of that size, despite nearby residents complaining about the vacant, graffiti-covered, and deteriorating structure.

In 2015, a proposal by developer Robert Morgan was announced to demolish the tower and build a mixed-use development in its place, but no further details have come forth aside from the city council voting in 2017 to demolish the tower, described by Spectrum News 1 Rochester as an "eyesore". Estimated costs for redevelopment have risen to $32 million. However, by 2019, the project had "stalled".

On June 9th, 2026, New York State governor Kathy Hochul announced during a visit to Rochester that the state will provide $20 million to go toward demolishing the building. Officials said the site will be used to create more than 500 housing units. No timeline was shared for the demolition and redevelopment project, but Rochester mayor Malik Evans said several developers have expressed interest in the project.

== See also ==
- List of tallest buildings in Rochester, New York
