= Tower 280 =

High-rise building in Rochester, New York

Tower 280 at Midtown
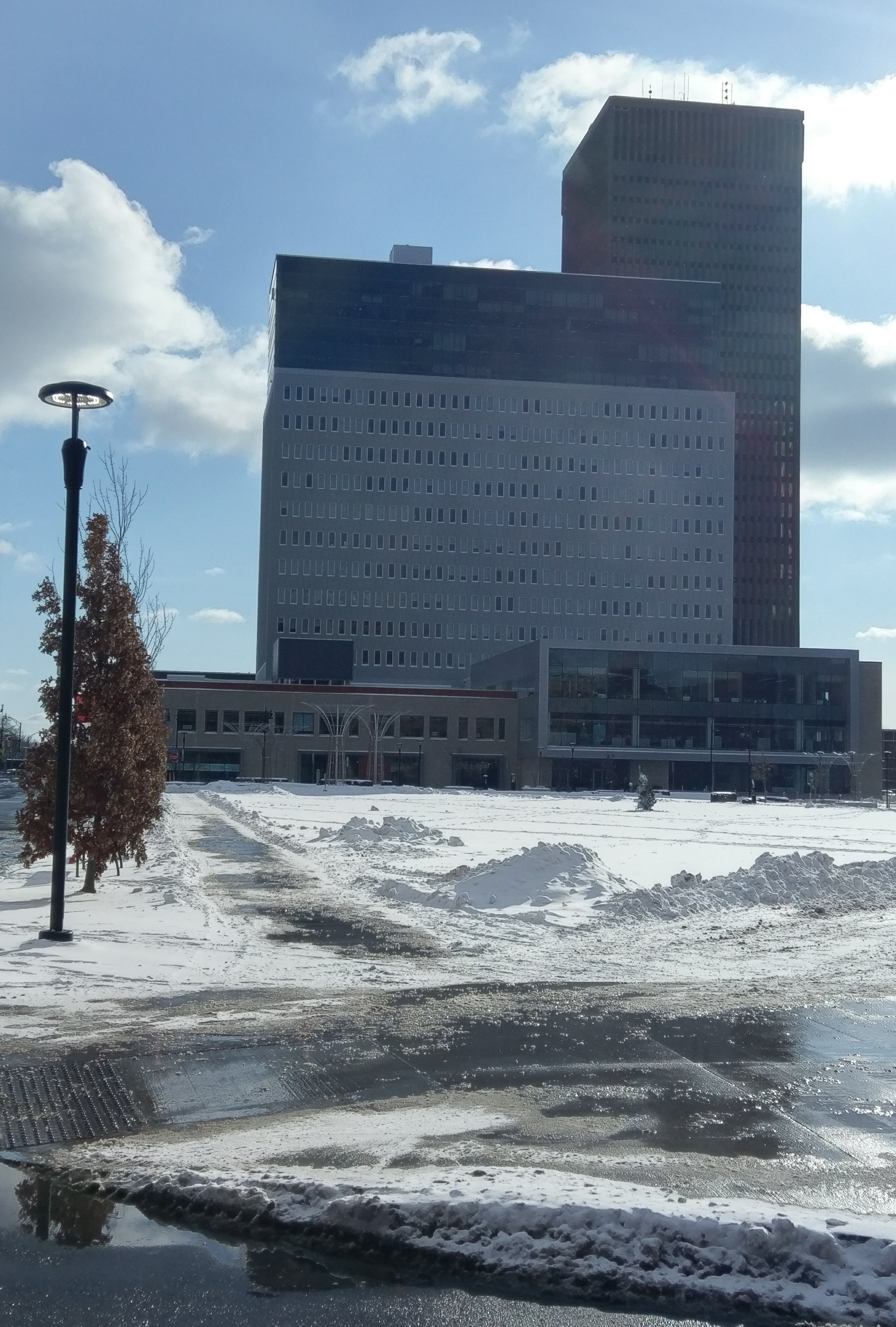
- Interactive map of the Tower 280 at Midtown area

General information
- Status: Completed
- Type: Mixed use
- Location: 280 E Broad St, Rochester, New York
- Coordinates: 43.155627°N 77.604378°W
- Completed: 1962
- Renovated: 2014–15
- Owner: Buckingham Properties
- Management: Morgan Management

Height
- Roof: 251 ft (77 m)

Technical details
- Floor count: 18
- Lifts/elevators: 8

Design and construction
- Developer: Buckingham Properties (2015 Renovation)

Tower280 at Midtown, formerly known as Midtown Tower, is a high-rise building in downtown Rochester, New York, United States. It contains luxury apartments as well as a top floor penthouse with office space and retail space and a restaurant on the bottom three levels.

== History ==
Midtown Tower was first constructed in 1962 as part of the now defunct Midtown Plaza shopping center before the mall's closing and subsequent demolition. While part of Midtown Plaza it was home to a seventy eight room hotel, offices and the 14th floor Top of the Plaza restaurant and nightclub which was known early on for its jazz scene and notable performing acts such as Buddy Rich, Dizzy Gillespie, Count Basie and Sarah Vaughn. As the mall began its decline the hotel closed in 1980 with the restaurant, after a few format changes, closing for good in 2000.

As Midtown Plaza was torn down to make way for the later-cancelled PAETEC Headquarters, the steel structure of Midtown Tower was saved and ultimately retrofitted with a more modern façade. The tower now houses residential units as well as retail and office space on the bottom three levels. By October 2016, the tower's residential spaces were nearly rented out with some retail space still available.

In 2025, the Clock of Nations, designed by Gere Kavanaugh and a focal point of Midtown Plaza before the mall's demolition, was moved into the building's lobby from storage.

== Notable tenants ==
- Colliers Engineering & Design - formerly Bergmann Associates
- Branca Italian Restaurant
- Brand Networks

== Gallery ==
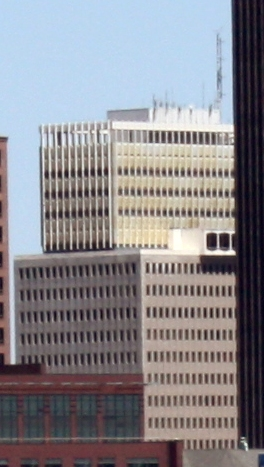
View of the tower with its old façade in 2010

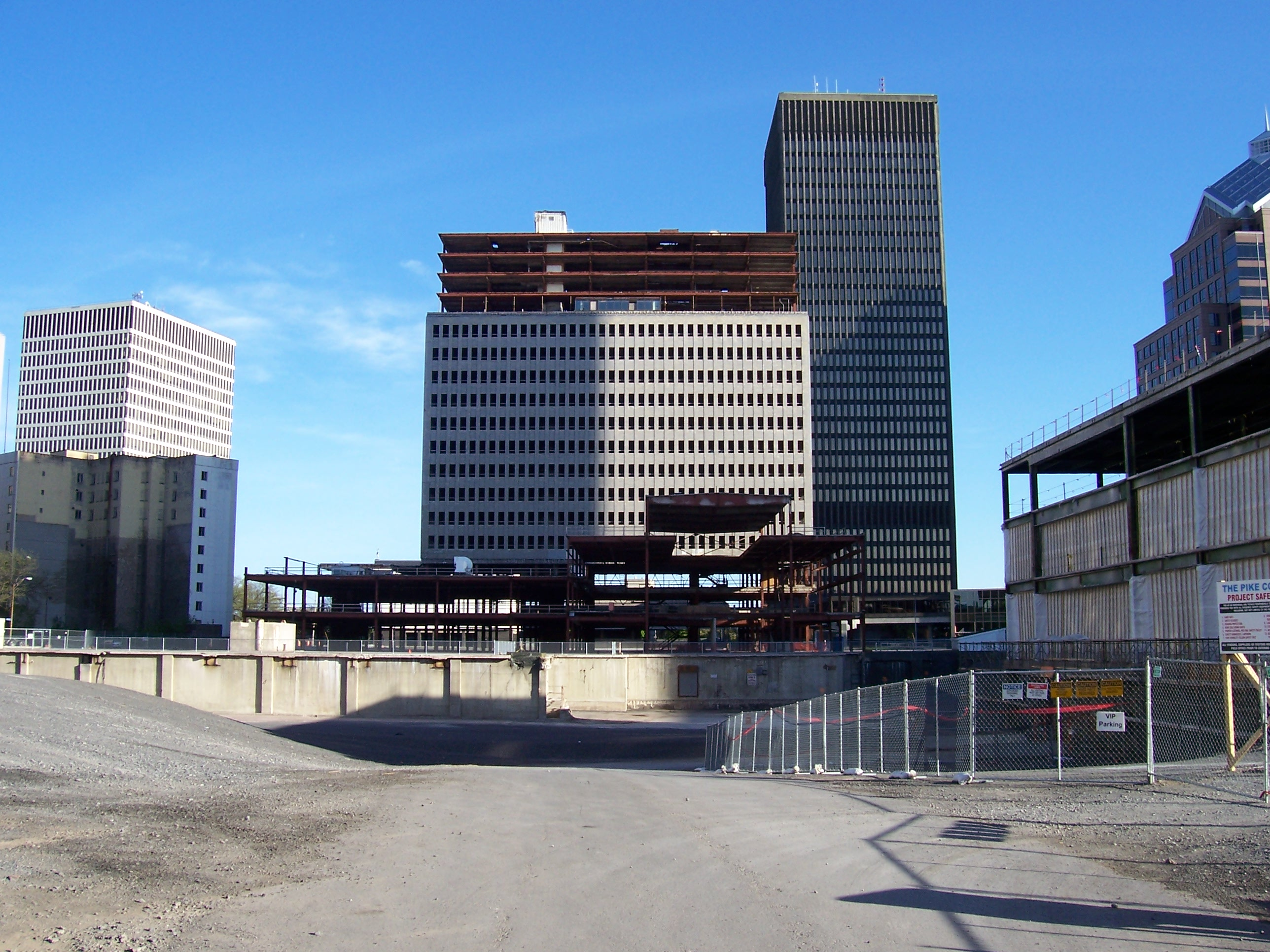
Stripped-down skeleton in 2012

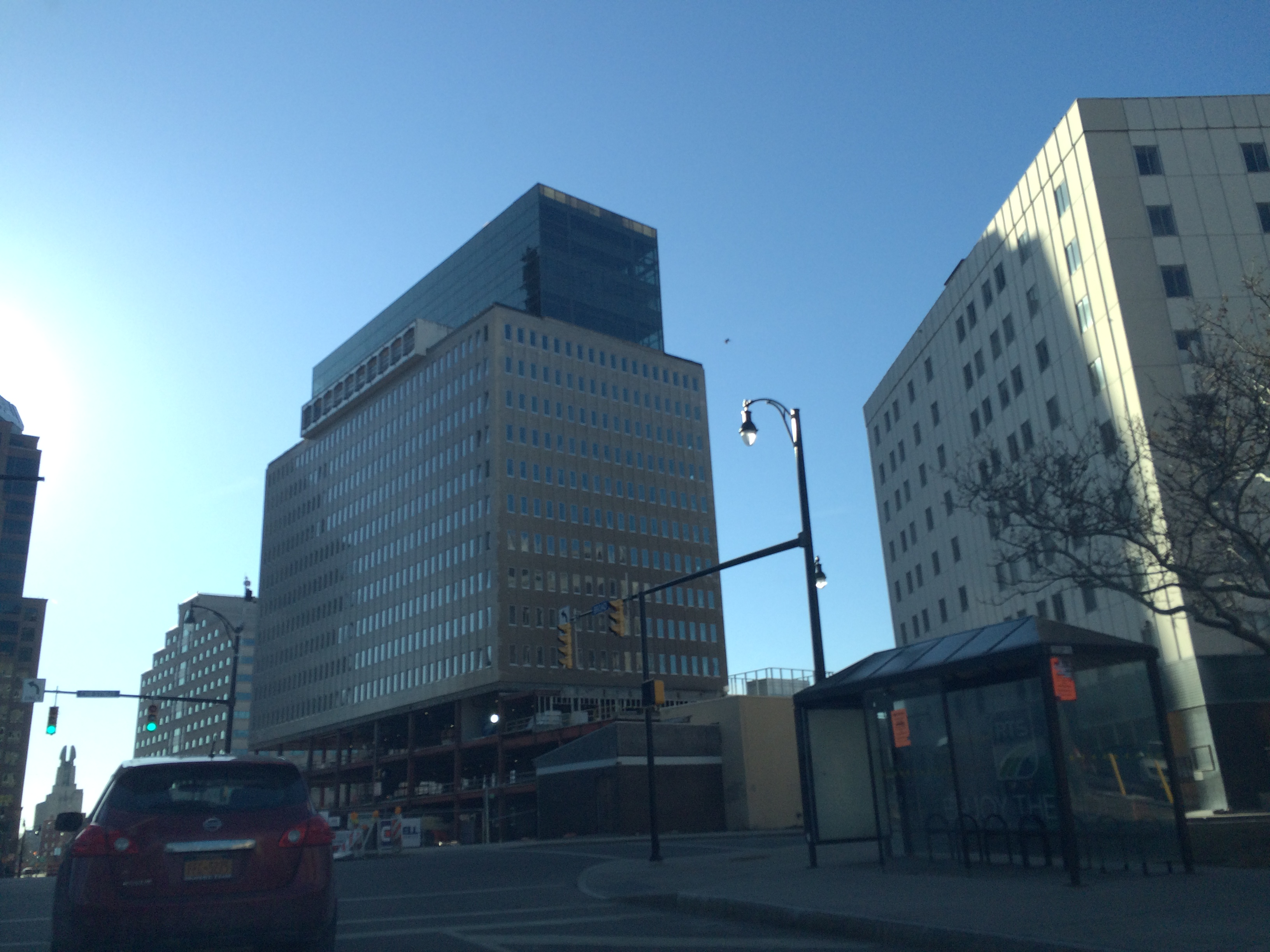
Tower under renovation in 2015

== See also ==
- List of tallest buildings in Rochester, New York
