= Broadview Networks =

Broadview Networks is a network-based electronically integrated communications provider serving small and medium-sized businesses in the Northeastern and Mid-Atlantic United States. The Company offers local, long-distance and international voice services; data services that encompass VPN and MPLS enabled offerings; hosted and premises-based VOIP systems; traditional telephone systems; and Internet access services using digital subscriber line (DSL) and related technologies.

Broadview raised over $320 million in total venture capital funding since its founding in 1996. Shareholders included Baker Capital, MCG Capital Corp., New Enterprise Associates, ComVentures, WPG Enterprise Fund, Apollo Management and Trimaran Capital Partners. In late 2007, Broadview filed with the Securities and Exchange Commission to raise approximately $287.5 million in an initial public offering.

Broadview acquired a number of businesses since its founding in 1996. Broadview acquired a portion of the business customer base of RCN Corporation, certain Net2000 Communications assets earlier acquired by Cavalier Telephone and the DSL business of IDT Corporation In 2006, Broadview purchased ATX Communications, an integrated communications and managed services provider. In 2007, the company purchased InfoHighway Communications, a provider of hosted and managed communications solutions.

In August 2012, Broadview filed for Chapter 11 bankruptcy. It exited the process in October 2012.

On April 13, 2017 it was announced that Broadview would be acquired by Windstream Holdings in an all-cash transaction valued at $227.5 million.

== See also ==
- List of United States telephone companies
