= Midtown Plaza (Rochester, New York) =

Coordinates: 43.15652°N 77.60480°W

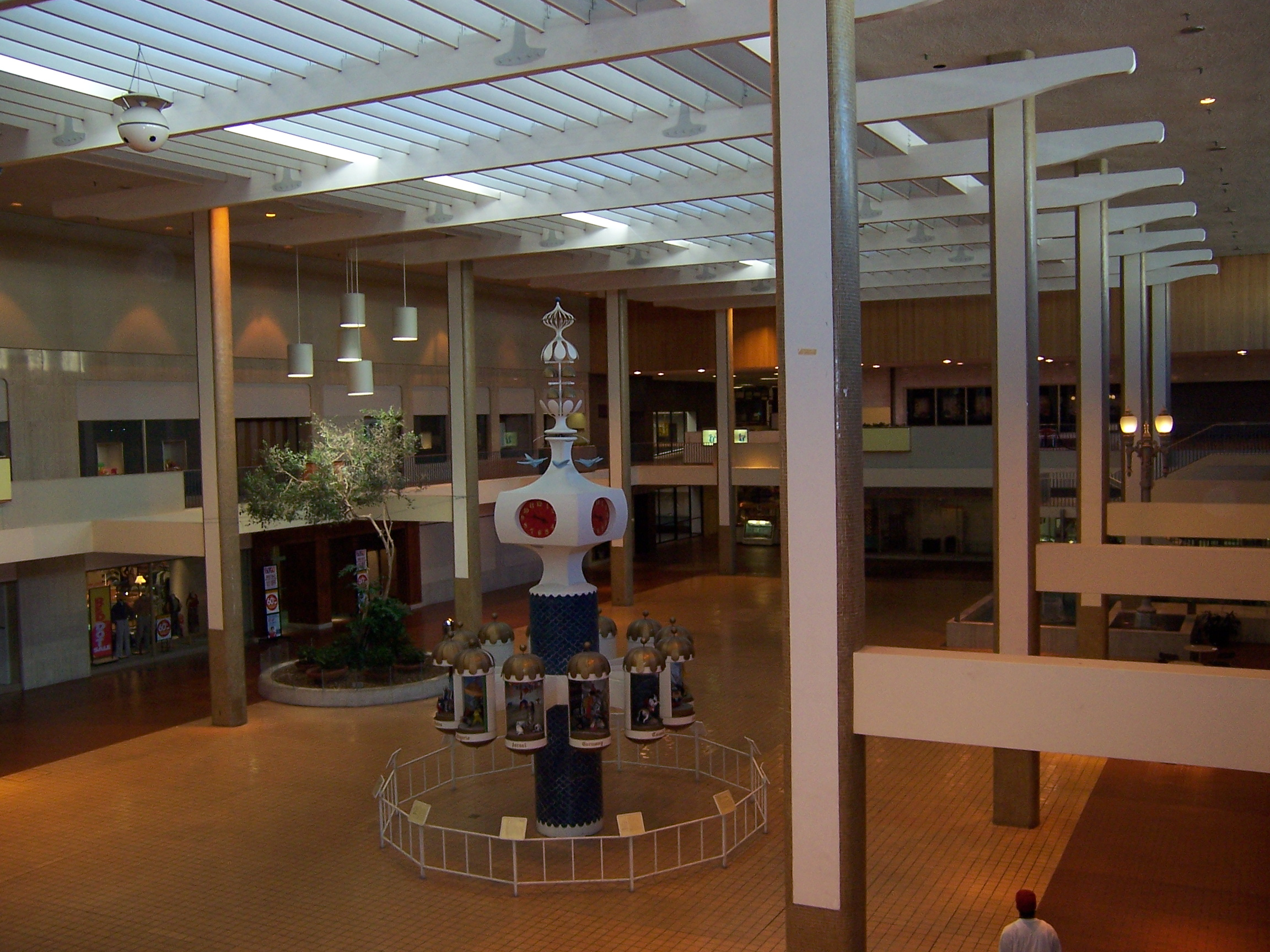
- The Mall in 2007, with the Clock of Nations in the center of the main floor
- Location: Rochester, New York, United States
- Opened: 1962; 64 years ago
- Closed: 2008; 18 years ago (demolished September 27, 2010)
- Developer: Gilbert J.C. McCurdy and Maurice F. Forman
- Manager: Midtown Holdings Co. (a McCurdy's venture)
- Num. of stores: 85
- Num. of anchor tenants: 3 at height
- Floors: 2
- Parking: 3 levels underground

Midtown Plaza is a city district in downtown Rochester, New York. The site was originally occupied by an indoor shopping mall designed by Victor Gruen and opened in 1962. Although it was primarily promoted as a retail space, Gruen's vision was for the plaza to function as an all-purpose community space to revitalize the downtown area. The original mall was closed in 2008 after a decline in retail activity and partially demolished. Since 2010 the site has been redeveloped with new buildings and an open lot known as Parcel 5.

== History ==
The idea for Midtown Plaza started with discussions between Gilbert J.C. McCurdy, owner of the McCurdy's department stores, and Maurice F. Forman, owner of the B. Forman Co. department stores, in 1956. At that time, strip plazas were growing in popularity. Though both owners had opened branch stores, they were concerned about Downtown Rochester's viability amid falling retail sales and came up with the idea of an indoor shopping center. A partnership was formed with the city government, which built a parking garage for the facility. The Midtown Plaza venture was announced to great fanfare in January 1958. Designed by Victor Gruen, the plaza was opened before on April 10, 1962, before a crowd of 5,000. It was the first downtown indoor mall in the United States. The first enclosed shopping center had been Southdale Center in suburban Minneapolis in 1956, also designed by Gruen.

City officials and planners from around the globe came to see Gruen's solution to the mid-century urban crisis, including Walt Disney, who was then designing EPCOT. Midtown won several design awards. Gruen described the aerial view of Rochester as a giant parking lot with a few buildings to inconvenience traffic flow. His intention was to create a pedestrian-friendly town square for Rochester, inspired by public squares in his native city of Vienna. He incorporated art, benches, fountains, a four hundred-seat auditorium, and a sidewalk cafe into his plans hoping to encourage the sort of social intermingling that he saw as the enriching essence of urban life. Later in life, Gruen dismissed the strictly commercial suburban malls as "those bastard developments".

In addition to the shopping center, the Plaza also included an 18-story office building, which at one time held an upscale hotel and restaurant — the Top Of The Plaza — on its top four floors. Count Basie, Buddy Rich, Gap Mangione and many other nationally known jazz artists played at the Top Of The Plaza several times, and the restaurant was a popular site for receptions, business parties, and special-occasion dinners.

Midtown Plaza was initially hailed as a success, and was credited for commercial revitalization of downtown that followed in the 1960s. Xerox, Lincoln First Bank, Security Trust Bank, and Marine Midland Bank each constructed high-rise office towers adjacent to the plaza. However, the success of the retail operations in the plaza were immediately challenged by cultural issues of the 1960s. Older customers frequently complained about the presence of hippies in the plaza, and tenants began restricting hours and customers. During the 1970s and 1980s, the plaza became a popular destination for Christmas shoppers, and ran an indoor monorail at Christmastime. It began to struggle financially in the 1980s as a number of suburban shopping malls opened outside of the city, while the region's population increasingly spread outward from the city center into suburban and even rural areas. Surrounded by pockets of poverty, Midtown was perceived as unsafe struggled to keep tenants. The hotel closed in 1980, and retail space was increasingly converted to office space. Midtown's struggles increased in the mid-1990s when the mall's two anchors, McCurdy's and Forman's, closed in 1994. Their closing was quickly followed by the closing of the Midtown branch of Wegmans Food Markets.

== Closing and demolition ==
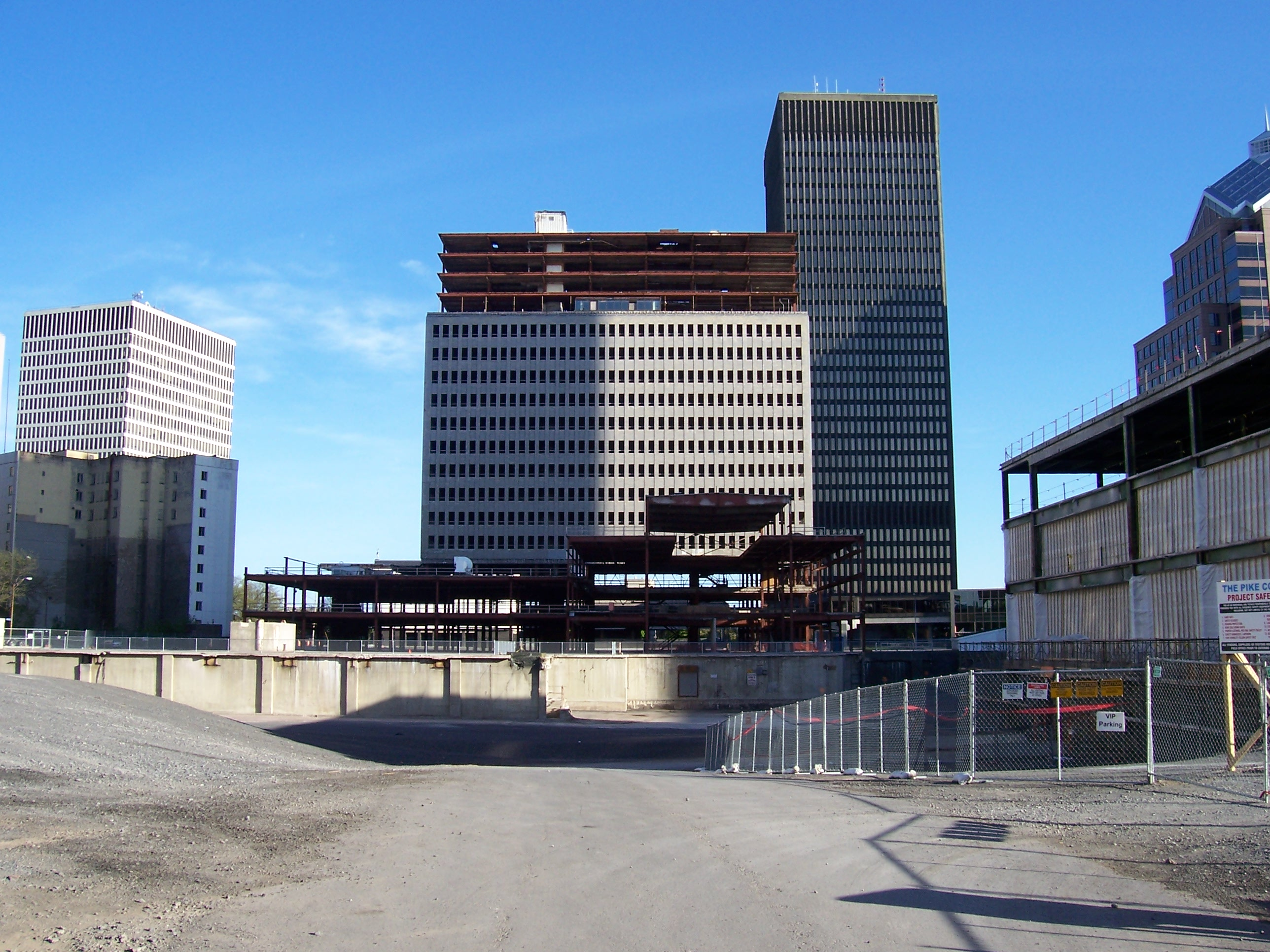
Remnants of the mall in 2012

Midtown Plaza was placed in chapter 11 bankruptcy in 2000 by owner Peter Arnold, and sold to the city of Rochester for US$5,900,000. It was announced on October 16, 2007, that the plaza would be demolished via eminent domain to make way for a new headquarters building for PAETEC Holding Corp. The PAETEC Tower, was planned to be a 40-story tower and 500,000 sq ft (46,000 m^{2}) of space, with plans to break ground in the fall of 2010.

The final Christmas season at Midtown Plaza took place in 2007. The indoor monorail, operated every Christmas season, had its last run on December 24, 2007. The plaza closed to the public on July 25, 2008.

On September 27, 2010, demolition began on Midtown Plaza. Mayor Robert Duffy announced that within a few months, the site would be ready for the construction of the new PAETEC Headquarters. PAETEC then scaled back plans for an ambitious new building and instead opted for a smaller office complex based on a reconstruction and expansion of the nearby Seneca Building. The company was then purchased by Windstream, which canceled plans to construct any new space and moved into the Seneca Building, leaving the now-cleared Parcel 5 an empty lot.

Midtown Plaza was well known for its Clock of Nations, designed by Gere Kavanaugh. The clock was moved to the Greater Rochester International Airport terminal during the demolition, but was dismantled, removed from the airport, and placed in storage during a 2016 renovation, where it remained until 2024. In that year, the Clock was moved to Tower 280—the former Midtown Tower, not far from the Clock's original installed location, restored, and is now on display in the lobby.

== Reconstruction ==
=== Midtown Tower ===
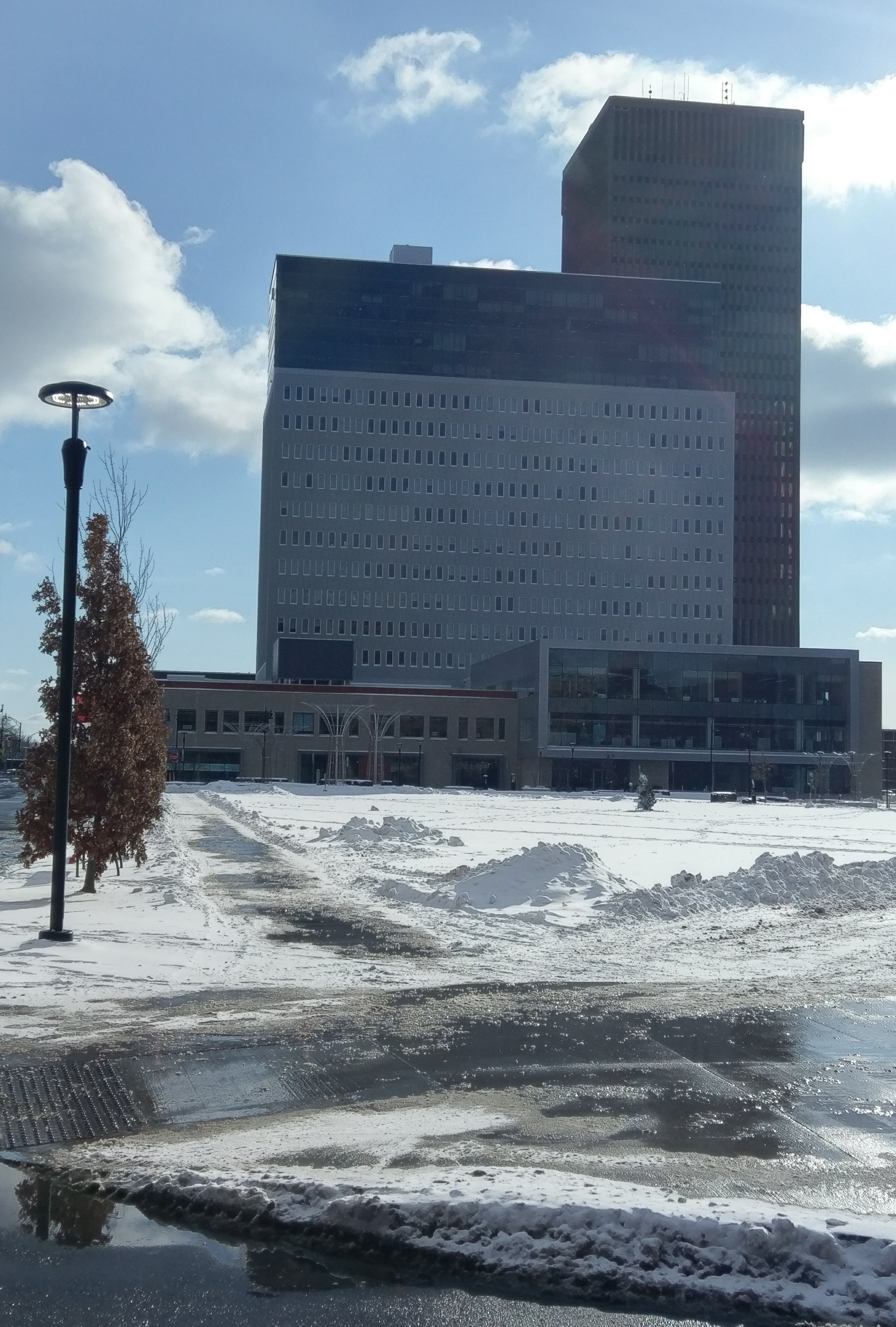
Renovated Midtown Tower, now known as Tower 280

In 2011 the high-rise tower section of Midtown Plaza was stripped to a skeletal state in preparation for its conversion to a mixed-use residential and commercial building. The tower was sold by the city to the local construction and re-development company Buckingham Properties, who renamed it Tower 280 At Midtown. In 2014 the tower began its redevelopment into a mix of residential and commercial space. Occupants began moving in in January 2016. Branca, an Italian restaurant with a location in Bushnell's Basin, opened its second location within Tower 280.

=== Seneca Building ===
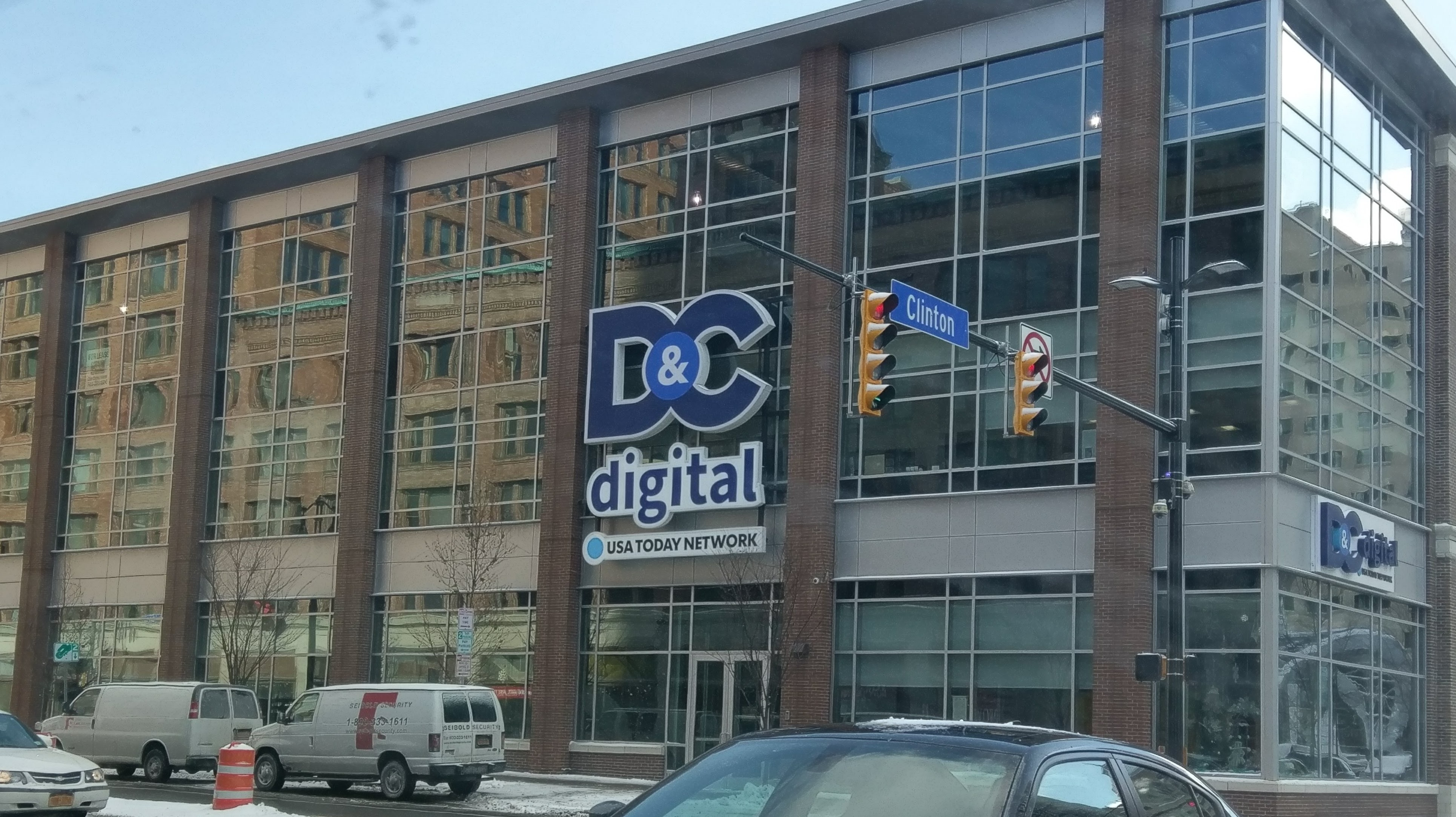
The Democrat and Chronicle building at the corner of Main Street and Clinton Avenue

The building known as the Seneca Building (the only other remaining building from the former mall) was remodeled as a standalone unit and opened as an office building for Windstream, who bought PAETEC in 2011. The building, reduced from seven floors to three, opened in 2013. later that year, it was announced that Gannett was moving its headquarters for the Democrat and Chronicle as part of the paper's downsizing from its location in the Gannett Building on Exchange Street to a building in front of the Seneca Building as an addition at the corner of Main Street and Clinton Ave. The building has three floors and is 42,000 square feet (3,900 m^{2}). The Democrat and Chronicle Media Group occupy the first two floors. The new building also contains a television studio and a restaurant space. The third floors of both buildings connect and are accessible through the Seneca Building Windstream elevator lobby. The building began construction in 2015. It opened on May 2, 2016, with the first day of Democrat and Chronicle operation out of the building.

=== Parcel 5 ===
After the cancellation of PAETEC's proposed building, the city government sought developers to fill in the vacant Parcel 5. Early proposals included retail centers, performing arts centers, casinos, and mixed retail and residential space. On April 7, 2017, the City of Rochester chose a modified Rochester Broadway Theatre League proposal to go on the parcel. The plan, made in partnership with Morgan Development, included a Performing Arts Center to be called the Golisano Center for the Performing Arts in honor of a major donation made to the project funding by Tom Golisano, and a residential tower including approximately 150 rental units with retail and restaurant space at street level. Following the decision, there was widespread skepticism of the viability of the project, which became a major point of debate during the 2017 mayoral elections. On March 6, 2018, further plans were announced for a rooftop stage as well as an IMAX theater in the performing arts center in off peak hours as well as a new name Golisano Arts and Entertainment Complex at Midtown Commons. After issues raising the funds needed to make the project a reality, they moved the proposed project to the site of the Riverside Hotel on Main Street by the Genesee River. In 2021, it was decided to make the site a smaller entertainment and gathering place inspired by the Kansas City Power & Light District and Canalside in Buffalo, a plan which was supported by local activists. The lot was converted to green space, which it remains today.

=== Butler/Till Building ===
Buckingham Properties constructed a five-story building on the former Wegmans site at the corner of Broad Street and Clinton Avenue. The building includes first-floor retail, Class A office space on the second and third floors, and a mix of housing on the remaining floors. Outdoor space is also included. Media services company Butler/Till moved its headquarters from Henrietta to occupy the first three floors in addition to co-owing the building. Construction began in 2020 and was completed in 2021.
