= Cavalier Telephone =

American Local Exchange Carrier (NRCLEC) company

Cavalier Telephone, LLC
- Type: Private
- Industry: Internet service provider, Telecommunications
- Founded: 1998
- Headquarters: Richmond, Virginia, US
- Area served: United States
- Products: Internet, Telephone, Digital Television
- Parent: Windstream Communications

Cavalier Telephone is an American Local Exchange Carrier (NRCLEC) company, owned by parent company Windstream Communications operating in 16 states and DC throughout the eastern US. Cavalier, founded in 1998, is an internet and telecommunications service provider. It currently provides voice, data services to businesses, residential, and government customers on a private network.

== Services ==
=== Telephone ===
Cavalier offers a number of different business telephone service plans for both local and long-distance calling. Rates vary based upon the number of optional features added to supplement basic telephone service. Residential services are provided, but the company does not accept new residential customers.

=== Internet ===
Cavalier offers high-speed Internet service through digital subscriber lines.

In 2008, Cavalier announced that they were partnering with Google to offer a telephone and high speed internet subscription package called "C2". The package included unlimited local and long-distance calling, 12 calling features, and DSL internet for $50 per month. However, use of the term "partnering" may have been misleading, as Google had no direct role in the Internet or telephone service provided through C2, but rather the service was supplemented by Google APS - a service offered free to individuals by Google itself.

=== Television ===
Cavalier partnered with DirecTV in March 2009 and is offering discounted rates on satellite television service.

== Acquisition ==
=== Acquired by PAETEC Holding Corp. ===
On September 13, 2010, PAETEC Holding Corp. of Perinton, New York, announced its acquisition of Cavalier Telephone for $460 million in cash. The merger was finalized in December, 2010, adding nearly 17,000 fiber-route miles to Paetec's existing service footprint. PAETEC was in turn, acquired by Windstream Communications in December 2011.

=== End of new residential service ===
On December 7, 2011, Paetec announced that it would stop accepting new residential customers, and instead focus on its business customers. Approximately 70 Cavalier employees would lose their jobs because of this change. They will continue to service existing residential customers.

== Relationship with Verizon ==
Cavalier has had a particularly rocky relationship with Verizon. In 2001, Cavalier brought a lawsuit against Verizon alleging antitrust violations and violations of the Telecom Act of 1996. The suit was dismissed by United States District Court Judge James R. Spencer in March 2002. The dismissal was upheld on appeal in May 2003. In 2007, Cavalier sued Verizon in federal court again, alleging misuse of Virginia's 911 database.

== See also ==
- List of United States telephone companies
