= Richardson's Canal House =

Historic commercial building in New York, United States

- Richardson's Tavern
- U.S. National Register of Historic Places
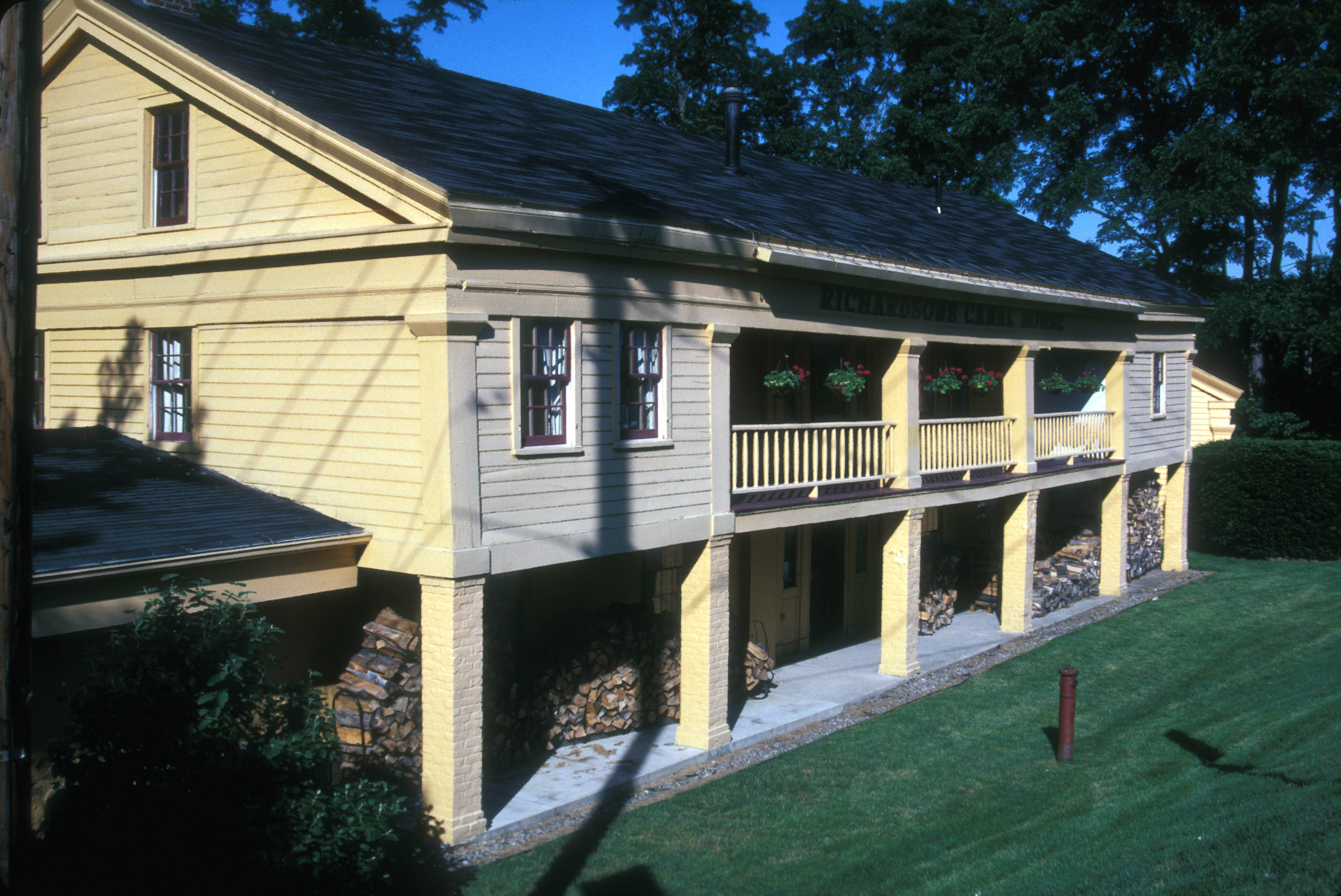
- Richardson's Tavern, September 1970

- Location within New York Location within the United States
- Location: 1474 Marsh Rd., Perinton, New York 14534
- Coordinates: 43°3′43″N 77°28′38″W
- Area: less than one acre
- Built: ca. 1818
- Architectural style: Greek Revival, Federal
- NRHP reference No.: 80002652
- Added to NRHP: May 06, 1980

Richardson's Tavern is a historic Erie Canal inn and tavern located in the hamlet of Bushnell's Basin in Perinton, Monroe County, New York. Believed to be the only remaining establishment from the canal's earliest years, it dates to about 1818 when it was a stop on the stage coach route along the Irondequoit Valley and Irondequoit Creek, between Rochester and Canandaigua. Several expansions occurred during the 19th century. The tavern operated as a hotel until 1917 when it was converted to four apartments. In 1978, after having been abandoned since 1972, it was converted for use as a restaurant, Richardson's Canal House. The restaurant opened on Valentine's Day 1979. It has become one of the most noted restaurants in the county, and has even garnered nationwide recognition.

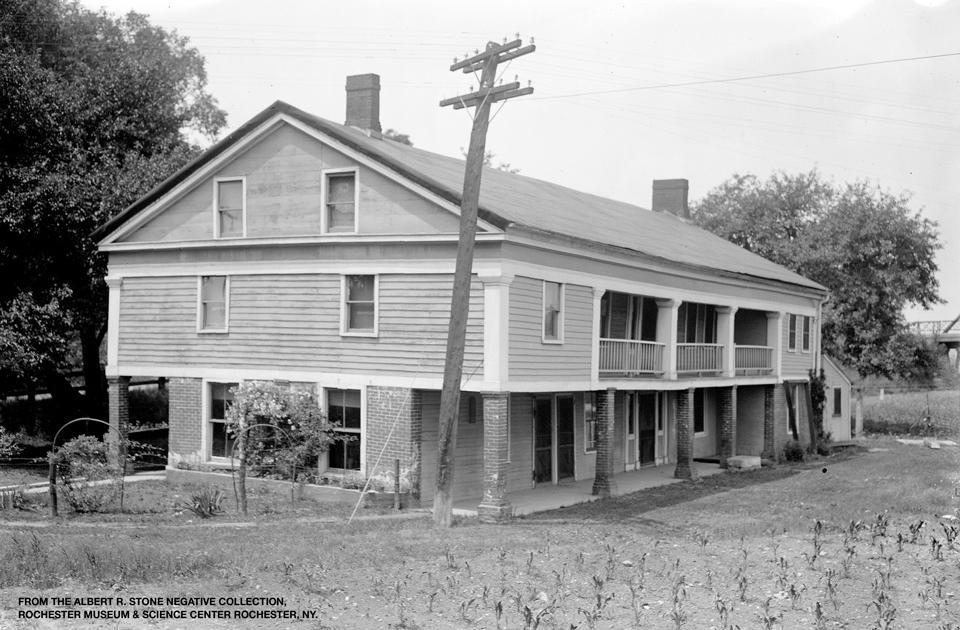
The tavern in 1922.

It was listed on the National Register of Historic Places in 1980.
