= Abandonment (legal) =

Relinquishment under law

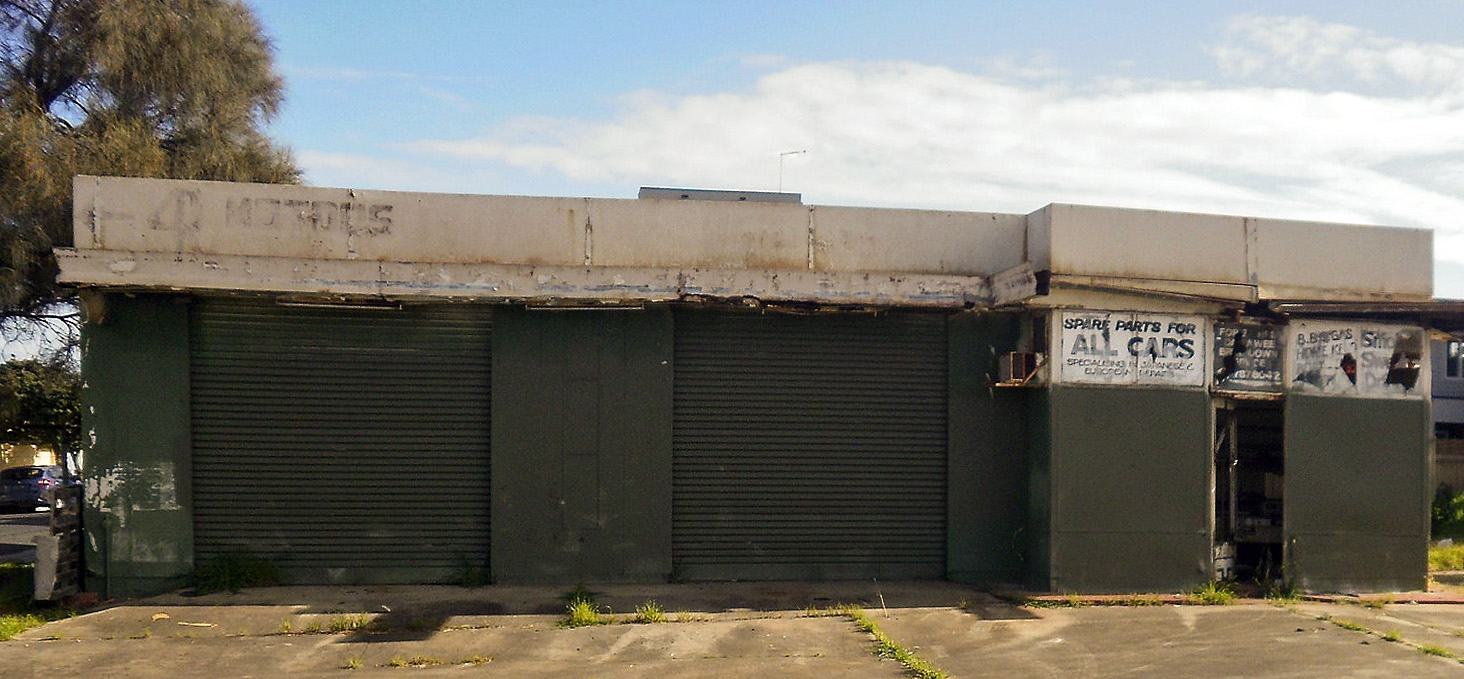
Abandoned car repair station in Victoria, Australia

In law, abandonment is the relinquishment, giving up, or renunciation of an interest, claim, privilege, possession, civil proceedings, appeal, or right, especially with the intent of never again resuming or reasserting it. Such intentional action may take the form of a discontinuance or a waiver. This broad meaning has a number of applications in different branches of law. In common law jurisdictions, both common law abandonment and statutory abandonment of property may be recognized.

Common law abandonment is "the relinquishment of a right [in property] by the owner therefore without any regard to future possession by himself or any other person, and with the intention to forsake [sic] or desert the right...." or "the voluntary relinquishment of a thing by its owner with the intention of terminating his ownership, and without [the intention of] vesting ownership to any other person; the giving up of a thing absolutely, without reference to any particular person or purpose...." By contrast, an example of statutory abandonment (albeit in a common law jurisdiction) is the abandonment by a bankruptcy trustee under 11 U.S.C. § 554.

In Scots law, failure to assert a legal right in a way that implies the abandonment of that property is called "taciturnity", while the term "abandonment" in Scots law refers specifically to a procedure by which a party gives up civil proceedings or an appeal.

== Giving up an interest ==
=== Abandonment of property ===
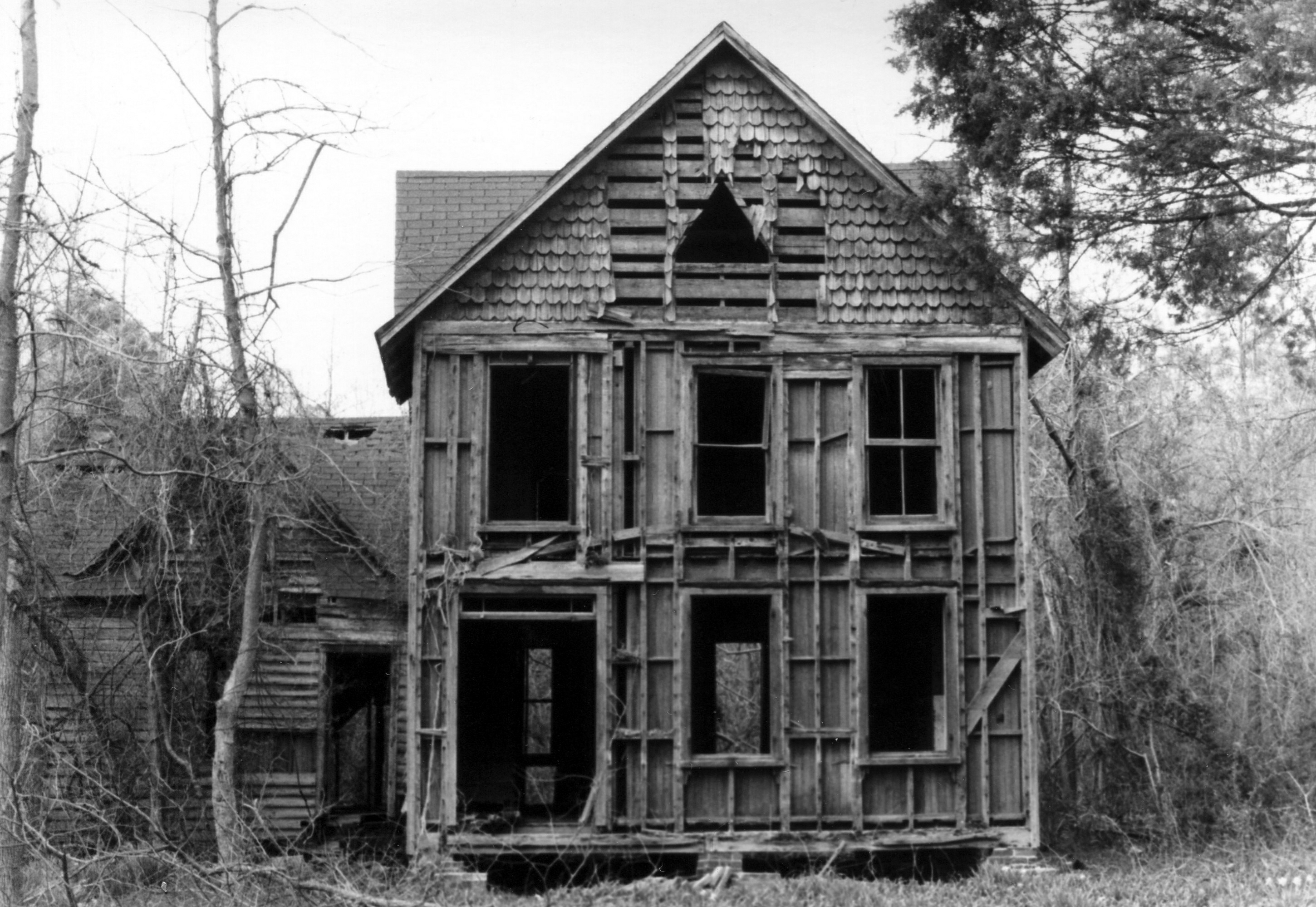
An abandoned house in White Marsh, Virginia

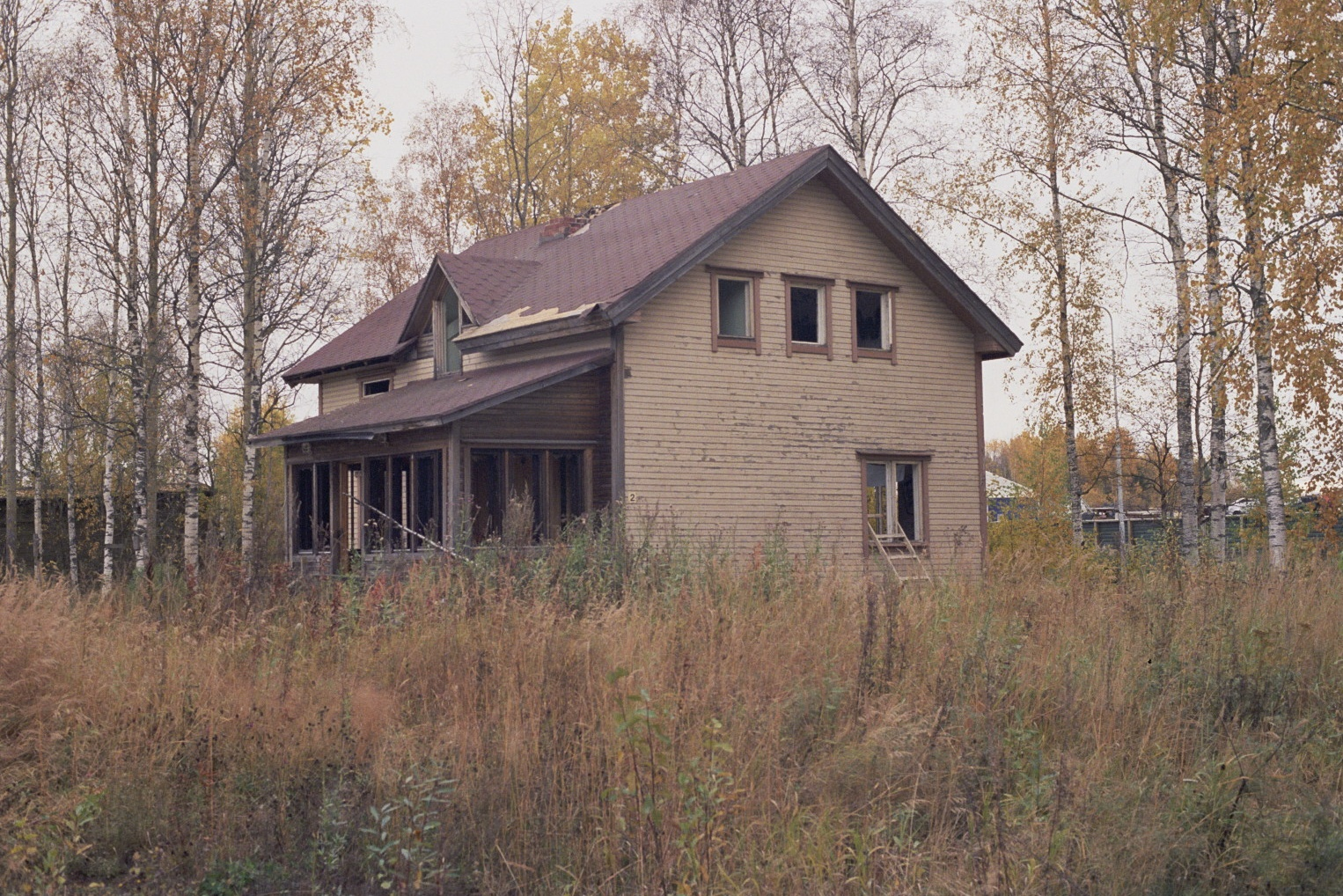
An abandoned house in Oulu, Finland in 2008

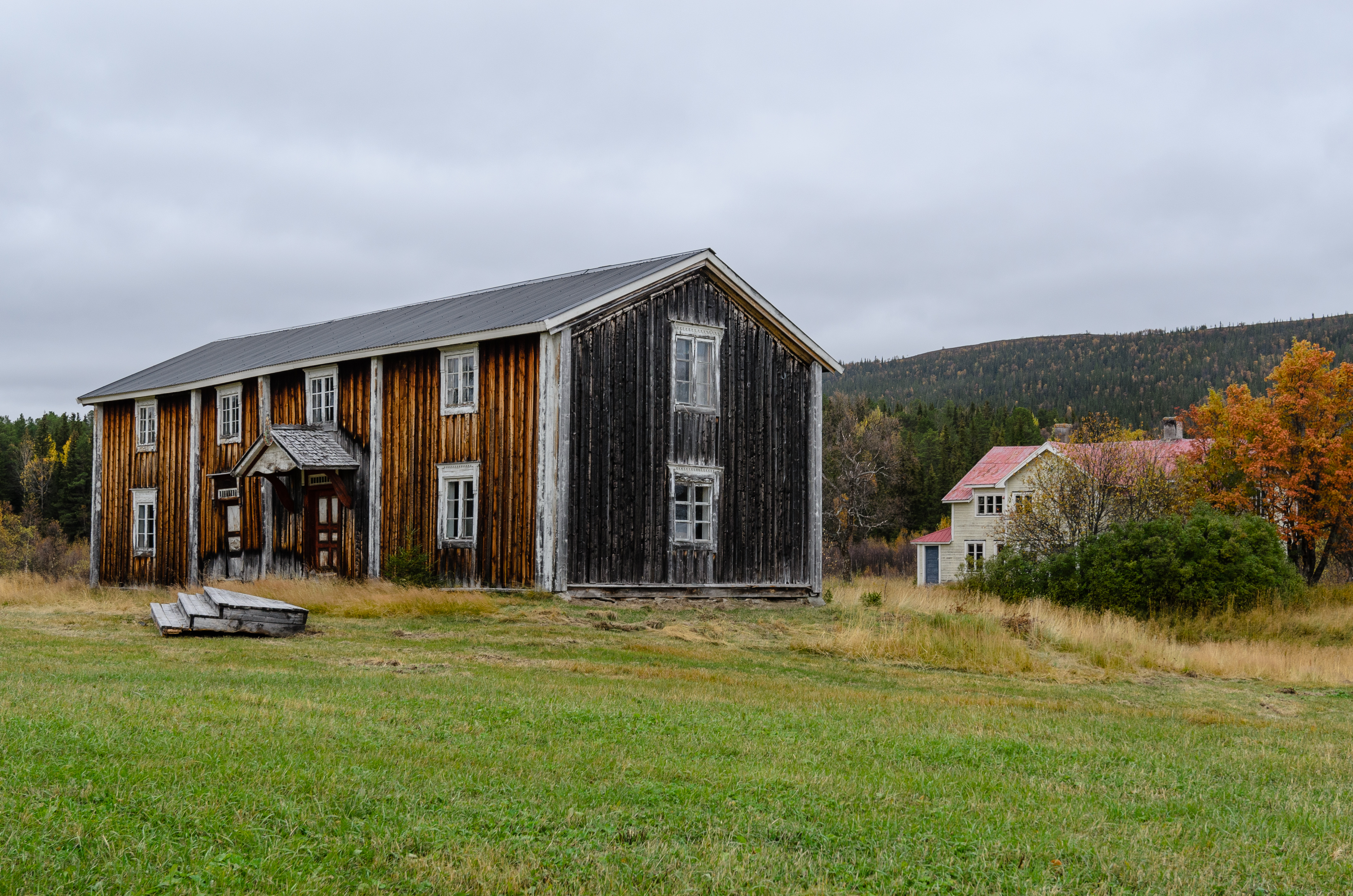
Abandoned farmhouses in Sweden circa 2015

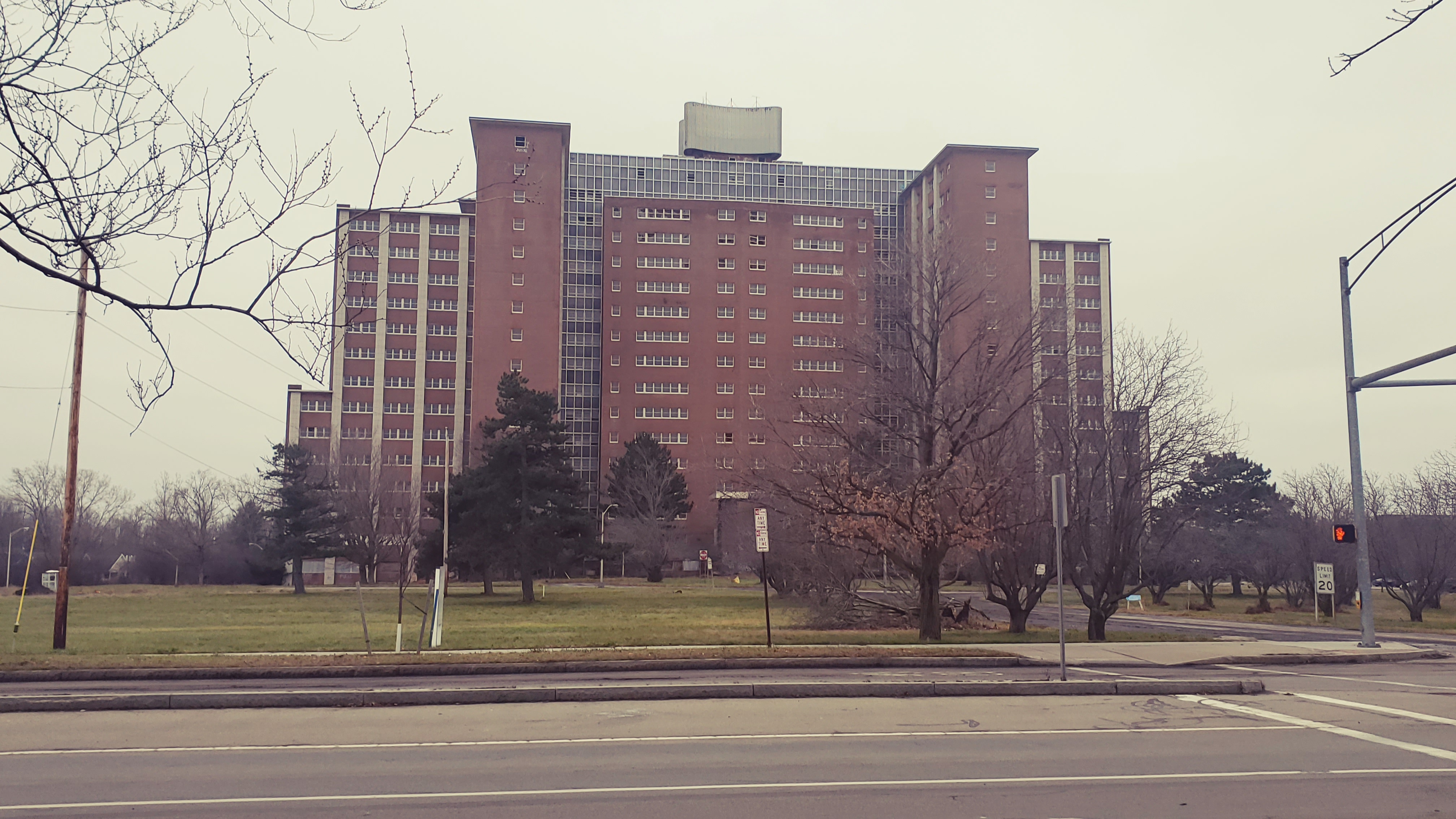
The Terrence Building, an abandoned former psychiatric hospital in Rochester, New York, in 2021

Intentional abandonment is also referred to as dereliction, and something voluntarily abandoned by its owner with the intention of not retaking it is a derelict. Someone that holds the property or to whom property rights have been relinquished is an abandonee. An item that has been abandoned is termed an abandum. A res nullius abandoned by its owner, leaving it vacant, belongs to no one.

In the American legal and media context, investigative reporters have relied on the concepts of abandonment or "constructive abandonment" in receiving documents from sources. Examples include Bob Woodward and Carl Bernstein's receipt of materials related to the Watergate scandal from the former apartment of John Mitchell, and more recently, Project Veritas' receipt of Ashley Biden's diary.

Examples

- Ghost town
- Abandoned amusement park
- Abandoned railway station
- Abandoned ship
- Abandoned village

=== Abandonment of easement ===
The relinquishment by a nonuser, for a specified period, of some accommodation or right in another's land, such as right-of-way or free access to light and air.

=== Abandonment of domicile ===
Occurs when one ceases to reside permanently in a former domicile, coupled with the intention of choosing a new domicile. The presumptions which will guide the court in deciding whether a former domicile has been abandoned or not must be inferred from the facts of each individual case. In the United States, a tenant is generally understood to have abandoned a property if they have fallen behind in rent and shown a lack of interest in continuing to live there. The landlord must then send notice of the intent to seize the property and wait a certain number of days to take action on it. How long the landlord has to wait depends on the value of the property. The landlord can keep the money up to the costs incurred as a result of the abandonment; the rest must be set aside for the former tenant, should they eventually return.

=== Abandonment of insurance ===
Abandonment occurs when the insured surrenders to the insurer all rights to damaged or lost property and claims payment for a total loss. Sometimes, this is permitted only when damage constitutes a constructive total loss. In marine insurance parlance, abandonment involves the surrender of a ship or goods to the insurer, who becomes the abandonee. Abandonment can also mean refusal to accept from a delivering carrier a shipment so damaged in transit as to be worthless.

=== Abandonment of copyright ===
Abandonment is recognized as the intentional release of material by a copyright holder into the public domain. However, statutory abandonment is legally a tricky issue that has little relevant case precedent to establish how an artist can abandon their copyright during their lifetime. Owners who wish for the public to make free use of their work often seek to do so by using a Creative Commons license and retaining copyright rather than relinquishing ownership entirely.

Copyright protection attaches to a work as soon as it is fixed in a tangible medium, whether the copyright holder desires this protection or not. Before the U.S. Copyright Act of 1976 an artist could abandon or forfeit their copyright by neglecting to comply with the relevant formalities. A difficulty arises when one tries to apply the doctrine of abandonment to present-day concerns regarding the abandonment or gifting of a digitized work to the public domain. The abandonment of a work is difficult to prove in court, though Learned Hand proposed a test which parallels other forms of abandonment law wherein an author or copyright holder could abandon their work if they intend to abandon it and commit an overt act to make public that intention.

=== Abandonment of trademark ===
Under US law, the abandonment of a trademark is understood to happen when the mark is not used for three or more years, or when it is deliberately discontinued; trademark law protects only trademarks being actively used and defended. So-called "zombie trademarks" may be used by other companies if they are deemed to have been abandoned by their original owners.

=== Abandonment of patent ===
Abandonment is relinquishment by an inventor of the right to secure a patent, in such a way as to constitute a dedication of the invention to public use. Under United States patent law, abandonment of a patent application occurs when either the required reply is not filed within the required time period or an express abandonment is filed.

=== Abandonment of public transportation systems ===
Abandonment is permission sought by or granted to a carrier by a state or federal agency to cease operation of all or part of a route or service. This has a legal signification in England recognized by statute, by authority of which the Board of Trade may, under certain circumstances, grant a warrant to a railway authorizing the abandonment of its line or part of it. Likewise, in the United States, the Surface Transportation Board grants permission to abandon railway lines.

== Failure to fulfill a responsibility ==
=== Abandonment rules in the military ===
The abandonment of a military unit by a soldier, a Marine, or an airman; or of a ship or a naval base by a sailor; can be called desertion; and being away from one's assigned location for a significant length of time can be called "Away Without Leave", "Absent Without Leave", or "Dereliction of duty". However, the term "Dereliction of Duty" also includes the offenses of being present but not carrying out one's assigned duties and responsibilities with the expected amount of effort, alertness, carefulness, ingenuity, and sense of duty.

=== Abandonment of contract ===
Abandonment of contract means failure to fulfil a contractual obligation, which will affect the abandoner's entitlement to the contractually agreed consideration, for example in the case of Sumpter v Hedges (1898).

=== Abandonment of family ===
Desertion refers to intentional and substantial abandonment, permanently or for a period stated by law, without legal excuse and without consent, of one's duties arising out of a status such as that of husband and wife or parent and child. It can involve the desertion of a spouse with the intention of creating a permanent separation. Desertion of one spouse by the other without just cause is called malicious abandonment. Child abandonment is often recognized as a crime, in which case the child is usually not physically harmed directly as part of the abandonment. Child abandonment is also called exposure or exposition, especially when an infant is left in the open.

=== Abandonment of a patient ===
In medicine, abandonment occurs when a health care professional (typically a physician, nurse, dentist, or paramedic) has already begun emergency treatment of a patient, and then suddenly walks away while the patient is still in need, without securing the services of an adequate substitute or giving the patient adequate opportunity to find one. It is a crime in many countries and can result in the loss of one's license to practice. Also, because of the public policy in favor of keeping people alive, the professional cannot defend themselves by pointing to the patient's inability to pay for services; this opens the medical professional to the possibility of exposure to malpractice liability beyond one's insurance coverage.

== See also ==
- Attempt#Abandonment, abandonment of criminal intent
- Public domain
- Squatting
- Urban exploration, abandoned buildings, structures, and vehicles (most commonly seafaring ones) are often favored targets for urban explorers
