= Arunas Chesonis =

American businessman

Arunas A. Chesonis
- Born: June 14, 1966 (age 58)
- Education: University of Rochester - William E. Simon Graduate School of Business Administration Honorary Doctorate of Laws 2004 University of Rochester - William E. Simon Graduate School of Business Administration Masters, Business Administration 1991 Massachusetts Institute of Technology B.S., Civil Engineering 1984
- Occupation(s): Chief executive officer; President, Director, Chairman of the Board

Arunas A. Chesonis is Chairman of the Board and CEO of Sweetwater Energy, a Rochester, New York renewable energy company. His appointment was announced on December 16, 2011. Chesonis previously served as the chairman of the board, president, and chief executive officer of PAETEC Corp. since May 1998, when he founded the company. In 2011, Chesonis sold PAETEC to Windstream Communications for $2.3 billion.

Arunas Chesonis is a civil engineering graduate of MIT and holds an M.B.A. from the William E. Simon Graduate School of Business Administration at the University of Rochester. He sits on the board of the MIT School of Engineering Dean's Advisory Council (DAC).
