= PAETEC Headquarters =

Cancelled building in Rochester, New York

Coordinates: 43.157°N 77.605°W

PAETEC Headquarters was a building proposed and approved for construction in Rochester, New York. It was to serve as the new headquarters for the Rochester-based telecommunications company, PAETEC Holding Corp. Its original proposed height was 40 floors, with a LEED-certified rooftop garden and was originally slated for completion in 2012. It would have become the tallest building in Rochester, exceeding the height of the 443-foot (135 m), 30-floor Xerox Tower built in the late 1960s. The tower was cancelled and a three-storey low rise office building was built on the site in the 2010s.

== Location ==
The proposed PAETEC building would have sat on the southeast corner of the intersection of Main Street and Clinton Avenue, taking advantage of both the refreshed (abated) skeletal structure of the former Seneca Building and adjacency to an enormous underground parking facility (1600+spaces) and truck tunnel. In addition to reusing the Seneca structure, PAETEC revealed plans at an RDDC luncheon in June 2010 that detailed the construction of a semi-transparent NOC on the north side of the building with viewing lines for pedestrians into its command center, additional office space on the south side of the structure, as well as retail on the first floor.

The new downtown headquarters for PAETEC was to be part of a redevelopment plan, with the state of New York using a $40 million state grant to clear the Midtown site.

== Midtown Plaza ==
It was announced on October 16, 2007, that Midtown Plaza will be knocked down to make way for the new PAETEC headquarters via eminent domain. Midtown Plaza was the first urban indoor mall in the United States.

== Fate ==
With the arrival of the Great Recession in the United States, PAETEC scaled down their plans significantly, first to a much smaller new building, and then to a simple re-use of the existing Seneca Building. With PAETEC's acquisition by Windstream Holdings, the new plan involved only two-thirds of the Seneca Building; the city then began considering options for the corner parcel on which the Tower would have been built. The corner was sold to Pike Construction who built a new headquarters for the Democrat and Chronicle on the site. The building, completed in 2016 is three stories like the current Seneca Building which currently houses offices for PAETEC's successor Windstream.
