= Frontier Southwest =

Verizon Southwest Incorporated
- Trade name: Verizon Communications of Texas
- Formerly: State Telephone Company of Texas; Southwestern Associated Telephone Company; General Telephone Company of the Southwest; GTE Southwest Incorporated; Frontier Southwest Incorperated
- Type: Subsidiary
- Industry: Telecommunications
- Founded: 1926; 100 years ago
- Headquarters: Irving, Texas, U.S.
- Products: Local Telephone Service
- Parent: GTE (1926–2000); Verizon (2000–2016, 2026-present); Frontier (2016-2026)

Verizon Southwest Incorporated is a Verizon Communications operating company in Texas. At its peak, Verizon Southwest served Arkansas, Oklahoma, Texas, and New Mexico.

== History ==
Its original name upon founding was State Telephone Company of Texas. It later changed its name to Southwestern Associated Telephone Company, and General Telephone Company of the Southwest.

In 1996, Contel of New Mexico and Contel of Texas were merged into GTE Southwest.

=== Fragmentation ===
In 1999, GTE announced that it was going to sell 1.3 million access lines. GTE agreed to sell 400,000 lines in New Mexico and lines in rural areas of Texas to a company called Valor Telecom (later absorbed into Windstream Holdings).

In 2000, Bell Atlantic purchased GTE and renamed itself Verizon. Shortly thereafter, the pending sale of GTE Southwest's operations to Valor Telecom was completed. GTE Southwest's Arkansas operations in Arkansas, Missouri, and Oklahoma were sold to CenturyTel to become CenturyTel of Northwest Arkansas (GTE's operations in Arkansas were completely sold off). GTE Southwest retained its name and operations in more populated areas of Texas.

GTE Southwest was the only former GTE operating company that did not change its official legal name under Verizon ownership.

=== Sale to Frontier ===
On February 5, 2015, Verizon Communications announced a sale of its wired telecom operations in California, Florida, and Texas to Frontier Communications. GTE Southwest was included in the sale. The transaction closed in the first half of 2016.

Following the sale, GTE Southwest was renamed Frontier Southwest Incorporated and began doing business under the name Frontier Communications of Texas.

=== Sale back to Verizon ===
On September 5, 2024 Verizon announced that it will acquire Frontier Communications for $20 billion. This acquisition was completed on January 20, 2026. As a result, Verizon took control of Frontier's operations, including regaining Frontier Southwest.

Frontier Southwest has renamed to Verizon southwest

== Sources ==
- FCC History: GTE Southwest, Inc. dba Verizon Southwest
