= CenturyTel of Northwest Arkansas =

CenturyTel of Northwest Arkansas, LLC
- Type: Private company (Subsidiary of CenturyLink)
- Industry: Telecommunications
- Predecessor: GTE Southwest
- Founded: 1999
- Headquarters: Little Rock, AR, US
- Products: Local Telephone Service
- Parent: Brightspeed
- Website: www.brightspeed.com

CenturyTel of Northwest Arkansas, LLC is a telephone operating of Brightspeed providing local telephone services to northwest Arkansas, Missouri, and Oklahoma. The company was founded in 1999 when CenturyTel purchased access lines in Arkansas from GTE which had been a part of GTE Southwest. in 2009, the company began doing business as CenturyLink reflecting its parent company's new name.

In 2022, the company was among the local operating companies sold by Lumen Technologies, as CenturyLink had become known, to form Brightspeed. The purchase closed on October 3, 2022.
