= RtBrick =

- Type: Private
- Industry: Telecommunications
- Founded: 2015
- Founder: Pravin S Bhandarkar, Hannes Gredler
- Headquarters: California, USA,
- Area served: Worldwide
- Key people: Pravin S Bhandarkar (CEO); Hannes Gredler (CTO); Richard Brandon (VP Marketing); Aruna Pai (VP Finance)
- Number of employees: 50+
- Website: www.rtbrick.com

RtBrick is a software company that specializes in providing routing operating systems for telcos and Internet Service Providers (ISPs), to build networks on open switch hardware. RtBrick supplies its software to work on open switch hardware in disaggregated networks, as defined by the Telecom Infra Project, specifically its Open Optical & Packet Transport working group.

== History ==
RtBrick was founded by Pravin S Bhandarkar (CEO) and Hannes Gredler (CTO) in California, USA, in 2015.

In October 2018, the company received a $6M investment from T-Capital Partners and Swisscom Ventures.

In April 2020, RtBrick launched its Network Operating System for broadband network operators.

In January 2021, Deutsche Telekom deployed RtBrick's software in its broadband network.

In August 2021, RtBrick became the first company to integrate with Broadcom's Q2C chipsets to provide a software Broadband Network Gateway (BNG) on multiple open hardware platforms.

In October 2021, RtBrick won the Best Fibre Access Solution of the Year: Innovator at the Broadband Awards, and the Fixed Network Evolution category at the' Glotel Awards.

In the same year, Pravin S Bhandarkar was included in Capacity Magazine's 2021 “Power 100” list.

In November 2022, the company broke the speed barrier for internet route convergence. In the same year, RtBrick won “Best Innovative Software Provider” in the 2022 Carrier Community Global Awards, and “Telecoms Project of the Year” at this year's National Technology Awards for the delivery of our disaggregated BNG in Deutsche Telekom. Also, Hannes Gredler was recognised on the Capacity Power 100 list.

In 2023, RtBrick won the Infrastructure Innovation of the Year at the UK IT Industry Awards, the Tech Trailblazers Networking Award, and a 2023 Communications Solutions Product of the Year by TMC. Additionally, the company received the silver medal in the Telecoms category at the 2023 Technology Merits Awards and the gold medal in the Next Gen Deployment Wireline category at the Telecoms Merit Awards.

In October 2023, RtBrick and Radisys partnered to provide disaggregated networks using open, cloud-native architecture.

In May 2024, RtBrick added Layer-2 Ethernet switching to its operating system.

In Nov 2024, a German Regional ISP Wobcom presented their experiences deploying Rtbrick Full Stack in their Metro network in the presentation: Modern Metro Networks: Everything, Everywhere, all at Once.

In March 2025, RtBrick added Carrier-Grade NAT (Carrier Grade Network Address Translation) on a disaggregated open switch for the first time.

In September 2025, Austrian ISP Citynet rolls out 10Gbps broadband with RtBrick’s disaggregated routing software using open switches from UfiSpace.

In October 2025, RtBrick is the first to bring SyncE timing and PTP to disaggregated networks.
