= Perinton, New York =

Town in New York, United States

- Town
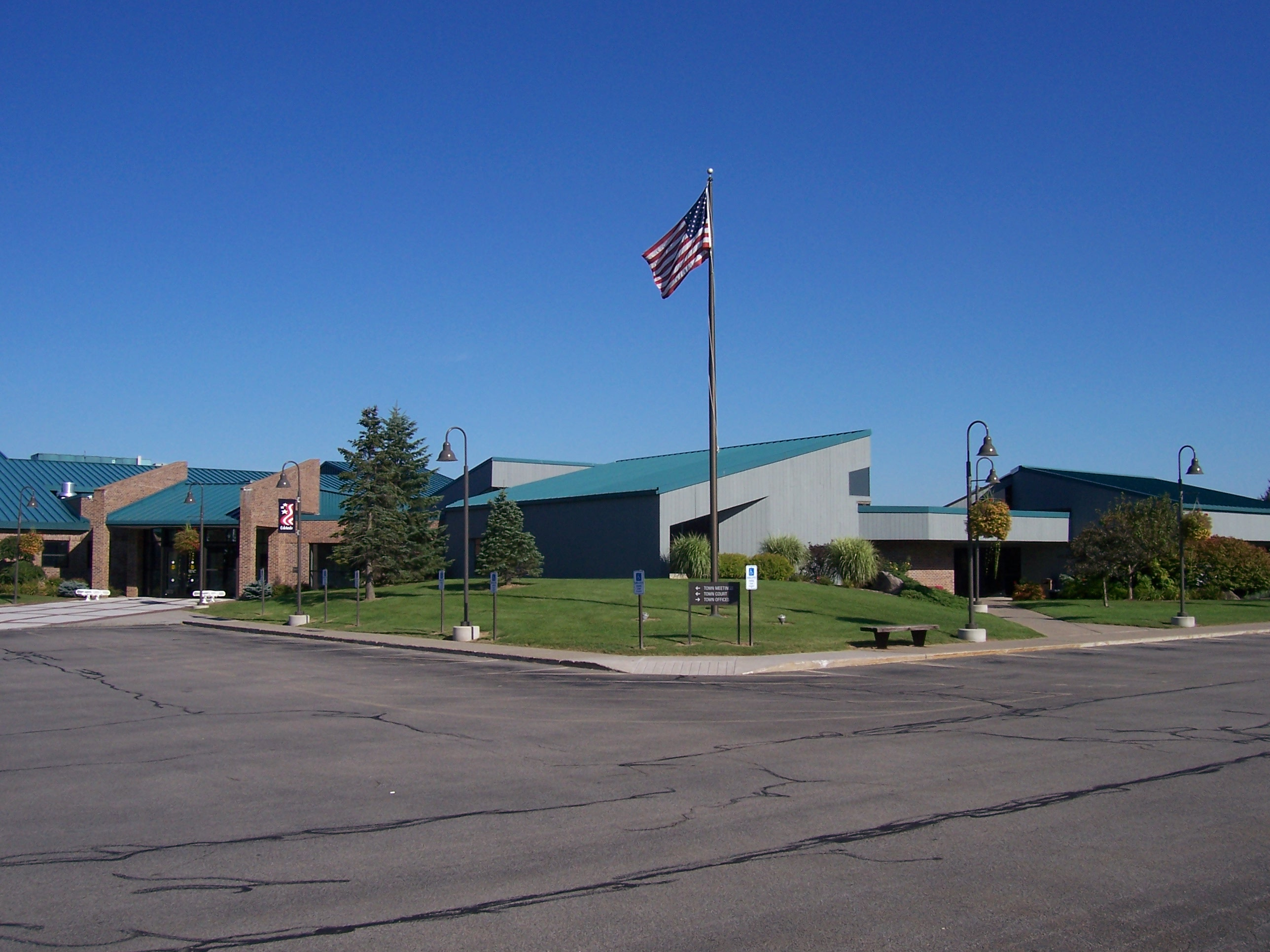
- Perinton Town Hall

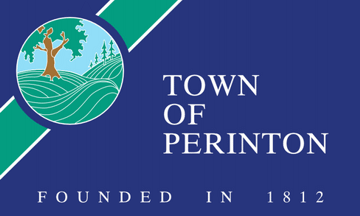
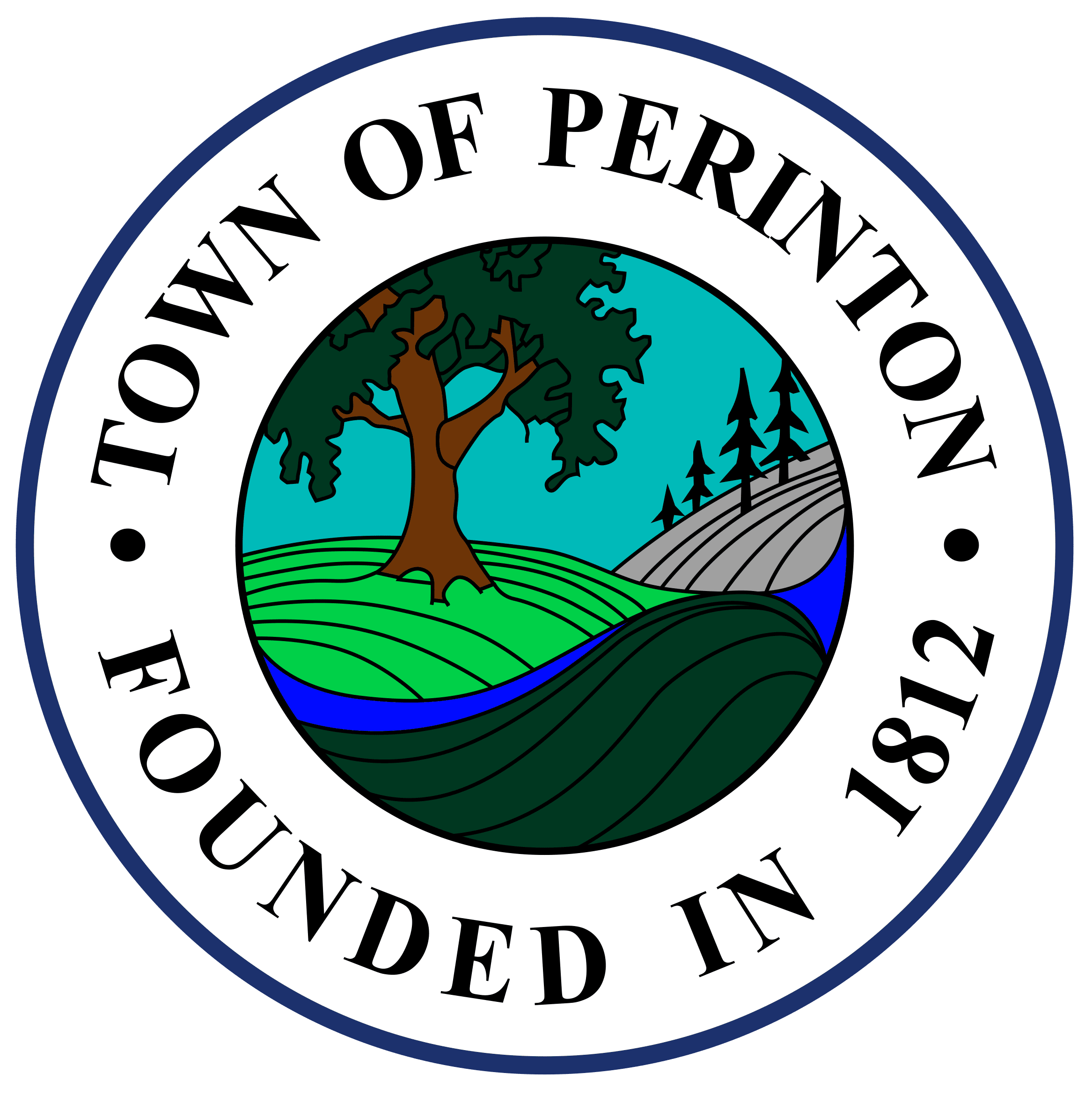
- Flag Seal

- Location in Monroe County and the state of New York

- Location of New York in the United States
- Coordinates: 43°5′N 77°26′W
- Country: United States
- State: New York
- County: Monroe
- Established: May 26, 1812; 214 years ago

Government
  - Town Supervisor: Jenn Townsend (D)
  - Town Council: Council Members: Meredith Stockman-Broadbent (D); Michael Folino (D); Emily Mischler (D); Dave Masterson(D)

Area
  - Total: 34.56 sq mi (89.5 km^{2})
  - Land: 34.20 sq mi (88.6 km^{2})
  - Water: 0.37 sq mi (0.96 km^{2})
- Elevation: 546 ft (166 m)

Population (2020)
  - Total: 47,479
  - Density: 1,388.5/sq mi (536.1/km^{2})
- Time zone: UTC−5 (EST)
  - Summer (DST): UTC−4 (EDT)
- ZIP Codes: 14450 (Fairport); 14445 (East Rochester); 14526 (Penfield); 14534 (Pittsford); 14564 (Victor)
- Area code: 585
- FIPS code: 36-055-57221
- Website: perinton.gov

Perinton (originally Perrinton (in federal censuses) and sometimes Perrington when still part of Ontario County) is a town in Monroe County, New York, United States. The population was 47,479 at the 2020 census.

The village of Fairport is within the town on the Erie Canal.

== History ==
In 1788, Oliver Phelps and Nathaniel Gorham purchased 2.6 million acres (11,000 km^{2}) of land in the wilderness of Western New York. William Walker of Canandaigua purchased 36 square miles (93 km^{2}) of the land and hired his brother Caleb and his cousin Glover Perrin (1762–1830) to survey and divide the land into 66 equal lots. The area was known as Township 12, Range 4, in the governmental unit of Northfield.

In 1793, Glover Perrin, his family, and his six siblings and their families, became the first permanent white settlers in the area. They settled in the flat and well-watered areas, specifically in the hamlet of Egypt (along the current Route 31) and Perinton Center (the intersection of Turk Hill and Ayrault roads). Early commercial ventures included mills, blacksmith shops, taverns, and inns.

By the late 1820s, the village of Fairport, located within the town on the Erie Canal, was becoming a booming canal town. Fairport, however, was not incorporated as a village until 1867.

From the 1850s to the 1950s, Perinton's history was primarily Fairport's history. The village was an active canal port and also a booming industrial town, echoing a trend that was occurring nationwide. As a result of the availability of cheap and easy transportation, which by the 1850s included the railroad as well as the canal, companies such as the DeLand Chemical Company, the Cobb Preserving Company, Taylor's Oil of Life, and eventually the American Can Company, grew and thrived. Services, including a fire department, a public library, street lighting, and parks, enhanced the life of the town and village. Residential areas, with homes built in a variety of architectural styles, were built around the bustling village center.

The town of Perinton, outside of Fairport, remained essentially rural until the 1950s. Today farms still exist in Perinton, but are surrounded by suburban subdivisions, office and industrial parks, and an impressive number of parks and open spaces. The village of Fairport still maintains the ambience of a canal town and capitalizes on the recreational aspects of that canal.

Most residents of the town of Perinton reside within both the Fairport Central School District and the Fairport postal district; due to this it is common for Perinton residents to describe their place of residence as "Fairport" even if they live outside of the village.

The town of Perinton was named one of the nation's 100 best places to live in 2008 by RelocateAmerica.com.

Richardson's Canal House was listed on the National Register of Historic Places in 1980.

== Geography ==
Perinton is in eastern Monroe County, 10 miles (16 km) southeast of Rochester. It is bordered by the coterminous town and village of East Rochester (west), and the towns of Victor (south), Macedon (east), Pittsford (west), and Penfield (north). The southern boundary of Perinton is also the Ontario County line. The hamlet of Egypt is in southeastern Perinton. Egypt Fire Department, Lollypop Farm, and Egypt Park are major Egypt landmarks. The southwestern portion of Perinton is called Bushnell's Basin and is home to the Bushnell's Basin Fire Department and Richardson's Canal House.

According to the United States Census Bureau, the town has a total area of 34.6 square miles (89.5 km^{2}), of which 34.2 square miles (88.5 km^{2}) are land and 0.35 square miles (0.9 km^{2}), or 1.07%, are water. Irondequoit Creek, a north-flowing direct tributary of Irondequoit Bay on Lake Ontario, crosses the southwest corner of the town.

== Parks and recreation ==
The town was recognized with the designation "Trail Town USA" by the American Hiking Society and often bills itself as such in public displays. Among other hiking areas, the town includes the Crescent Trail, a 35-mile (56 km) system of footpaths through both public and private land.

Parks and recreational areas in the town include:

- Beechwoods Park: hiking trail
- Egypt Park: baseball, tennis, playground
- Fellows Road Park: tennis, volleyball, basketball, baseball, playground, exercise trail, indoor space for rent
- Garnsey Arboretum: hiking, nature trail
- Horizon Hill: indoor space and small pavilion
- Indian Hill: hiking
- Kreag Road Park: baseball, basketball, tennis, playground, canal access, outdoor shelter
- Perinton Park: rowing boathouse, basketball, tennis, volleyball, playground, hiking trail, canal access, indoor space for rent
- Perinton Recreation Center: soccer, bandshell, playground, hiking trail
- Potter Park: soccer, baseball, tennis, teen center, skating rink
- Powder Mills Park: downhill skiing, cross-country skiing, fishing, playground, hiking, fish hatchery
- Spring Lake Park: fishing, baseball
- White Brook Nature Area

== Demographics ==
Historical population
Census	Pop.	Note	%±
1820	1,664		—
1830	2,106		26.6%
1840	2,513		19.3%
1850	2,891		15.0%
1860	3,015		4.3%
1870	3,261		8.2%
1880	4,030		23.6%
1890	4,450		10.4%
1900	4,703		5.7%
1910	6,566		39.6%
1920	7,799		18.8%
1930	9,854		26.3%
1940	10,170		3.2%
1950	11,559		13.7%
1960	16,314		41.1%
1970	31,568		93.5%
1980	41,802		32.4%
1990	43,015		2.9%
2000	46,090		7.1%
2010	46,462		0.8%
2020	47,479		2.2%
U.S. Decennial Census

As of the census of 2000, there were 46,090 people, 17,591 households, and 12,964 families residing in the town. The population density was 1,350.6 inhabitants per square mile (521.5/km^{2}). There were 18,041 housing units at an average density of 528.6 units per square mile (204.1 units/km^{2}). The racial makeup of the town was 93.90% White, 1.72% African American, 0.11% Native American, 2.84% Asian, 0.01% Pacific Islander, 0.45% from other races, and 0.97% from two or more races. Hispanic or Latino of any race were 1.43% of the population.

There were 17,591 households, out of which 36.4% had children under the age of 18 living with them, 64.4% were married couples living together, 7.1% had a female householder with no husband present, and 26.3% were non-families. 21.7% of all households were made up of individuals, and 7.5% had someone living alone who was 65 years of age or older. The average household size was 2.59 and the average family size was 3.06.

In the town, the population was spread out, with 26.7% under the age of 18, 5.0% from 18 to 24, 28.5% from 25 to 44, 28.1% from 45 to 64, and 11.6% who were 65 years of age or older. The median age was 39 years. For every 100 females, there were 93.1 males. For every 100 females age 18 and over, there were 89.2 males.

The median income for a household in the town was $69,341, and the median income for a family was $80,606. Males had a median income of $60,587 versus $36,113 for females. The per capita income for the town was $31,948. About 1.8% of families and 2.9% of the population were below the poverty line, including 2.8% of those under age 18 and 3.4% of those age 65 or over.

== Economy ==
One of the major companies in Perinton is PAETEC.

== Emergency response in Perinton ==
Access to emergency services is obtained by dialing 911, which connects to the city of Rochester's emergency communications department (911 center). For the town of Perinton, the Monroe County sheriff's department provides primary law enforcement for the town's residents with the exception of the village of Fairport, which has its own police department.

For fire protection services, the town is divided into four districts:

- Bushnell's Basin Fire Protection District (Bushnell's Basin Fire Department)
- Egypt Fire Protection District (Egypt Fire Department)
- Forest Hills Fire Protection District (East Rochester Fire Department)
- Perinton Fire Protection District (Fairport Fire Department)

Each of the fire departments is staffed by volunteers and provide 24-7 fire protection, rescue and non-transport emergency medical services to the town's residents and visitors.

Primary emergency medical response is provided by Perinton Ambulance, which provides advanced life support by trained paramedics, 24-7.

== Communities and locations in Perinton ==
- Bushnell's Basin – a hamlet in the southwestern part of the town on NY 96.
- Egypt – a hamlet in the eastern part of the town on NY 31.
- Fairport – the village of Fairport is in the northwestern portion of the town at the junction of NY 31F and NY 250.
- Fullam's Corners - a hamlet on O'Connor Road, Route 31F and Jefferson Avenue, west of Fairport village.
- Hannans Corner - a hamlet at the intersection of NY 250 and NY 31 (Palmyra Road).
- Perinton Square Mall - a shopping mall located west of Hannans Corner, on NY 31.
