= PAETEC Holding Corp. =

Defunct American corporation

PAETEC Holding Corporation
- Company type: Public
- Traded as: NASDAQ: PAET
- Industry: Business voice and data telecommunications
- Founded: Rochester, New York May 1998
- Defunct: December 2011
- Fate: acquired by Windstream Communications
- Headquarters: Perinton, New York
- Area served: California, Delaware, Florida, Iowa, Michigan, New Jersey, New York, North Carolina, Pennsylvania, South Carolina, Virginia
- Key people: Arunas A. Chesonis, CEO, Chairman, & Founder of PAETEC; Richard T. Aab, Vice Chairman & Co-Founder of US LEC
- Services: Voice services Data services Software solutions Customer premises equipment leasing Managed services
- Revenue: ▲US$1624 million (2010)
- Operating income: ▼US$45 million (2010)
- Net income: ▼US$(58 million) (2010)
- Total assets: ▲US$2008 million (2010)
- Total equity: ▼US$137 million (2010)
- Number of employees: ▲4639 (2010)
- Subsidiaries: 47 total (2010)
- Website: www.paetec.com

PAETEC Holding Corporation was a Fortune 1000 telecommunications company headquartered in Perinton, New York, United States. It was founded as the private company PaeTec Communications, Inc. in 1998 by Arunas A. Chesonis. In 2007 it merged with US LEC and then Cavalier Telephone Company and became a publicly traded company, and in 2011 it was acquired by Windstream Communications.

PAETEC provided local and long-distance voice services, data and Internet services, and software applications, among others. PAETEC provided service to medium and large businesses, colleges and universities, hospitals, hotels, governmental organizations and other institutions within its service area.

== Mergers and acquisitions ==
- September 9, 1999 – Purchased CAMPUSLINK Communications Systems, a privately owned telecommunications company based in Ann Arbor, Michigan.
- August 19, 2004 – Purchased Covista North East Call Zone (Covista Still Privately owned company, also operating as Total Tel)
- January 4, 2005 – Purchased American Long Lines, a privately owned telecommunications company.
- February 28, 2007 – Acquired Charlotte, North Carolina–based telecommunications company US LEC, becoming the publicly traded PAETEC Holding Corp
- October 12, 2007 – Acquired Allworx Corp
- February 8, 2008 – Acquired McLeodUSA
- December 6, 2010 – Acquired Cavalier Telephone Corporation
- December 28, 2010 – Acquired FTS Ltd. subsidiary, Leap RevChain
- May 31, 2011 – Acquired XETA Technologies, Inc.
- December 1, 2011 – Acquired by Windstream Communications

PAETEC owned the naming rights to PAETEC Park, a soccer-specific stadium in nearby Rochester, New York, from its opening in 2006 to 2008.

== Name origin ==
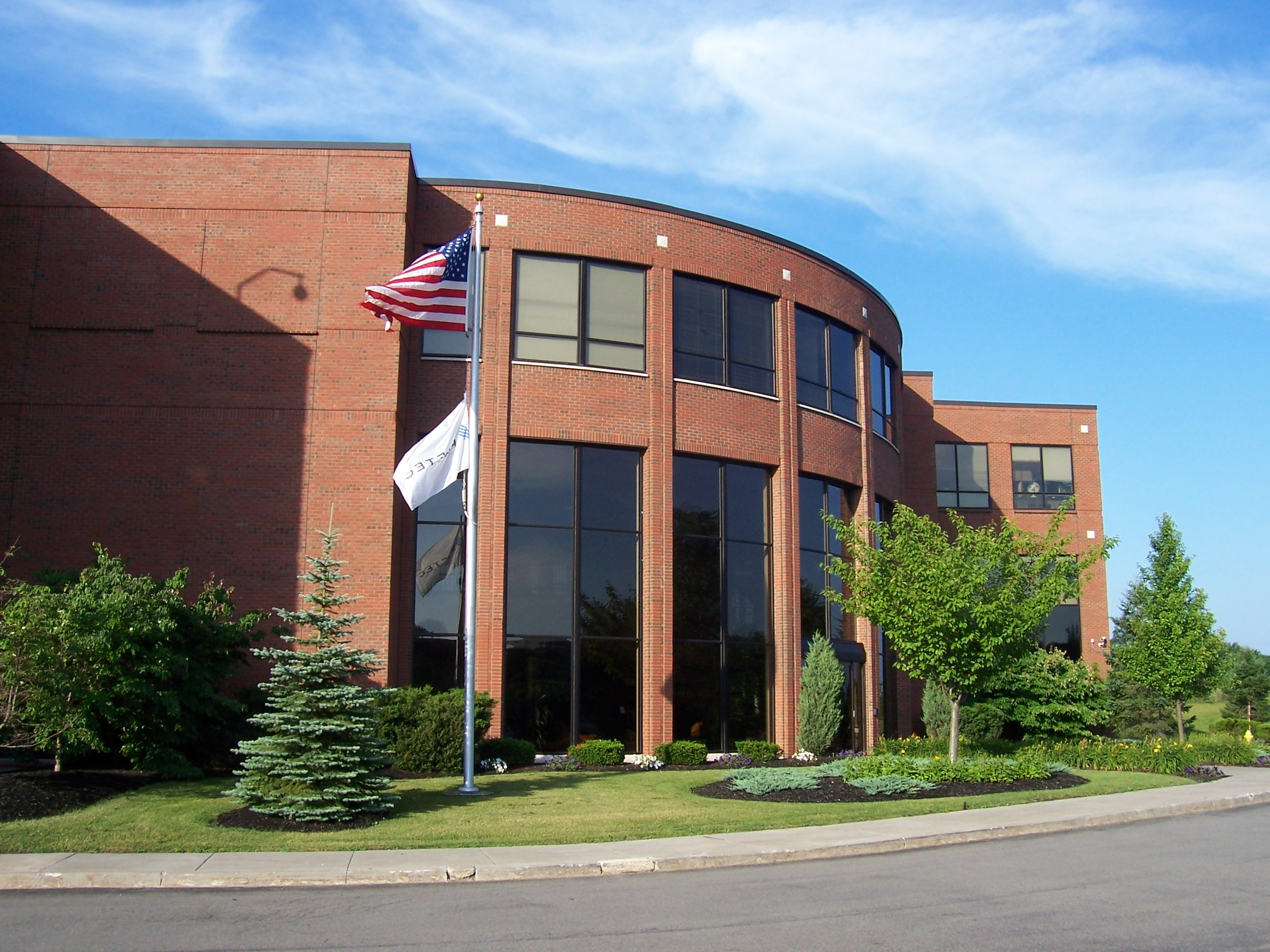
Former headquarters in Perinton, New York, now a Windstream regional office

The name PAETEC was derived from the initials of the first names of its founder's wife Pam and four children Adam, Erik, Tessa and Emma. In earlier days, the name was displayed as PaeTec Communications, Inc. After the acquisition of US LEC, the new merged entity became PAETEC Holding Corp., however, the company is simply referred to as PAETEC.

== Controversy ==
Since its acquisition, PAETEC (also known as STARNET PAETEC) has been listed several times as the provider of VOIP services to phone scammers.

== Other ==
- October 16, 2007 – New York State Governor Eliot Spitzer and PAETEC CEO Arunas Chesonis announced plans to tear down Rochester's Midtown Plaza, to build a new corporate headquarters. These plans have since been canceled.
- PAETEC sponsored Rochester Institute of Technology's Imagine RIT: Innovation and Creativity Festival on May 3, 2008.
