= Gere Kavanaugh =

American industrial designer

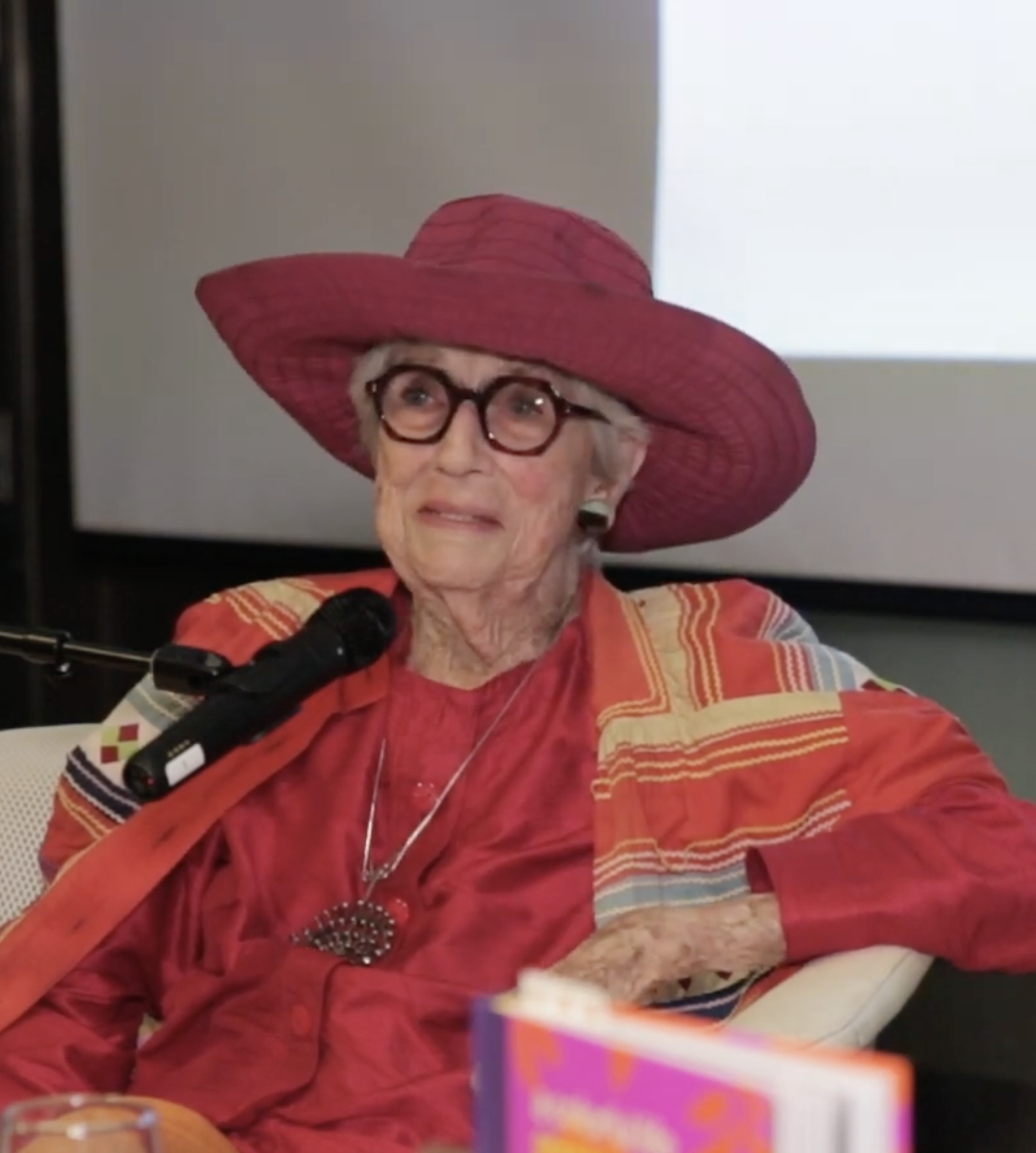
- Kavanaugh at Cooper Hewitt (2019)
- Born: 1929 (age 96–97); Memphis, Tennessee, U.S.
- Known for: Industrial designer, textile designer

Geraldine (Gere) Kavanaugh (born 1929) is an American textile, industrial, and interior designer known for a multidisciplinary approach that spans fabrics, furniture, interiors, exhibitions, and public art. A pioneer in postwar American design, Kavanaugh’s work is characterized by its bold use of color, playful forms, and integration of various craft traditions.

== Early life and education ==
Born in Memphis, Tennessee, she began formal art education at eight and later earned a BFA from the Memphis Academy of Arts. In 1952, she became the third woman to receive an MFA in design from the Cranbrook Academy of Art, joining the ranks of notable women alumni like Ray Eames and Florence Knoll.

== Career ==
=== General Motors and the “Damsels of Design” ===
After graduating from Cranbrook, Kavanaugh joined General Motors’ Styling Division, becoming part of the all-female design team known as the “Damsels of Design.” There, she worked on exhibition designs, model kitchens, and promotional materials, contributing to projects like the 1958 “Feminine Auto Show.” Using net-like material to create three cages filled with live canaries, who sang when the lights were on, she also created a centerpiece in the middle which resembled a dress. Colored cellophane beneath the cages floors enhanced the dream-like atmosphere with reflections of rainbows on the floor. Completing the set were chiffon panels and white hyacinths. Kavanaugh advocated the use diversity and the importance of form's relationship to function.

=== Move to Los Angeles and Independent Practice ===
In 1960, she left GM for a position in the Detroit offices of architect Victor Gruen, known as the father of the shopping mall. There, she designed interiors of retail stores and shopping centers across the country. The firm later moved to Los Angeles where she became friends with Frank Gehry. She later shared studio space with Gehry, Don Chadwick, and Deborah Sussman where she founded Gere Kavanaugh/Designs (GK/D) in 1964.

=== Geraldine Fabrics ===
In 1970, Kavanaugh launched Geraldine Fabrics, producing a line of textiles that showcased her signature use of color and pattern. Although the venture was short-lived, it reflected her entrepreneurial spirit and commitment to design innovation.

== Design philosophy ==
Kavanaugh’s work is noted for its exuberant use of color, often drawing inspiration from nature and folk art. She has stated, “I love color; I could eat color,” emphasizing its central role in her designs.

== Notable projects ==
- Joseph Magnin Stores: Collaborated with Frank Gehry and Deborah Sussman on retail interiors in the 1960s.
- Nixon Presidential Library: Designed the research library interiors, integrating color and form to enhance the user experience.
- CB2 Collaborations: Developed a line of dinnerware and holiday ornaments, bringing her design sensibility to a broader audience.
- Gere Easy Chair: Designed and prototyped by Kavanaugh in the mid-1970s, Gere Easy Chair is an upholstered swivel lounge chair, mass-produced by Detroit-based furniture company Floyd since 2023. It's made of plywood and Sonotube.

== Exhibitions and collections ==
Kavanaugh’s work has been featured in numerous exhibitions, including:

- “Pacific Standard Time: Art in L.A. 1945–1980” at the Craft and Folk Art Museum.
- “California’s Designing Women: 1896–1986” at The Autry Museum.

Her designs are part of permanent collections at institutions such as the Los Angeles County Museum of Art and the American Textile Museum.

== Awards and recognition ==
- AIGA Medal (2016): Honored for her contributions to American design.
- NEA Grants: Received multiple National Endowment for the Arts grants for product development and exhibition design.
- She was the first interior designer to win a COLA grant from the Los Angeles Cultural Affairs Department.
- She was awarded the Julia Morgan Icon Award at the Los Angeles Design Festival in 2014.
- She also received the American Institute of Graphic Arts (AIGA) Medal in 2016.

== Legacy ==
Over the years, Kavanaugh has designed ceramics, light fixtures, homes, store interiors, textiles, town clocks, and furniture. In the 1970s, she worked with furniture company Terra to design the “California umbrella.” Unable to patent the design, she started an alumni product archive at Cranbrook where alums could donate work which companies could reproduce and pay royalties directly to the school.

Kavanaugh lives in Angelino Heights.
