= Windstream Holdings =

Provider of voice and data network communications

Windstream Holdings, Inc.
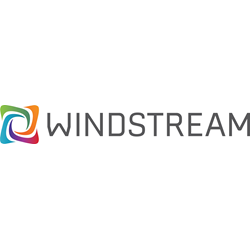
- Type: Subsidiary
- Industry: Telecommunications
- Founded: 2006; 20 years ago
- Successor: Uniti
- Headquarters: Little Rock, Arkansas, United States
- Key people: Paul H. Sunu (president & CEO)
- Revenue: US$4 billion (2023)
- Number of employees: 11,080 (2019)
- Parent: Uniti Group Inc.
- ASN: 7029
- Website: www.windstream.com

Windstream Holdings, Inc., trading as Windstream Communications, is a provider of voice and data network communications to businesses across the United States. Under the Kinetic brand, it offers broadband, phone and digital streaming TV services to consumers within its coverage area. It is the ninth largest residential telephone provider in the country with service covering more than 8.1 million people in 21 states.

== History ==
Valor Telecom was formed in 2000 to take over GTE Southwest assets that Verizon was selling following its acquisition of GTE. In 2006, Windstream Corporation was formed through the spinoff of Alltel's landline business and merger with Valor.

In 2007, Windstream Corp. purchased CT Communications for $585 million adding 158,000 access lines and 29,000 broadband customers. The 2009 acquisition of D&E Communications of Ephrata, Pennsylvania for $330 million added a further 165,000 access lines and 44,000 broadband customers.

The next year's purchase of Iowa Telecom for $1.1 billion added 256,000 access lines, 95,000 broadband customers, 26,000 digital TV customers and a presence in rural Iowa and Minnesota. In 2010, the firm acquired Nuvox, previously formed from a merger of NuVox Communications, NewSouth Communications, FDN Communications, Gabriel Communications and Trivergent Communications.

On August 17, 2010, it announced that it had entered into a definitive agreement to acquire Q-Comm Corporation in a transaction valued at approximately $782 million. This includes Q-Comm's wholly owned subsidiaries Kentucky Data Link, Inc. (KDL), a fiber services provider in 22 states and Norlight, Inc., a CLEC primarily serving the Midwest. Q-Comm subsidiaries nGenX and Cinergy Metronet will be spun off as independent companies prior to the close of the deal.

In November 2010, Windstream announced that it would acquire Hosted Solutions for $310 million; Hosted is a North Carolina–based managed hosting, cloud and colocation provider with a footprint of five datacenters in Cary, Raleigh and Charlotte, North Carolina as well as Boston. In 2011, the firm acquired PAETEC Holding Corp., a Rochester, New York telecommunications company.

On October 6, 2014, Windstream, in partnership with Ericsson, announced plans to launch its next-gen TV service Kinetic.

On April 24, 2015, it announced that it had completed the tax-free spinoff of "select telecommunications network assets," into Communications Sales and Leasing Inc. (CS&L). On April 17, 2017, one after selling its remaining shares in CSAL and one after merging with EarthLink, the company announced that it would acquire Broadview Networks for $227 million.

In 2019, the U.S. District Court of the Southern District of New York ruled that Windstream had defaulted on bond payments and its stock value fell by 60%. It filed for Chapter 11 bankruptcy in response to a judgment against the company for $310 million. The following year, it emerged from bankruptcy as a privately held company, having reduced its debt by over $4 billion.

On July 24, 2025, one year after beginning merger talks, Windstream and Uniti Group received all necessary approvals to carry out the merger. On August 1, Uniti Group Inc. announced that this transaction had been completed.

== See also ==
- List of United States telephone companies
