= David Jarrett Collins =

American inventor and businessman (1936–2022)

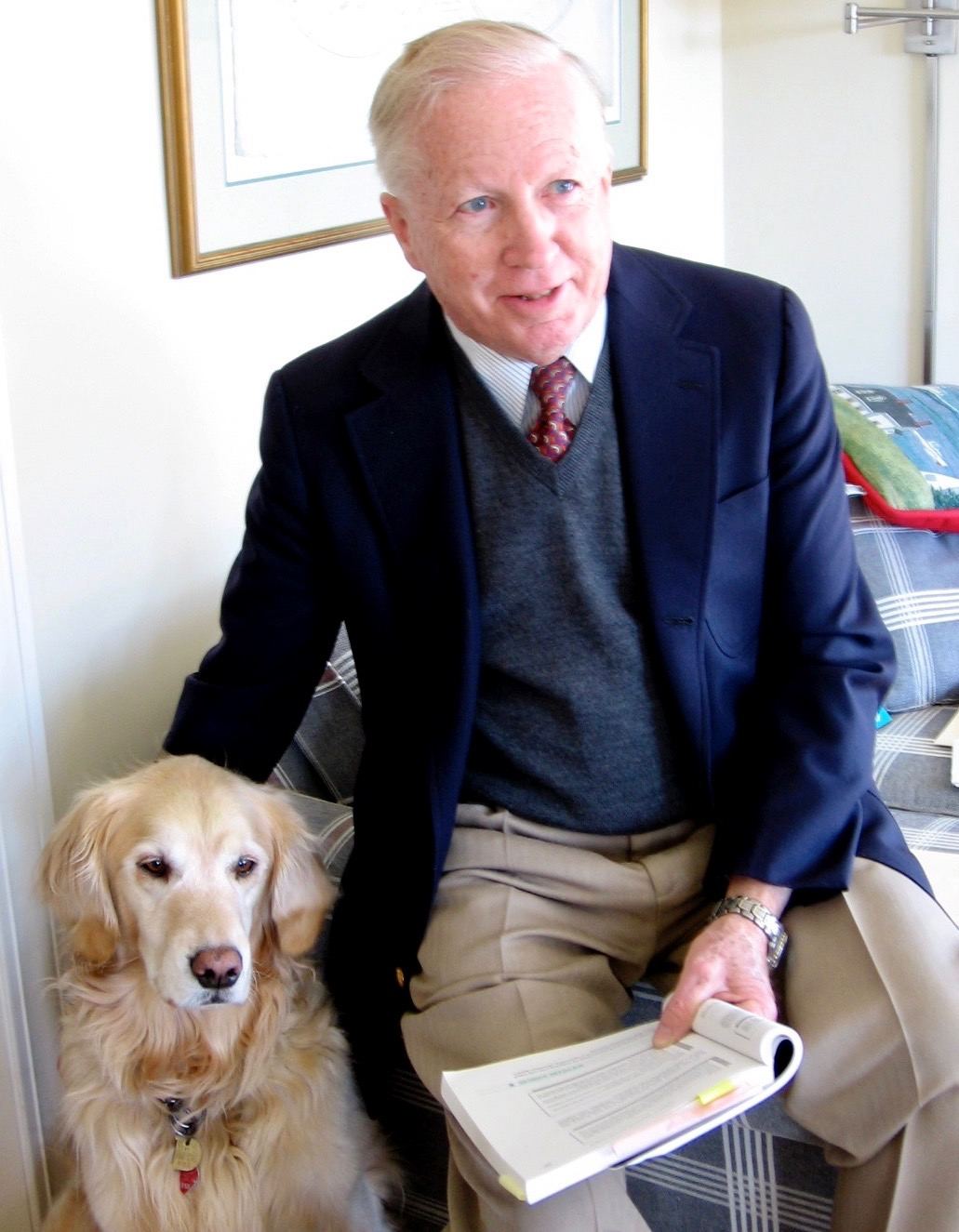
- Born: February 11, 1936; Philadelphia, Pennsylvania, US
- Died: March 12, 2022 (aged 86); Duxbury, Massachusetts, US
- Education: Villanova University; MIT Sloan School of Management
- Occupations: Inventor, businessman
- Known for: Creating barcode and scanning technology

David Jarrett Collins (February 11, 1936 – March 12, 2022) was an inventor and businessman whose career was focused on bringing barcode technology into the mainstream. While at Sylvania in 1960, he led a team that developed the first functional barcode system for tracking railroad cars, and subsequently worked on developing laser barcode systems.

== Early life and education ==
David Jarrett Collins was born and raised in Philadelphia, Pennsylvania. He attended La Salle College High School, graduating in 1953, and graduated from Villanova University in 1957 with a Bachelor of Science degree in Civil Engineering. He received his Master of Science in Industrial Management from MIT's Sloan School of Management in 1959.

== Career ==
After his graduate studies at MIT were complete, Collins worked for Sylvania Electric Products (Sylvania) in Waltham, MA. While at Sylvania, he managed the development of the first commercial linear barcode: KarTrak, for Automatic Car Identification (ACI). KarTrak used blue and red reflective stripes, as well as black and white stripes attached to the side of railroad cars, encoding a six-digit company identifier and a four-digit car number. At the peak, 95 percent of rail cars had a KarTrak code on the side.

In 1961, Collins left Sylvania to start the Computer Identics Corporation with a goal of creating a laser scanner capable of reading small barcode labels as seen today.

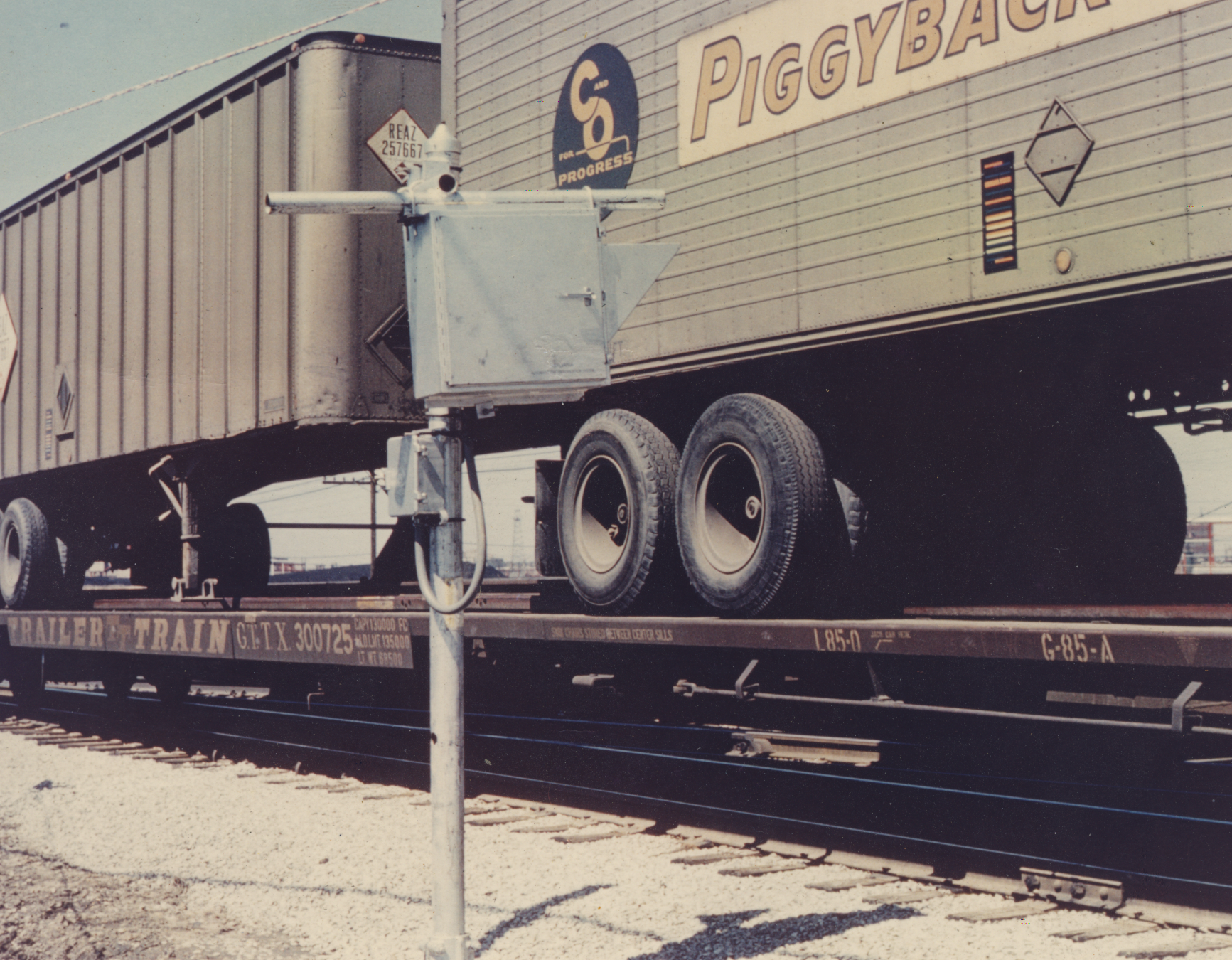
KarTrak scanner installation in Midland, MI

In 1969, Computer Identics sold the world’s first commercial laser scanner to General Motors, who used it to identify and record car components on a Pontiac assembly line. That same year Computer Identics installed scanners and a Digital Equipment Corporation PDP-8 mini-computer at a General Trading Company plant in Carlstadt, NJ to track and assemble grocery orders. It scanned boxes on a conveyor belt so they could be diverted to the appropriate loading dock. In 1971, Computer Identics delivered the first scanners used for package recognition, early versions of the ones now used by delivery companies.

The New York City Marathon approached Collins about using barcode for scoring in 1977. At the 1984 Summer Olympics in Los Angeles, organizers used Computer Identics scanners to read barcodes printed on the badges of athletes, journalists, and staff members. Also in 1984, Collins' company, Computer Identics, developed Mac-Barcode® Software, the first WYSIWYG barcode label composition software, for the newly introduced Apple Macintosh.

Following his time at Computer Identics, Collins formed Data Capture Institute, a research and consulting firm specializing in automatic identification technology. There he and his associates provided system design and support to clients including the Uniform Code Council (GS1). In his work for GS1, he developed the industry standard application identifier (AI) dictionary that classifies data collection formats.

Collins served as Chairman of the Board for A2B Tracking Solutions, of Portsmouth, RI.

== Patents ==
- Identification and registration system, (1972)
- Label reading system, (1973)
- Asset tracking within and across enterprise boundaries, (2001)
- System and method of validating asset tracking codes, (2009)
- Secure asset tracking system, (2015)

== Distinctions ==
- Author of Using Bar Code: Why It’s Taking Over (1994)
- Author of Automatic Car Identification (ACI): The key to better car utilization (1975)
- Member of the Department of Defense Integrated Product Team directing UID bar code and RFID tags to assets in the supply chain
- Past member of the Department of Homeland Security RFID Working Group.
- Founder and past Director of AIM Global, the Association of Automatic Identification and Mobility

== Awards ==
- 2014 – La Salle College High School Hall of Fame
- 2011 – US Congressional Citation for his role as the "Father of the Barcode Industry"
- 1993 – The J. Stanley Morehouse Memorial Award – Villanova U. School of Engineering for: "Outstanding leadership at the highest level."
- 1992 – Richard Dilling Award
