= Sylvania (brand) =

Canadian electronics corporation

- Company type: Private
- Industry: Consumer electronics Home appliances
- Founded: 1990; 36 years ago
- Headquarters: Toronto, Ontario, Canada
- Parent: Curtis International

Sylvania is a Canadian multinational electronics corporation headquartered in Toronto, Ontario, Canada. The company is owned in North America by Osram Sylvania and, outside of North America, Feilo Sylvania. The two license the brand to other companies for various products. The Sylvania brand was originally owned by Sylvania Electric Products.
