= KarTrak =

Obsolete colored barcode system designed to identify railcars

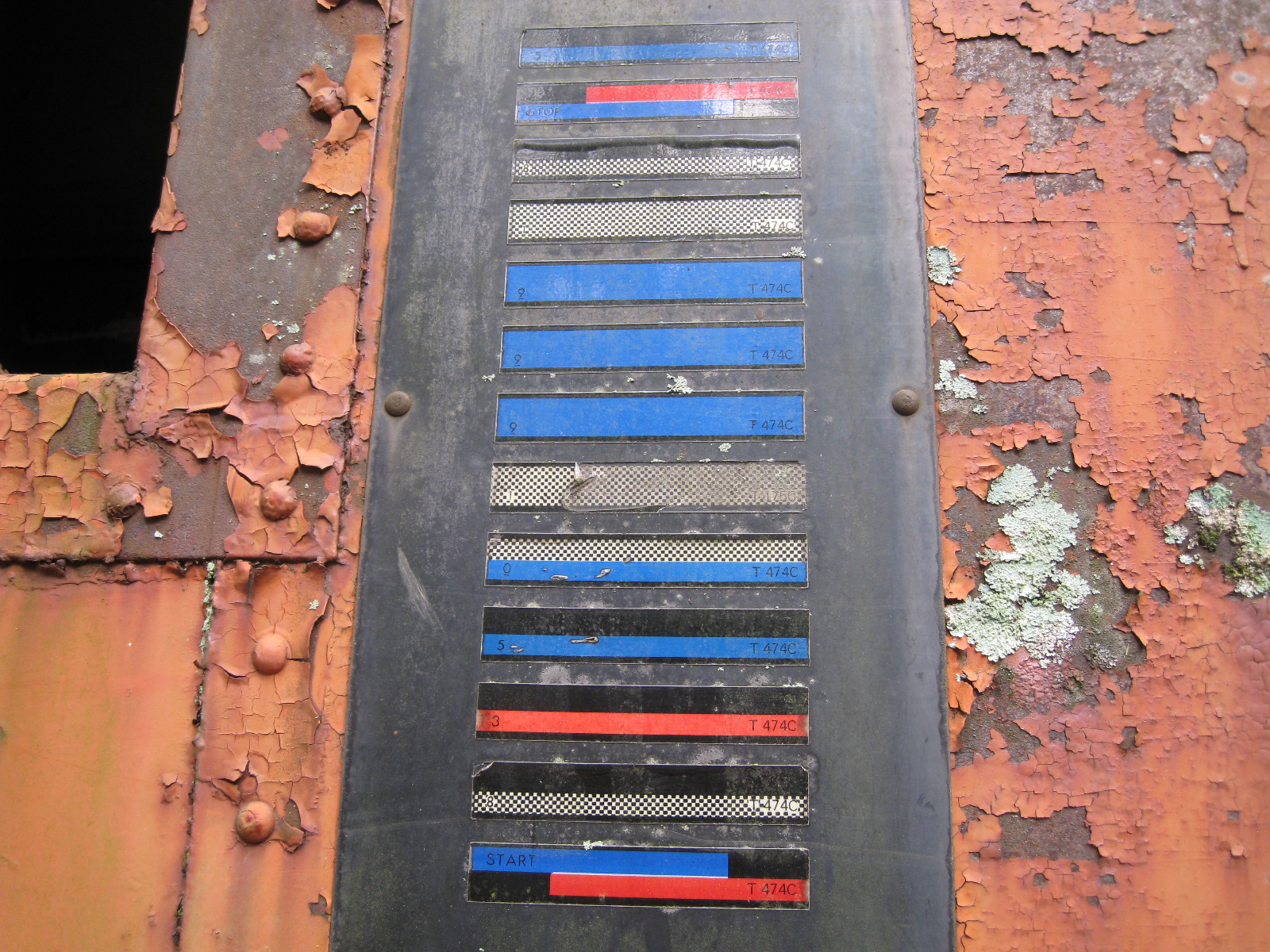
Detail of a KarTrak code. This barcode is Start 8350199918 Stop 5

KarTrak, sometimes KarTrak ACI (Automatic Car Identification) or just ACI, was a colored barcode system designed to automatically identify railcars and other rolling stock. KarTrak was made a requirement in North America in 1967, but technical problems led to the abandonment of the system by around 1977.

== History ==
=== Issue and early development ===
Railroads have struggled with the tracking of railroad cars across their vast networks, a problem that became worse with the increased growth of systems and movement of rail cars from network to network via interchange. A railroad's car could end up a thousand miles away on another company's tracks. This did not factor in the ever growing fleet of privately owned railroad cars, from companies such as TrailerTrain and Union Tank Car Company, who owned massive fleets of railroad cars, but were not actually railroads. A missing car took time to track down, often requiring workers to walk rail yards looking at cars until it was located.

In 1959 David Jarrett Collins approached his employer GTE Sylvania to use a newly developed computer system in conjunction with scanners to track railroad cars. The idea was inspired by Collins summers in college where he worked for the Pennsylvania Railroad. During the early portion of the 1960s, Sylvania's Applied Research Lab team met with representatives of various railroads to gain insight into their needs and wants for a car tracking system. Features and design aspects desired by the railroads included:

- Low label cost, approximately $1 ($9.66 in 2025) per label
- Ability to scan labels at 0 - 60 miles per hour (97 km/h)
- A label life span of 7 years
- Scanners capable of scanning at around 9 feet (2.7 m), to enable scanning of labels on railcars, shipping containers and piggyback highway trailers
- Scanners capable of operating in isolated locations, and resistant to gunfire.

KarTrak's development testing occurred in 1961 on the Boston & Maine Railroad, using passenger trains and a gravel train that did not leave the Boston & Maine railroad network. Using trains that were always confined to Boston & Maine enabled easy testing, refinement and demonstration the KarTrak system, as cars fitted with the system were always around and their movements known.

Sylvania early on moved to sell KarTrak to smaller, "captive" railroad systems. Captive railroads, (Note: Some examples of this type a captive railroad include:Black Mesa and Lake Powell Railroad, Deseret Power Railway, Muskingum Electric Railroad.) such as those used to supply coal to a power station on an isolated system were a prime environment, as issues caused by cars not equipped by KarTrak would not occur due to the lack of cars entering or leaving the railroad, and all cars being owned by the railroad in question and thus able to be equipped with labels. In three years, 50,000 railroad cars were equipped KarTrak labels. This served a dual purpose, allowing Sylvania to generate money to invest in further development of the system, while also denying a foothold to competing car tracking systems.

KarTrak was also advertised to railroads in publications such as Fortune, and The Wall Street Journal in large, full-page ads pushing the monetary and efficiency benefits.

By the mid to late 1960s, railroads in North America began searching for a system that would allow them to automatically identify railcars and other rolling stock. Through the efforts of the Association of American Railroads (AAR), a number of companies developed automatic equipment identification (AEI) systems. The AAR selected four systems for extensive field tests:

- General Electric - a RFID system
- ABEX - a microwave system
- Wabco - a black-and-white barcode system
- GTE Sylvania - KarTrak, a color barcode system

All those systems, except the RFID system, had labels that were mounted on each side of the railcar, and a trackside scanner.

Following disagreements with Sylvania regarding the future potential of KarTrak, David Collins departed in 1968 to form his own company to continue research and development into scanners and barcodes.

=== Implementation ===
After the initial field tests, the ABEX, Wabco, and GTE KarTrak ACI systems were selected for a head-to-head accuracy test on the Pennsylvania Railroad, at Spruce Creek, Pennsylvania. The KarTrak system was declared the winner and selected by the AAR as the standard.

Starting in 1967, all railcar owners were required by the AAR to install ACI labels on their cars. By 1970, roughly 86% of the 2 million railroad freight cars were carrying an ACI plate, with some railroads having completed labeling of their freight cars. Twelve railroads had completed installation of approximately 50 ACI trackside scanners.

In 1972, GTE Sylvania decided to exit the railcar tracking field, and sold KarTrak to Servo Corporation of America.

By 1975, 90% of all railcars were labeled. The read rate was about 80%, which means that after seven years of service, 10% of the labels had failed for reasons such as physical damage and dirt accumulation. The dirt accumulation was most evident on flatcars that had low-mounted labels.

=== Demise ===
The AAR had recognized from their field tests that periodic inspection and label maintenance would be requirements to maintain a high level of label readability. Regulations were instituted for label inspection and repair whenever a railcar was in the repair shop, which on average happened every two years. The maintenance program never gained sufficient compliance. Without maintenance, the read rate failed to improve, and the KarTrak system was abandoned by 1977.

Even towards the end of and after the demise of KarTrak, development of improvements based on the system did continue, with three patents being issued in 1976, 1977 and 1982 that were based on the KarTrak technology, one for a variable label that could signal an issue with car, like a refrigerator car that was too warm, a self cleaning ACI label, and a three-dimensional "optical target" as another attempt to eliminate the known issue with dirty labels.

In November 1977, the Association of American Railroads released a short white paper that flagged several problems with KarTrak: Frequent inaccuracies in data, ACI labels reaching the end of their life span and requiring replacement, and lack of universal adoption within the railroad industry. A weighted ballot would be conducted of all interchange railroads, weighted based on ownership of railcars, to if the ACI requirements would be eliminated. The result of this ballot was to eliminate the requirement to install ACI labels. The decision was overwhelming, with a 5 to 1 margin. Despite claiming in their white paper that the dissatisfaction with ACI "would not mean the railroad industry was taking a step backward in car utilization, or operating efficiency or in the adoption of modern technology." of this failure, the railroad industry did not seriously search for another system to identify railcars until the mid-1980s.

== Design ==
=== Tags and label design ===
A diagram of a complete KarTrak ACI barcode plate, as would be mounted on a rail car.

Examples of the various KarTrak labels used to form a barcode.

KarTrak ACI tags consisted of a plate with 13 horizontal labels put in a vertical arrangement that are also understood as data lines, which could have 13 different forms. These labels, or symbols, stand for the single digits 0–9, the number 10 as an extra feature for the checksum line, and the "START" and "STOP" labels that gave reference to the vertical line position of the tag. Modern depictions of the labels often name the upper color first and then the lower color.

In practice people found that there were a significant number of cases where the label set was not done correctly or a label was applied incorrectly, such as being rotated by 180°. (The blue stripes of START and STOP labels should to point to the left, such that the blue stripe is oriented toward the center of the label set.) In particular, the STOP labels appeared to be the subject of such errors, leading to decoding errors and the need for decoder workarounds in the field that effectively weakened the system. Even some early advertising materials exposed such flaws.

Values of label stripes
	Upper Stripe			
Lower Stripe	blue	white	red	black
blue	9	0	10 / center of STOP	5 / left STOP
white	6	1	2	8
red	center of START	7	4	3 / right START
black	/ left START	-	/ right STOP	-

- = not used / reserved
white = white/black checker pattern aka checkered

The labels, also understood as data lines, each had two horizontal stripes that together represented a single symbol of information. The colors used for the stripes were blue, white, red and black. This produces 16 possible combinations, though only 12 were used in the center area (by excluding black for the lower color). For sensing reasons the white color was dimmed down by a black checkerboard so that its light intensity was similar to red and blue stripes that were sensed via a color filters.

Sensor colors and detection truth table
Sensor	blue	white	red	black
for red	0	1	1	0
for blue	1	1	0	0

The labels each are 5 3/4 inches (15 cm) wide and 1 inch (2.5 cm) high. With a 3/8 inch (0.95 cm) vertical gap between the labels realized a total height of 17.5 inches (44 cm). Labels could be affixed directly to the car side, but usually were applied to dark plates, which were then riveted to each side of the car.

The labels were made from retroreflective plastic sheet that was coated with red or blue filters. The retroreflective material gave a clear optical signal that could be read from a 9-to-12-foot (2.7 to 3.7 m) distance and easily distinguished from the other markings on the railcar. The white areas provided both a red and blue optical response to the reader, and were patterned with dots so that their brightness would be about the same as a red or blue stripe.

The start and stop labels were partially filled, so that the reader scanning beam would be centered on them before they were recognized. This ensured that the entire label was centered and had the best chance of being read accurately.

=== Data contained in label lines ===
The labels are to be read from bottom to top:

- Line 13: check digit.
- Line 12: stop label.
- Lines 6 to 11: car number.
- Lines 2 to 5: equipment/owner code.
  - Line 2: equipment code
  - Lines 3 to 5: ownership code
- Line 1: start label.

The first digit of the equipment owner (line 2) marks the type of equipment: 0 for railroad-owned, 1 for privately owned, or 6 for non-revenue equipment.

The car number is left-padded with zeroes if necessary. For locomotives, line 6 is the type of unit and line 7 the suffix number.

The check digit is calculated as follows: Each number digit is multiplied by two to the power of the label's position minus two. Thus, the first digit (line 2) is multiplied by 1, the second by 2, the third by 4, the fourth by 8 and so on, until the 10th, which is multiplied by 512. The sum of all these numbers modulo 11 is the check digit.

The code on the caboose in the picture at top can be decoded as Start 8350199918 Stop 5. This means a car with equipment code number 8, ownership code 350, which lists this as a car of the Illinois Central Railroad, car number 199918, with a check digit of 5.

=== Label placement ===
Labels were placed on both sides of all railroad equipment, including locomotives, passenger cars, and cabooses. Labels were required to be unobstructed, and were not allowed to have anything such as ladders, railings, grab iron between them and the scanner. For curved surfaces of tank cars, an oversized ACI label was available, known as an "extended-range panel'"The retroreflective stripes on these panels were 3.5 inches (89 mm) taller than standard stripes.

=== Trackside scanners ===
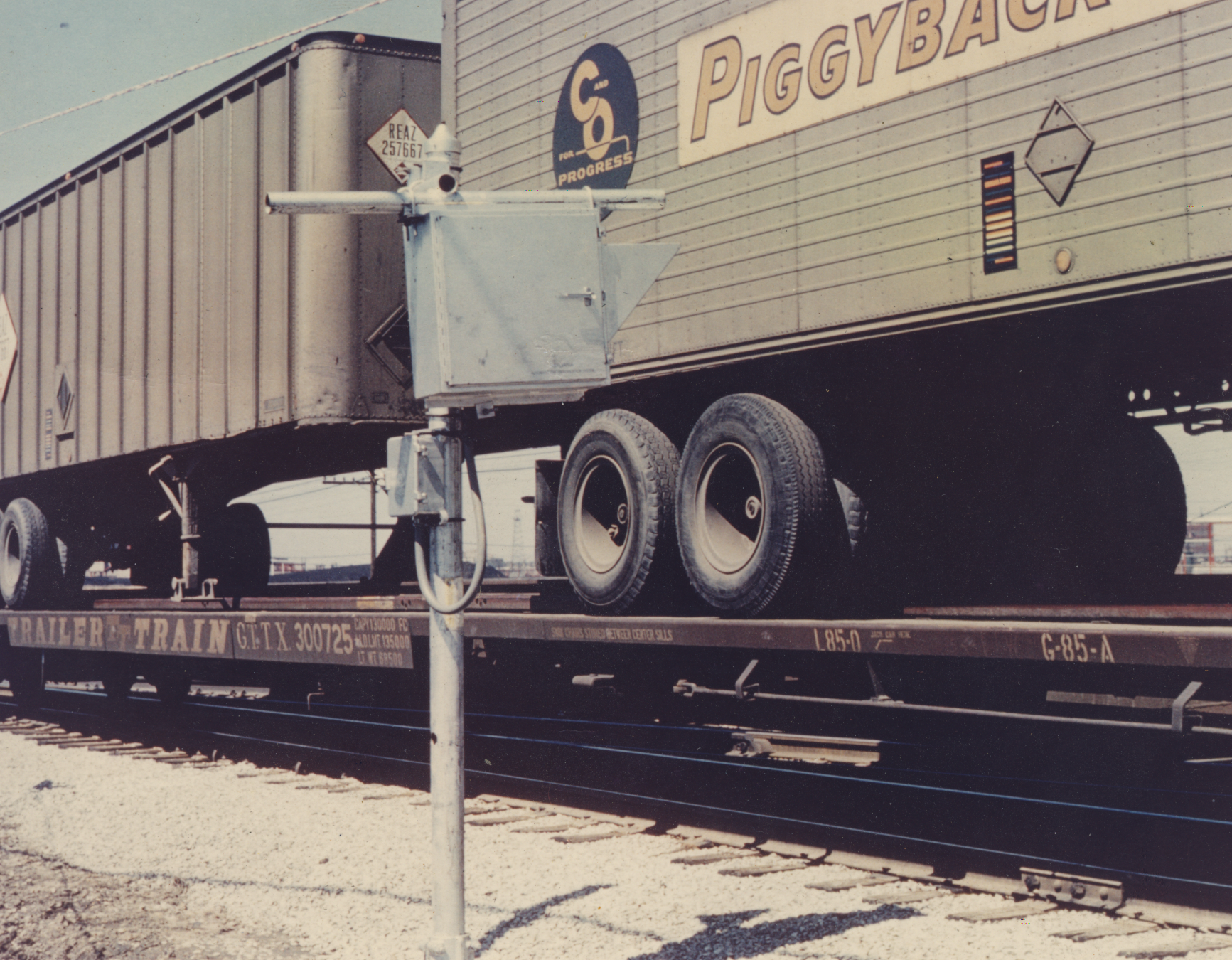
A KarTrak scanner in Midland, Michigan.

The readers were optical scanners, somewhat like the barcode scanners used for retail store barcode items today. The scanning distances and speeds meant that the processing electronics needed to be state-of-the-art for its day. They were placed along the rail lines, often at the entrance and exit of a switchyard and at major junctions, spaced back from the tracks so that the labels would pass in the reading zone, 9 to 12 feet (2.7 to 3.7 m) from the scanner and with the scanner aperture at 9 feet 6 inches (2.90 m) above the railhead.

The scanners were housed in metal boxes typically about the size of a mini-refrigerator, 24 by 24 by 12 inches (610 by 610 by 300 mm). They consisted of a collimated 100-200 watt xenon arc light source arranged coaxially with red and blue sensing photo tubes. The coaxial optical arrangement provided optimum sensing of the retroreflective labels. This light source and sensing beam was directed to a large (8–14 in or 20–36 cm) mirrored rotating wheel that provided the vertical scanning of the railcar. The movement of the train provided the horizontal scanning. Although the system could capture labels at 60 miles per hour (97 km/h), often the speeds were much lower.

The scanner's analog video signals were passed to a nearby rail equipment hut where the processing and computing electronics were located. The first systems were discrete circuits and logic and only provided an ASCII-coded list of the labels that passed the scanner. These were forwarded to the rail operators for manual tracking or integration with their computer systems. Later reading systems were coupled with era minicomputers (Digital Equipment Corporation PDP-8s), and more elaborate tracking and weighing systems were integrated. Sometimes these included many railyard input sensors, for rail switch position, car passage, and hot wheel bearing sensors. Some of the more productive and thus longer-lived systems were installed in captive rail applications that carried bulk goods from mines to smelter, where the weight of individual cars loaded and unloaded tracked the bulk inventory.

== Legacy ==
The KarTrak system proved to need too much maintenance to be practical. Up to 20% of the cars were not read correctly. Further, ACI did not have any centralized system or network, even within railroad companies. The information collected from wayside scanners was printed out with little means of searching for information beyond going through piles of paperwork. Clerical personnel became frustrated by the increasing error rate. These issues led to the abandonment by the ARR who discontinued the requirement for rail cars to have KarTrak labels. Between 1967 and 1977, the railroad industry spent $150 million on KarTrak, and up to 95% of cars were barcoded.

Railroad cars that were in service prior to 1977 continued to carry KarTrak labels, with labels being still observed on freight cars into the 2000s. These labels have vanished in time due to a combination of repainting, major overhaul, and the retirement of cars, particularly due to the AAR Rule 88 and 90, which restrict use of rail cars built prior to July 1, 1974, to a 40-year life, which ran out for most cars in the mid-2010s. Cars built on and after 1 July 1974 are subject to a 50-year life, with mandatory retirements to start in 2024.

Versions of KarTrak technology were trialed in other fields. In the late 1960s, the New Jersey Turnpike explored the system as an attempt at open road tolling, combining it with vehicle identification. A computer calculated the toll due and a bill was sent to the driver. Like the original version of KarTrak, vehicles were fitted with a label approximately 3 by 7 inches (76 by 178 mm) that were scanned by a camera at toll booths.

In 1984, Computer Identics Corporation, Collins' company following his departure from GTE Sylvania, sued Southern Pacific Transportation, along with three other companies, alleging they had acted in a conspiracy to intentionally undermine KarTrak in favor of a system Southern Pacific had been working on called TOPS. The lawsuit was ultimately unsuccessful, with the jury finding no evidence of a conspiracy, which was then upheld on appeal.
