= Havells Sylvania =

International lighting product company

Sylvania Lighting (formerly Feilo Sylvania), Havells-Sylvania, and SLI (Sylvania Lighting International), is an international designer and manufacturer of lighting products, trading as Sylvania. It has plants throughout Europe, Asia, North Africa and Central and South America, and is one of the few lighting companies that produces both lamps and lighting fixtures. It is owned by Shanghai Feilo Acoustics Ltd., having previously been owned by the Indian electrical company Havells.

== History ==
=== 1900s ===
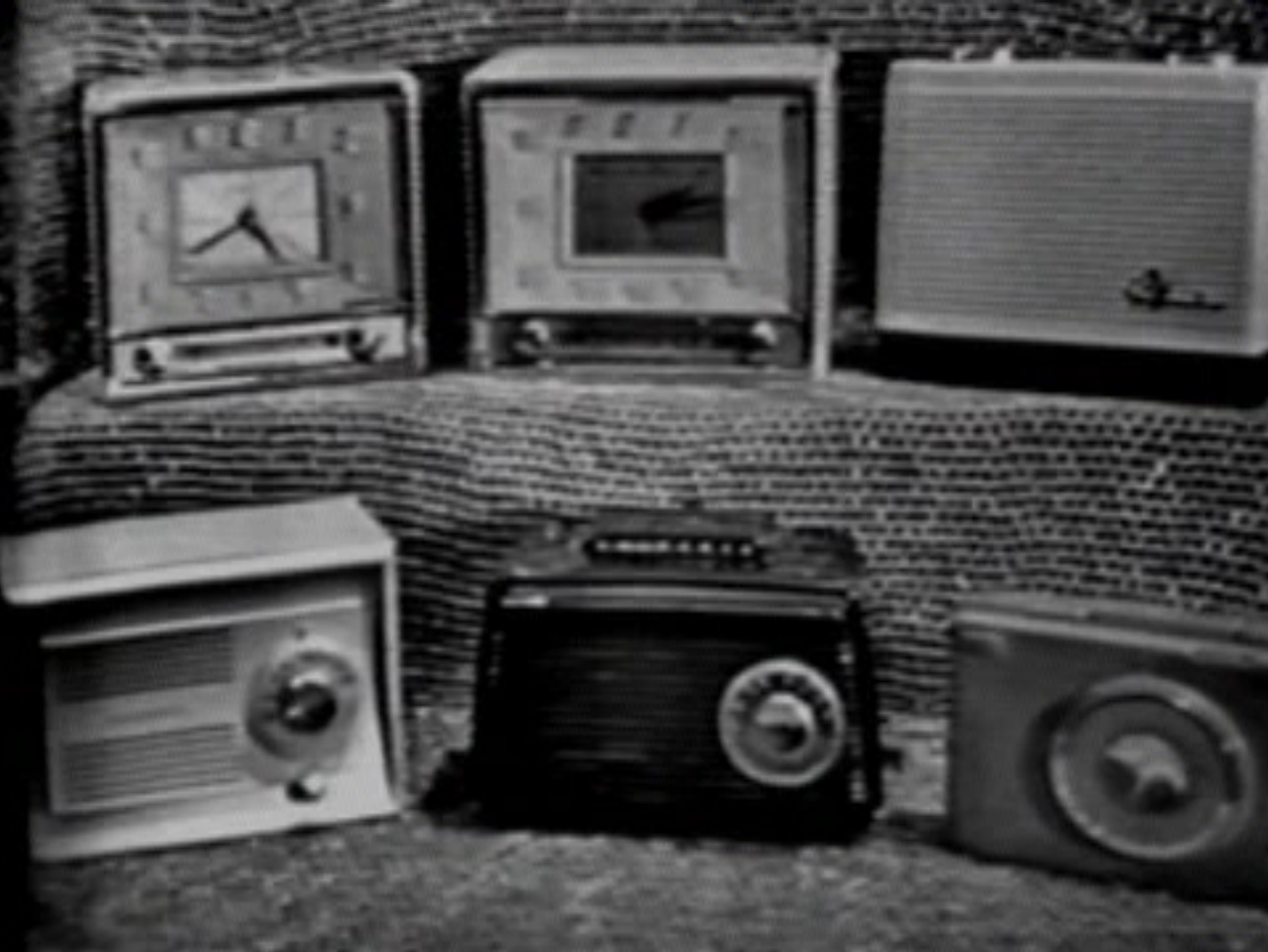
A range of radios from the 1950s

Founded in the early 1900s as a business that renewed burned-out light bulbs, Sylvania and its predecessor companies ultimately began producing new lamps and then vacuum tubes for the fledgling radio industry. By the time Sylvania Electric Products merged with General Telephone in 1959, Sylvania had become a manufacturer of electronics, lighting, television, radio and chemistry and metallurgy. The merged corporation was renamed GT&E Corporation. Sylvania operated as a separate entity and produced cameras, photo flash bulbs, general lighting and TVs and anti missile defense systems. GTE sold its consumer electronics business to North American Philips in 1981.

=== 1993 ===
During the early 1990s it was clear that GTE must make substantial investments into the emerging mobile telecommunications field, which was beginning to compete against its core business in traditional telephone systems. The decision was made to sell off Sylvania to finance these new investments. At this time the global lamps market was dominated by only four players – Sylvania, GE, Philips and Osram, each of whom had roughly a quarter of the market. International monopoly regulations prohibited an outright takeover of the entire of Sylvania by one of these three competitors. Eventually, a deal was struck in which the company was split into two parts. Osram GmbH, obtained the North America, Mexico and Puerto Rican operations and rights to the Sylvania brand in those territories. The remainder of the company in Europe, Asia and Latin America, together with the Sylvania brand in those countries, was the subject of a management buyout which led to the formation of SLI Holdings International LLC. Eventually, The Australia and New Zealand subsidiaries became independent entities. SLI meant Sylvania Lighting International.

=== 2007 to 2016 ===
In April 2007, SLI was acquired by Havells India Ltd. at a transaction price of €227.5 million, forming Havells Sylvania. This newly formed entity has 91 branches and representative offices and 8,000 staff in more than 50 countries.

=== 2016 to present ===
In January 2016 Havells Sylvania was acquired by Shanghai Feilo Acoustics Co. Ltd. and formed Feilo Sylvania, of which the latter owns 80%. Havells still owns a 20% stake.

== Breakthrough Products ==
- 1959 — Dichroic Lamp

Invented together with Bausch & Lomb, this was the world's first light source to feature a cool-beam reflector coating which directs light forwards while allowing heat to escape out of the rear of the lamp.

- 1964 — Deluxe Mercury Lamp

Following Sylvania's invention of the red-emitting phosphor for colour television screens, a spinoff application created the modern deluxe colour mercury lamp.

- 1966 — MetalArc

Invention of the sodium-scandium lamp chemistry which continues to set the standard for metal halide lighting all over the world.

- 1968 — The Flashcube

Invention of The Flashcube allowed still cameras to take four images in succession. It had four electrically fired flash bulbs with an integral reflector in a compact cube-shaped arrangement.

- 1986 — MR16 Halogen

Tru-Aim Professional — The world's first MR16 lamp to feature a sealed front lens and UV protection.

- 1987 — TwinArc HPS

A high intensity discharge lamp (HID) which features dual arc tubes for immediate re-ignition, and lamp life of 55,000 hours.

- 1989 — MiniLynx

Invention of the first Integrated Circuit ballast for a compact fluorescent lamp – the development responsible for dramatically reducing the size of modern CFL lamps.

- 1990 — HiSpot Halogen

The first high voltage halogen lamps which permitted a higher performance upgrade over traditional incandescent reflector lamps.

- 1995 — Mercury-Free HPS

Invention of the world's first mercury-free HID lamp.

- 1996 — HiSpot ES50

Invention of the GU10 lamp cap and compact mains voltage halogen lamp, offering transformer-free operation.

- 2000 — MicroLynx F

An ultra-compact, unconventional lamp of extremely flat dimensions.

- 2003 — BriteSpot ES50

Invention of the world's first compact metal halide lamp in the popular MR16 format, as an energy efficient alternative to the halogen MR16 lamp for commercial lighting.

- 2007 — MiniLynx Fast Start

Introduction of the first compact fluorescent lamps to feature almost instant light at switch-on without reducing lamp lifetime.

- 2008 — HiSpot ECO

The first high efficacy mains voltage halogen reflector lamp, whose 30% energy savings allow the 50W GU10 lamp to be replaced by an efficient 35W alternative with no loss of light.

- 2011 — RefLED ES50 350lm

The world's first LED based retrofit designed to match the performance and size constraints of the popular GU10 50W tungsten halogen lamp, matching the 350-lumen output of the 50W halogen lamp. The lamps are produced at the first LED lamp manufacturing facility in Europe; earlier facilities have been in Asia. The Sylvania RefLED GU10 lamps are manufactured at the plant in Tienen, Belgium, where the world's first GU10 halogen lamp was invented in 1996.

== Locations ==
=== Manufacturing ===
- Manufacturing might be in China (example Belgium has only small office)
- The company has established competency centers at the following locations:
- Tienen, Belgium — Halogen, Discharge, LED and Special Lamps
- Erlangen, Germany — Linear Fluorescent Lamps
- Neemrana, India — Compact Fluorescent Lamps
- Newhaven, UK — Professional Luminaires
- Saint-Etienne, France — Industrial Luminaires

In addition, a number of satellite factories serve other global regions:

- Kairouan, Tunisia — Incandescent, Halogen & CFL assembly
- Costa Rica — Fluorescent Starters & Glowbottles
- Bogota, Colombia — Incandescent & Linear Fluorescent Lamps
- Vinhedo, Brazil — Incandescent & Sodium Lamps, Glass tubing & bulbs

=== Distribution ===
- Paris, France
- Atlanta GA, USA

== Notable projects ==
- Paris Metro — Paris, France
- Tate Modern Museum — London, United Kingdom
- Liverpool Retail Chain — Mexico
- Fullerton Hotel — Singapore
- Barbican Centre — London, United Kingdom
- Dublin Airport — Dublin, Ireland
- Kelvin Grove Gallery — London, United Kingdom
- Manchester City Art Gallery — Manchester, United Kingdom
- MJU Restaurant & Lounge, The Millennium Knightsbridge Hotel — London, United Kingdom
- Bloomsbury Fitness Centre, University College — London, United Kingdom
- University of Cambridge, Judge Business School — Cambridge, United Kingdom
- Zorlu Center - Istanbul, Turkey

== See also ==
- Sylvania Electric Products
- Havells
