= Sylvania Electric Products explosion =

1956 thorium explosion in New York City

- Date: July 2, 1956
- Time: 8:40 am (Eastern Time Zone)
- Venue: Sylvania Electric Products Metallurgical Laboratory, 208-01 Willets Point Boulevard
- Location: Bay Terrace Queens, New York City; 40°47′14″N 73°47′13.3″W
- Type: Three explosions
- Cause: incineration of thorium metal slugs.
- Deaths: 1 (thorium poisoning)
- Injuries: 9
- Litigation: Blaber v. United States, 212 F. Supp. 95 (E.D.N.Y. 1962)

On the morning of July 2, 1956, three explosions involving scrap thorium occurred at the Sylvania Electric Products' Metallurgical Laboratory in Bayside, (now Bay Terrace) Queens, New York. Nine people were injured, some severely. One 28-year-old employee, Oliver Blaber, died on August 6, 1956. Workers described three fireballs.

Sylvania was experimenting with large-scale production of thorium metal from thorium dioxide. Part of the process of shutting down this experiment was the reprocessing and burning of thorium metal powder sludges that went unprocessed during the experiment. It was during the incineration of this material that the explosion occurred. At the time thorium's pyrophoric properties were not well understood.

The plant's medical director stated to the press at the time that the employee who died as a result, Oliver Blaber, had succumbed to "complications caused by third-degree burns". Blaber's son would later cite the death certificate, which listed "thorium poisoning". Victims of the explosions were treated at Flushing Hospital, where both Blaber's mother and wife worked. Blaber died a month after the incident, on August 6, 1956.

Three hundred people – 225 employees, 50 firefighters, and 25 police officers – were tested for radioactive contamination. The role of radiation was downplayed, especially to assuage fears that a nuclear explosion had occurred. The debris from the explosion was ultimately disposed of in the ocean.
