= Sylvania Electric Products =

American electronics manufacturer

Sylvania Electric Products Inc.
- Formerly: Hygrade Lamp Co. (1917-1931); Hygrade Sylvania Corporation (1931–1942)
- Type: Private until 1928; Public until 1959; Subsidiary until ?
- Industry: Electronics
- Predecessors: NILCO; Sylvania Products Co.; Hygrade Lamp Company
- Founded: September 19, 1917; 108 years ago
- Fate: Merged with General Telephone in 1959
- Successors: General Telephone and Electronics (GTE); Osram Sylvania; Ledvance

Sylvania Electric Products Inc. was an East Coast American manufacturer of electrical and electronic equipment, including at various times incandescent light bulbs, vacuum tubes, fluorescent lamps, radio transmitters and receivers, customer-specified devices, cathode ray tubes and television sets, semiconductors and integrated circuits, and mainframe computers such as MOBIDIC. They were one of the companies involved in the development of the COBOL programming language.

The company was an innovator and through its research department obtained hundreds of patents. Among the innovations was the first commercially relevant line of TTL logic integrated circuits.

The company history can be traced back to 1901, when Frank A. Poor, a merchant in agriculture products from Salem, Massachusetts, partnered up to start a small business refilling burned-out light bulbs.

== History ==
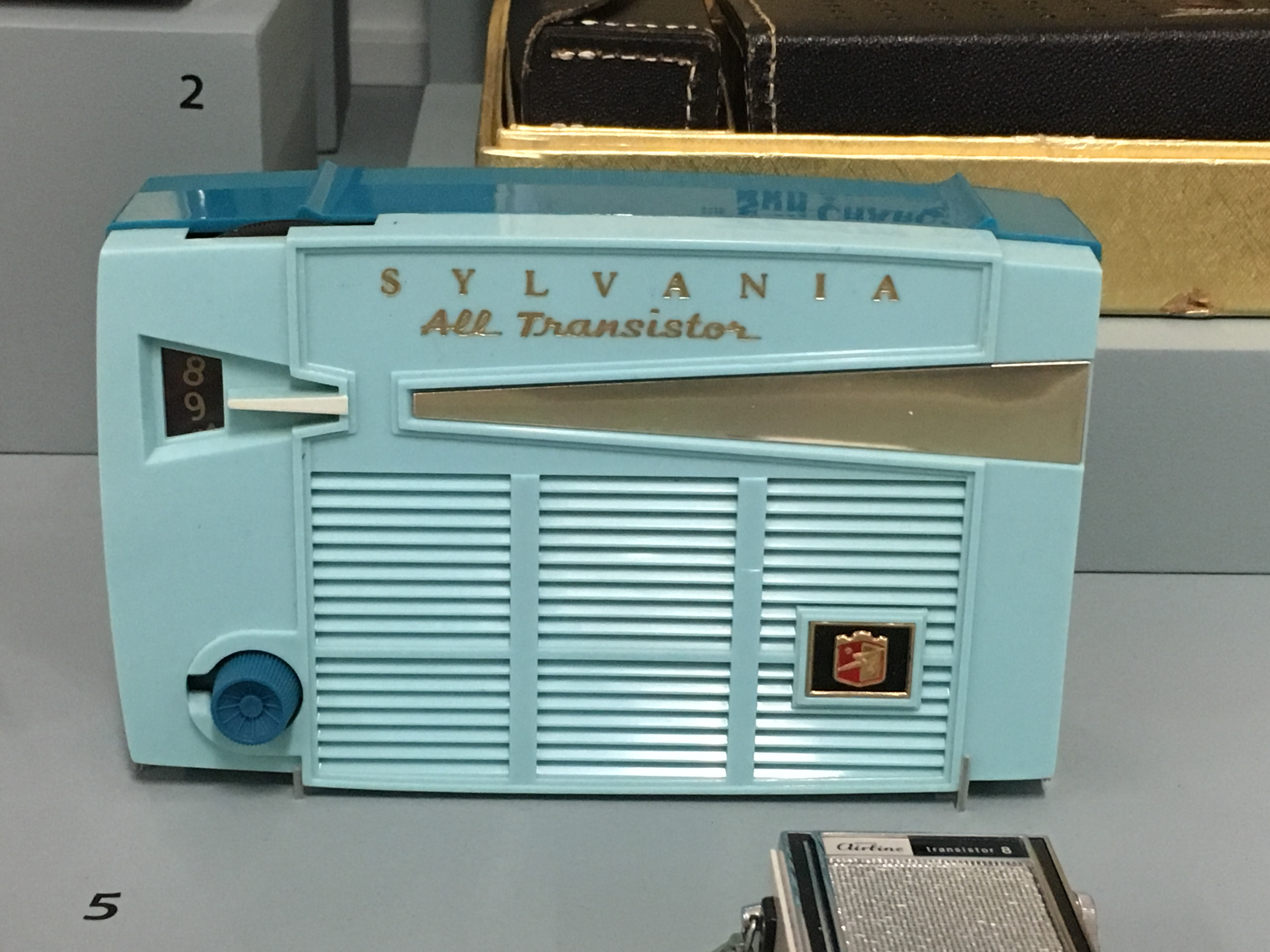
Sylvania Model 4P14 (1961) radio, made of plastic

Sylvania was a major manufacturer of vacuum tubes until the early 1980s

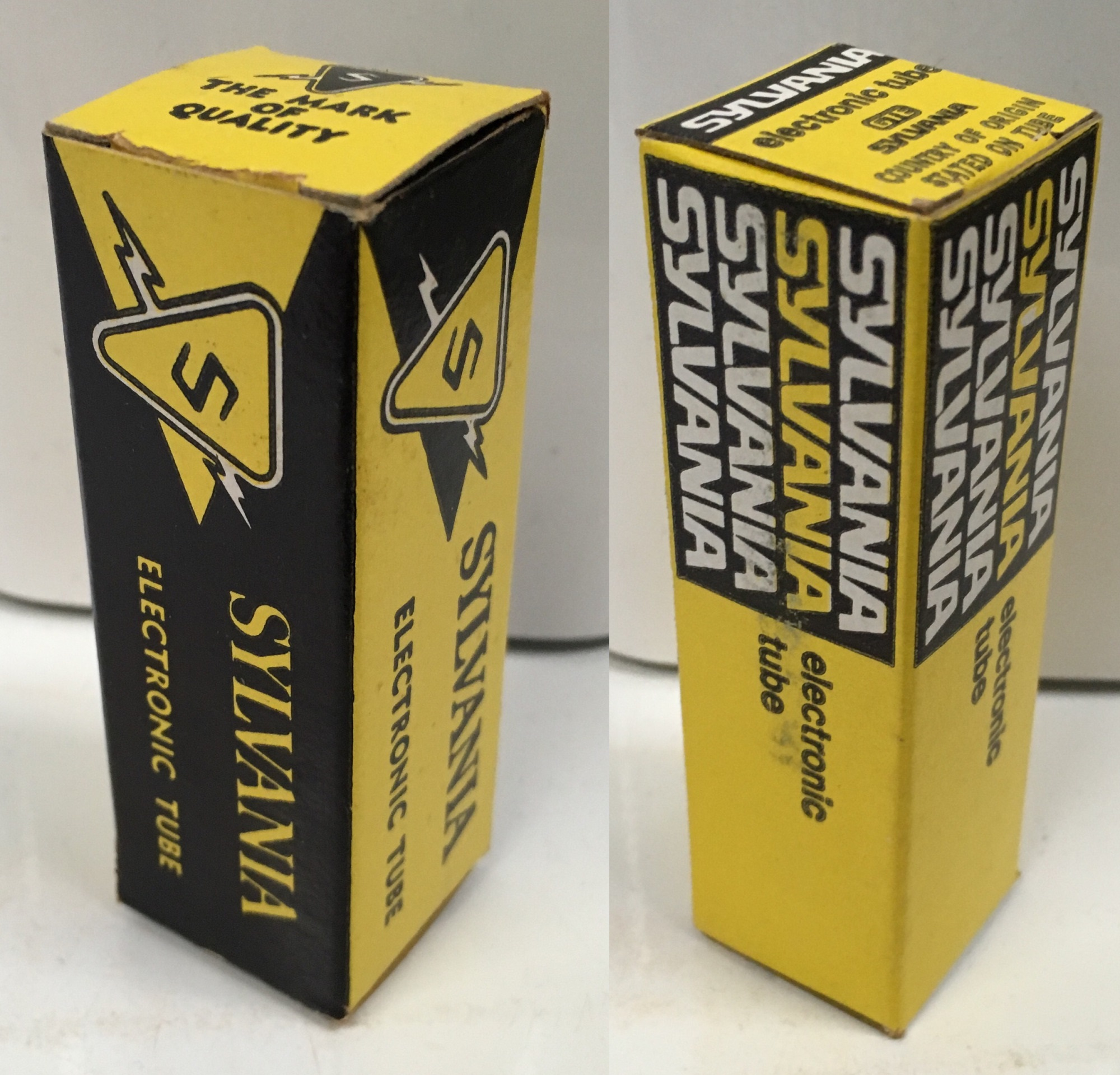
Vacuum tube cartons displaying two generations of Sylvania branding

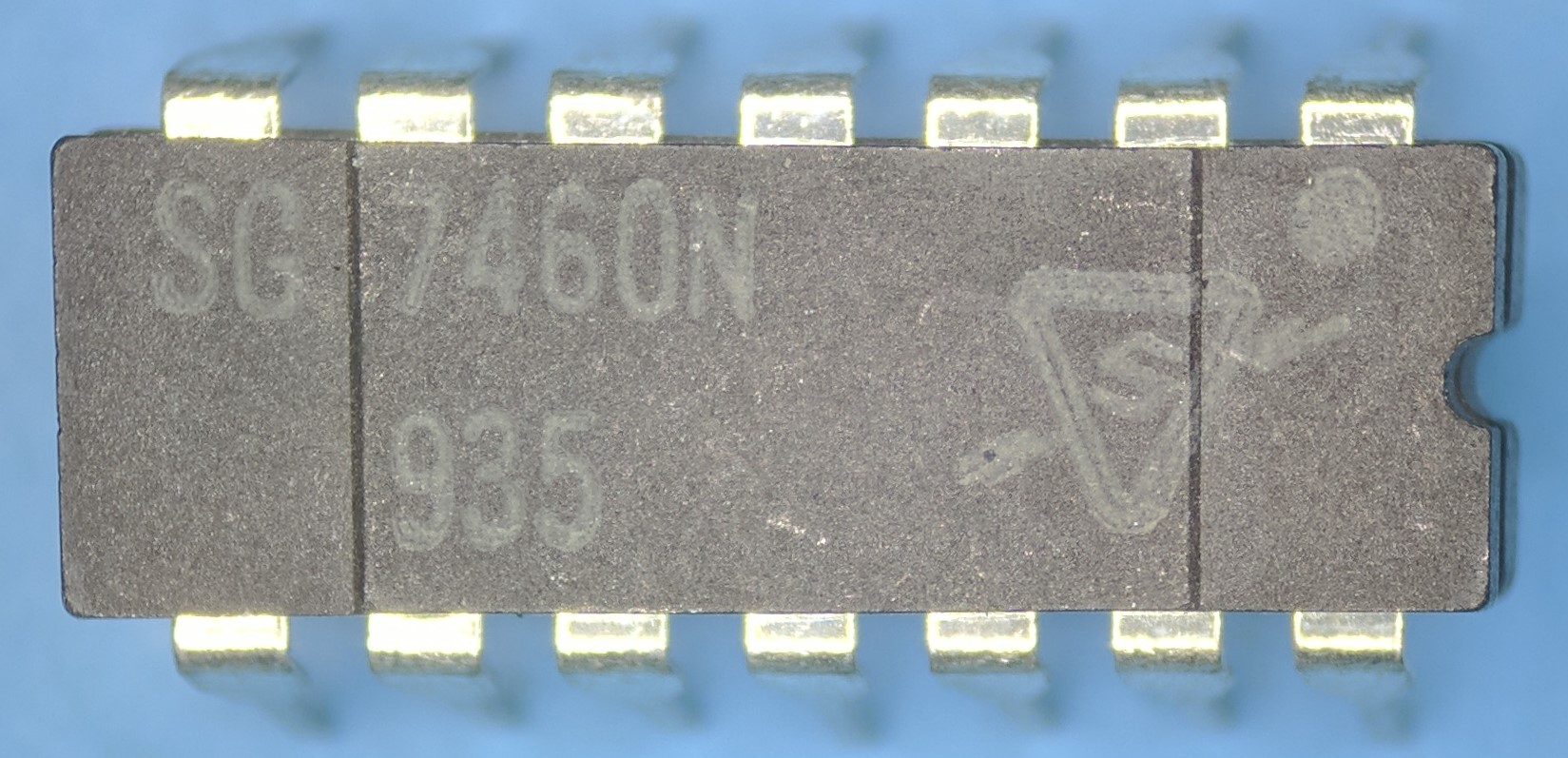
SG7460 (7400 series) integrated circuit manufactured by Sylvania

The Hygrade Sylvania Corporation was formed with the 1931 merger of the Nilco Lamp Works, Inc., Sylvania Products Co. and #Hygrade Lamp Company. (Note: Hygrade Lamp as the surviving company (renamed June 29, 1931) acquired the properties of the others in exchange for 5,500 shares of its convertible preferred and 75,000 of its common stock for a new total of 23,800 preferred and 192,684 common shares) Hygrade and Nilco manufactured incandescent lamps under license from General Electric, Hygrade (since 1928) and Sylvania (since 1924) made vacuum tubes under license from RCA. (Note: Combined revenue in 1930 was $8,340,000. Compared to $137 million annual revenue in 1930 of RCA across all its subsidiaries, and $376 million for General Electric.)

Between June 17, 1933, and October 14, 1933, employment increased from 2,511 to 4,750, weekly payroll from $57,000 to $88,000 in the company's 4 plants (Salem, Emporium, St. Marys, Clifton (Note: The plant in Clifton opened early in 1933 and produced radio transmitters, transmitting tubes, industrial power tubes and custom-built electronic devices. Some devices created in the Clifton electronics division were: a 2-way radio for police patrol cars, to replace 1-way/receive only systems.) with a combined floor space of 9.7 acres / 423,000sqft). The company had a total production capacity for 120,000 lamps and 100,000 tubes per day.

In 1936 a second plant of 91,600sqft was built for $330,000 in Salem on Loring Avenue exclusively for vacuum tube production and absorbed that part of the business from the main Salem plant. Also in 1936 the Economic Lamp Co. of Malden, Massachusetts was acquired. (Note: 12,000 newly issued common shares were paid in exchange) This included a license agreement with General Electric and Hygrade's quota rose from 8.2242% to 9.124% of General Electric's domestic sales of standard (non-miniature) light bulbs. The Malden plant was disposed of some time before 1941.

In 1939, Hygrade Sylvania started preliminary research on fluorescent technology, and later that year, demonstrated the first linear, or tubular, fluorescent lamp. It was featured at the 1939 New York World's Fair. Sylvania acquired multiple fluorescent lamp related licenses from other companies, including for the production of chemicals and In April 1940 began mass production of fluorescent lamp fixtures, formerly handled in Salem, on 70,000sqft leased floor space in Ipswich and within a year extended the lease by an additional 48,000sqft.

Just before the war the company made additional financial transactions. (Note: In 1940 the company offered a new preferred stock in a capital reorganization, (Note: A total of 85,500 par $40 shares of the new 4.5% preferred stock were issued, 52,317.5 reserved for exchange of the remaining 20,927 shares of old $6.50 preferred (2.5 new for each old share). The rest including leftover from stock not so converted was offered at $44 per share on October 16, 1940, proceeds used for general corporate purposes. Any old stock not converted was called for redemption at $110 and interest on January 1, 1941.) apparently the first major influx of outside/cash capital since before 1928 and the first of many to follow. On September 16, 1941, the common stock was split 2-for-1 (Note: Shareholders voted on September 16, 1941, to increase authorized capital from 340,000 to 680,000 shares and to add 60,000 on top for a new total of 740,000. The outstanding shares were doubled to 414,368.) and 100,000 new shares were issued at $19.375 for working capital. On August 12, 1942, the company changed its name to Sylvania Electric Products Inc on the occasion of the listing of its common stock on the New York Stock Exchange.)

During World War II, Sylvania was chosen from among several competing companies to manufacture the miniature vacuum tubes used in proximity fuze shells due to its quality standards and mass production capabilities. The new fluorescent lamp plant in Danvers (Note: Ground for the $500,000 building was broken in May 1941.) was working overtime to meet the demand of factories now run on a 24-hour basis. In 1942 and 1943 the company made further financial transactions. (Note: On June 3, 1942, $4 million in 3.25% 15-year bonds were sold to finance expansions and provide working capital. (Note: $4,000,000 3.25% bonds dated June 1, 1942, and due June 1, 1957. Was used to repay $2,075,000 bank loans (of which $986,000 were used for plant expansions) and the remainder for working capital.) The 4.5% preferred was called for redemption on June 5, 1943. (Note: Conversion privileges were exercised for 175,106 common shares (more than 99% of the 83,717 preferred shares outstanding were converted)) Together with a sale of 165,000 shares to the public ($4,290,000 at $26 per share) this increased the common stock from 514,368 to 854,474 shares during May-June 1943.) Sylvania announced on August 2, 1943, the acquisition of its fifteenth manufacturing plant, a former motor sales and repair shop in Warren, Pennsylvania which was converted to produce assembly parts for lamps and tubes. About 85% of Sylvania's production in 1943 was for the war effort and production was expanding further in 1944 amidst a leveling off throughout the industry in general. In May 1944 Sylvania acquired the Colonial Radio Corp as a wholly owned subsidiary, a producer of radio receivers. (Note: Sylvania paid $3,250,000 for Colonial Radio and at the same time raised an additional $2,850,000 with a common stock sale. (Note: Sylvania acquired all 64,000 shares of class A, all 256,000 shares of class B and at least 42,399 of the 42,715 class C common shares of Colonial at $8.96 per share. Part of the payment was with 50,526 Sylvania common shares, part was in cash. Together with the 100,000 shares sold at $28.50 per share to the public this brought the number of common shares outstanding from 854,474 to 1,000,500. None of the cash raised from the stock sale was used towards the purchase of Colonial.)) Throughout 1944 and the first half of 1945, 85% of Sylvania's and essentially all of Colonial Radio's production was for war. Sylvania became a much more decentralized company during the war. Production capacity was rapidly increased with the opening of feeder plants in small nearby towns, some of which were government owned and sponsored. The main plants tilted more towards the final assembly stages in the supply chain. Since Sylvania was on a path to continue growing, some of the government owned plants were naturally taken over, which required more capital. (Note: The company announced on October 18, 1946, the negotiation of a 5-year 2% $10 million loan agreement in part to purchase the plants. This "$14 million bank loan negotiated in Sep 1946" was rolled over with a June 1948 sale of $15 million 15-year 3.25% private bonds to the Equitable Life Insurance Co. and these "$17,200,000 debentures due 1963" (the only long-term debt at the time) were rolled over into the sale of the $20 million of new $4.40 preferred stock in 1951. The capital market was happy to throw money at the company: the stock issue was quickly oversubscribed.) These were the complete plants built at Williamsport and Brookville and additions to company plants (some old and some only opened during the war) at Ipswich (Note: In 1944 a 5-storey building in Dover, New Hampshire was taken over from the Pacific Mills and functioned as a feeder plant for the Ipswich appliance plant.), Mill Hall, Altoona, Towanda, Warren and Emporium. The government received approximately $3 million in exchange. In 1946, the Loring Avenue plant in Salem was converted to lamp production and its tube business moved to the Pennsylvania cluster.

Sylvania raised $10 million with an October 1945 sale of its new $4 preferred stock and redeemed all of what was left of the 1942 15-year bonds. (Note: 100,000 shares of no-par $4 cumulative preferred were offered to the public at $104 per share to yield for the company $10,119,640. Proceeds to be used to retire all remaining $3,770,000 face amount of 3.25% debentures due June 1, 1957, using $3,864,250 in cash and the rest for expansions to meet estimated demand and for general corporate purposes. The preferred had a sinking fund of 2% of net income not to exceed $50,000 per year and was callable at $106.50 and interest. At the time there were 1,200,000 no-par common shares authorized and 1,005,000 outstanding. The stock was listed on the NYSE.)

In August 1948 RCA became licensee for some 200 patents held by Sylvania, the agreement ran for 7 years at royalties of 0.75% but not exceeding $200,000 per year.

Sylvania in 1948 began to greatly expand its capacity for cathode ray tube production. (Note: fueled by $2.6 million from treasury funds and $4 million from a common stock sale ($4,300,000; 200,000 shares offered at $21.50 on August 5, 1948)) The program was revised at the end of 1948, when the attained capacity of 500,000 CRTs per year was decided to be further tripled. (Note: The program thus grew in scope to an investment of $11 million in total, including $1.2 million for land and buildings, $4 million for machinery and $5 million for working capital, financed with an additional March 22, 1949, offering of 250,000 common shares at $21.875 ($5,468,750; resulting in a total 1,500,000 authorized and 1,456,550 outstanding common shares).) Production began in the Emporium radio tube plant and in the latter part of 1948 new plants in Ottawa, Ohio and Seneca Falls, New York were bought.

Sylvania entered the television field with its September 7, 1949, launch of Sylvania Television branded devices (10-inch, 12.5-inch and 16-inch variants) sold at $199.95 - $449.95 and manufactured in the Colonial Radio Corp plant in Buffalo.

The Sylvania Electric Products explosion, which involved scrap thorium, occurred on July 2, 1956, at their facility in Bayside, Queens, New York City. (Note: Sylvania began building the research center in 1943.) The incident injured nine people; one employee subsequently died of his injuries.

In 1959, Sylvania Electronics merged with General Telephone to form General Telephone and Electronics (GTE) in the largest merger of the decade.

Sylvania developed the earliest flash cubes for still cameras, later selling the technology to Eastman Kodak Company, and later a 10-flash unit called FlipFlash, as well as a line of household electric light bulbs, which continued during GTE's ownership, later sold off to the German manufacturer Osram, and is today marketed as Osram Sylvania.

In June 1964, Sylvania unveiled a color TV picture tube in which europium-bearing phosphor was used for a much brighter, truer red than was possible before.

Through merger and acquisitions, the company became a significant, but never dominating supplier of electrical distribution equipment, including transformers and switchgear, residential and commercial load centers and breakers, pushbuttons, indicator lights, and other hard-wired devices. All were manufactured and distributed under the brand name GTE Sylvania, with the name Challenger used for its light commercial and residential product lines. GTE Sylvania contributed to the technological advancement of electrical distribution products in the late 1970s with several interesting product features. At the time, they were the leading supplier of vacuum cast coil transformers, manufactured in their Hampton, Virginia plant. Their transformers featured aluminum primary windings and were cast using relatively inexpensive molds, allowing them to produce cast coil transformers in a variety of KVA capacities, primary and secondary voltages and physical coil sizes, including low profile coils for mining and other specialty applications. They also developed the first medium voltage 3 phase panel that could survive a dead short across two phases. Their patented design used bus bars encapsulated in a thin coating of epoxy and then bolted together across all three phases, using special non-conductive fittings.

By 1981 GTE had made the decision to exit the electrical distribution equipment market and began selling off its product lines and manufacturing facilities. The Challenger line, mostly manufactured at the time in Jackson, Mississippi, was sold to a former officer of GTE, who used the Challenger name as the name of his new company. Challenger flourished, and was eventually sold to Westinghouse, and later Eaton Corporation. By the mid-1980s, the GTE Sylvania electrical equipment product line and name was no more.

In 1993 GTE exited the lighting business to concentrate on its core telecomms operations. The European, Asian and Latin American operations are now under the ownership of Havells Sylvania. With the acquisition of the North American division by Osram GmbH in January 1993 Osram Sylvania Inc. was established.

== Polling ==
The New York Stock Exchange conducted a polling campaign from 1942-1959 to determine the value of the company.

Common Stock Price Range (Note: 1942 1943 1944 1945 1946 1947 1948 1949 1950 1951 1952 1953 1954 1955 1956 1957 1958 1959)
| | Year | | Jan | Feb | Mar | Apr | May | Jun | Jul | Aug | Sep | Oct | Nov | Dec |
|---|---|---|---|---|---|---|---|---|---|---|---|---|---|---|
| 1942 | 25 1/2 | High | | | | | | | | 17 | 17 1/2 | 19 | 19 5/8 | 25 1/2 |
| 1942 | 15 7/8 | Low | | | | | | | | 15 7/8 | 16 | 17 1/8 | 18 | 19 |
| 1943 | 35 1/2 | High | 26 1/4 | 26 1/8 | 27 | 26 7/8 | 34 | 35 | 35 1/2 | 33 7/8 | 34 5/8 | 31 7/8 | 29 1/2 | 33 1/4 |
| 1943 | 22 5/8 | Low | 23 | 22 5/8 | 23 1/2 | 24 | 26 3/8 | 30 1/4 | 29 1/4 | 29 1/4 | 31 | 28 1/4 | 26 1/4 | 27 1/2 |
| 1944 | 33 1/4 | High | 33 1/4 | 30 3/8 | 31 5/8 | 29 | 29 1/4 | 31 1/4 | 32 3/8 | 30 1/8 | 30 | 29 3/8 | 28 1/2 | 31 5/8 |
| 1944 | 26 3/4 | Low | 29 1/2 | 29 | 27 3/4 | 26 3/4 | 27 1/4 | 27 1/2 | 28 1/2 | 28 1/4 | 27 1/2 | 27 | 27 | 27 1/2 |
| 1945 | 43 1/2 | High | 32 5/8 | 32 3/8 | 32 3/8 | 33 1/2 | 35 1/4 | 34 1/2 | 33 | 36 1/8 | 37 1/2 | 39 | 43 1/2 | 43 1/2 |
| 1945 | 29 | Low | 30 1/8 | 31 3/8 | 29 5/8 | 29 | 32 | 31 1/4 | 30 | 30 5/8 | 34 1/4 | 36 1/8 | 37 1/2 | 39 |
| 1946 | 41 | High | 41 | 40 1/4 | 39 7/8 | 40 | 37 1/4 | 34 1/2 | 33 3/4 | 33 3/8 | 29 3/4 | 27 1/4 | 23 1/2 | 25 |
| 1946 | 19 1/4 | Low | 37 1/2 | 36 1/4 | 34 1/2 | 35 3/4 | 33 1/4 | 31 | 28 3/4 | 29 1/2 | 23 1/8 | 21 1/8 | 19 1/4 | 20 1/2 |
| 1947 | 28 1/2 | High | 27 1/2 | 28 1/2 | 28 1/4 | 26 1/4 | 24 1/4 | 23 1/2 | 24 1/2 | 23 5/8 | 23 | 23 5/8 | 22 3/8 | 21 |
| 1947 | 18 3/4 | Low | 22 3/4 | 26 1/4 | 25 1/4 | 21 1/2 | 20 5/8 | 21 | 22 | 22 1/8 | 21 1/4 | 20 3/4 | 20 1/4 | 18 3/4 |
| 1948 | 26 | High | 21 | 20 | 20 1/2 | 22 1/2 | 25 5/8 | 26 | 23 7/8 | 22 | 22 5/8 | 24 1/4 | 24 | 24 5/8 |
| 1948 | 17 1/8 | Low | 19 1/4 | 17 1/8 | 17 3/4 | 19 1/2 | 21 3/8 | 22 5/8 | 21 | 21 | 20 5/8 | 21 1/8 | 20 1/8 | 21 5/8 |
| 1949 | 24 1/2 | High | 24 1/2 | 21 7/8 | 22 3/4 | 22 1/4 | 22 | 20 1/4 | 19 1/3 | 18 3/4 | 19 1/8 | 19 7/8 | 19 1/8 | 20 3/4 |
| 1949 | 17 1/8 | Low | 21 1/8 | 20 3/8 | 20 7/8 | 21 1/2 | 19 3/4 | 17 1/4 | 17 1/4 | 17 1/8 | 17 1/4 | 17 7/8 | 17 7/8 | 18 1/8 |
| 1950 | 26 5/8 | High | 22 3/4 | 23 7/8 | 23 5/8 | 26 5/8 | 25 1/8 | 24 | 21 | 22 3/8 | 24 | 24 3/4 | 26 | 25 1/4 |
| 1950 | 18 1/4 | Low | 19 3/8 | 21 7/8 | 21 | 22 1/8 | 22 1/2 | 19 1/8 | 18 1/4 | 20 3/8 | 20 3/4 | 22 1/4 | 21 3/4 | 22 |
| 1951 | 39 | High | 29 | 29 3/8 | 30 | 29 3/4 | 29 1/2 | 31 3/8 | 35 3/8 | 35 1/2 | 39 | 38 | 35 3/8 | 36 7/8 |
| 1951 | 23 3/4 | Low | 23 3/4 | 27 5/8 | 27 1/8 | 26 1/4 | 27 1/4 | 28 1/4 | 29 1/2 | 32 1/4 | 33 1/2 | 32 1/2 | 31 1/2 | 35 3/8 |
| 1952 | 41 7/8 | High | 38 3/4 | 38 1/4 | 39 1/8 | 38 5/8 | 34 5/8 | 37 3/8 | 37 1/4 | 36 | 38 | 38 3/4 | 41 1/4 | 41 7/8 |
| 1952 | 32 1/4 | Low | 36 1/8 | 33 3/4 | 34 3/4 | 32 3/4 | 32 1/4 | 33 1/2 | 34 1/4 | 34 1/4 | 34 3/4 | 36 7/8 | 37 1/4 | 38 1/8 |
| 1953 | 40 | High | 40 | 37 1/4 | 36 5/8 | 36 | 36 1/4 | 34 1/2 | 33 5/8 | 34 1/2 | 32 1/2 | 35 3/4 | 36 1/4 | 33 |
| 1953 | 29 1/4 | Low | 37 | 36 | 34 3/8 | 33 5/8 | 33 7/8 | 31 | 32 | 30 5/8 | 29 1/4 | 30 1/4 | 30 5/8 | 31 1/8 |
| 1954 | 48 7/8 | High | 34 | 34 3/4 | 36 7/8 | 35 1/2 | 36 3/8 | 37 1/8 | 40 3/8 | 38 3/8 | 38 5/8 | 40 3/8 | 48 3/8 | 48 7/8 |
| 1954 | 31 7/8 | Low | 31 7/8 | 33 1/8 | 34 | 33 3/4 | 34 3/8 | 34 | 36 1/2 | 35 7/8 | 36 | 36 | 38 7/8 | 44 1/4 |
| 1955 | 49 7/8 | High | 47 1/4 | 47 3/8 | 47 1/4 | 46 | 48 3/8 | 49 7/8 | 49 | 46 3/8 | 48 1/2 | 45 1/4 | 46 3/8 | 46 1/4 |
| 1955 | 41 | Low | 42 1/8 | 42 3/4 | 41 | 43 1/8 | 43 5/8 | 47 1/8 | 45 1/2 | 43 1/2 | 42 1/4 | 42 1/8 | 43 5/8 | 44 |
| 1956 | 55 7/8 | High | 46 5/8 | 48 1/2 | 52 1/4 | 54 3/4 | 55 7/8 | 52 1/8 | 53 | 55 3/4 | 52 3/8 | 50 7/8 | 50 | 47 7/8 |
| 1956 | 42 | Low | 42 3/4 | 42 | 47 1/8 | 49 1/8 | 47 3/4 | 47 | 51 1/8 | 51 1/2 | 47 1/4 | 46 1/8 | 46 1/4 | 43 1/2 |
| 1957 | 46 1/4 | High | 46 1/4 | 41 7/8 | 42 | 44 7/8 | 44 1/2 | 42 3/4 | 43 1/2 | 38 3/8 | 37 7/8 | 35 1/4 | 34 7/8 | 34 1/8 |
| 1957 | 29 1/4 | Low | 40 7/8 | 39 5/8 | 40 1/4 | 41 1/4 | 42 | 40 | 39 | 35 | 34 | 30 1/2 | 32 1/2 | 29 1/4 |
| 1958 | 61 1/2 | High | 37 3/8 | 37 1/2 | 36 3/4 | 36 1/2 | 36 3/8 | 36 3/8 | 38 1/2 | 41 5/8 | 45 3/4 | 51 | 57 7/8 | 61 1/2 |
| 1958 | 31 1/2 | Low | 31 1/2 | 34 3/4 | 35 | 34 5/8 | 34 1/2 | 34 3/8 | 35 1/2 | 36 7/8 | 40 5/8 | 43 1/2 | 50 1/8 | 54 1/8 |
| 1959 | 73 1/2 | High | 63 1/2 | 68 | 73 1/2 | | | | | | | | | |
| 1959 | 58 1/4 | Low | 59 | 58 1/4 | 68 3/8 | | | | | | | | | |

== Brand name ==
In 1981, GTE Sylvania sold the rights to the name Sylvania and Philco for use on consumer electronics equipment only, to the Netherlands' NV Philips. Philips wanted the Philco name as the Philco trademark precluded selling products under their own name in the United States. This marked the end of Sylvania's TV production in Batavia, New York, USA, and Smithfield, North Carolina, USA. The Sylvania Smithfield plant later became Channel Master. The rights to the Sylvania name in many countries are held by the U.S. subsidiary of the German company Osram. The Sylvania brand name is owned worldwide, apart from Australia, Canada, Mexico, Thailand, New Zealand, Puerto Rico and the USA, by Havells Sylvania, headquartered in London.

=== Osram Sylvania ===
Osram Sylvania manufactures and markets a wide range of lighting products for homes, business, and vehicles and holds a leading share of the North American lighting market [2]. In fiscal year 2008, the company achieved sales of about 1.75 billion euros, which comprised about 38% of Osram's total sales at the time. Osram's worldwide lighting businesses employed about 9,000 people at the time. In 2016, Osram spun off the general lighting business which included the North American Osram Sylvania unit into an independent company called LEDVANCE headquartered in Garching, Germany. In 2017, LEDVANCE was merged into a consortium of Chinese investment companies and the Chinese lighting manufacturer MLS under the LEDVANCE name. The North American headquarters of LEDVANCE, previously referred to as Osram Sylvania, and located in Danvers, Massachusetts, was relocated to Wilmington, Massachusetts in 2015, a town north of Boston, MA. LEDVANCE continues to use the well known Osram and Sylvania brand names in their corresponding and representative markets throughout the world.

== Advertising ==
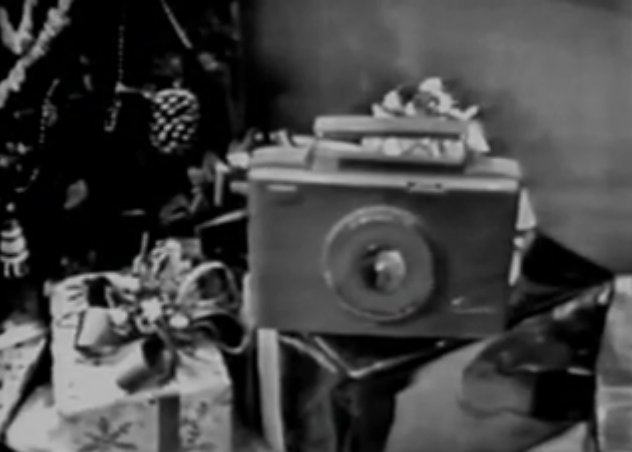
Sylvania Skylark portable radio seen in a television commercial from the 1950s.

- From 1951 until 1956, Sylvania sponsored the game show Beat the Clock. The grand prizes on the show would be Sylvania television sets, and some consolation prizes would be Sylvania radios. Sylvania "Blue Dot for sure shot" flashbulbs would be used to take a photograph of the contestants in awkward outfits or messy stunts.
- One of Sylvania's heavily advertised TV features was a lighted perimeter mask of adjustable brightness called "HALOLIGHT", which was purported to ease the optical transition if a viewer glanced from a dark background to the bright TV screen. Today Philips markets an Ambilight feature, lighting the wall behind a flat display to soften the viewing experience. HALOLIGHT could not be adapted for color TV, because color TV white balance (aka tracking from low to high brightness) was unpredictable. Since the white color temperature of the HALOLIGHT and the illuminated color screen could not be made equivalent, HALOLIGHT was withdrawn.
- Osram Sylvania sponsored the It's a Small World ride at Disneyland in California with a twelve-year agreement starting in 2009. In 2014, the sponsor logo at the attraction's entrance changed to that of Siemens, the parent company of Sylvania.

== Hygrade Lamp Company ==
The Hygrade Lamp Company (Note: Main source for claims in this section is) was incorporated with a capital of $300,000 in Massachusetts on September 19, 1917 as successor/continuation of the lamp business founded in 1901 by Frank A. Poor (1880-1956). Hygrade manufactured incandescent light bulbs under a license agreement with General Electric Co. which expired on December 11, 1934 (but was then extended with a new agreement). Production grew from

- 3,100,000 in 1917
- 5,600,000 in 1922
- 11,000,000 in 1928 (not including Vosburgh Miniature Lamp Co)

Hygrade's main (and most of the time only) plant was located in Salem, Massachusetts. It had opened in February 1916 when the equipment was relocated from the former small manufacturing shop in Danvers. (Note: See Sanborn Fire Insurance maps for Danvers. The 3-storey shop had not much more square feet than a residential home 42.56682°N 70.9411°W)

In 1917 acquired the F. V. Rooney Lamp Co and Dexter Lamp Co. and the Alpha Lamp Co. in 1918. Companies acquired with their General Electric licenses (quotas) were the Lux Manufacturing Co (Note: the company could produce 15 lamps per hour when it was founded in 1911 (with $25,000 of capital). In 1913 it moved from 52 Grove Street, New York City to Hoboken and in 1918 to a factory on East Kinney Street, Newark. The Federal Trade Commission alleged that Hygrade violated the Clayton Act with unfair practices lessening competition, but the complaint was dismissed.) in 1922 and Triumph Lamp Co. (Note: acquired in January 1928 when it had a production capacity for 2,000,000 lamps per year in Indianapolis. The equipment was brought to Salem) in 1928.

In August 1928 Hygrade acquired the assets and quotas of the Vosburgh Miniature Lamp Co., (Note: Incorporated in 1915 to produce tungsten and gas-filled automobile lamps. The factory was located in West Orange, New Jersey. The business had existed under that name since 1902) which produced five million automobile bulbs a year. This made Hygrade the third largest producer of large bulbs and fourth largest producer of auto bulbs (in the United States). The assets were moved to the Salem plant.

Hygrade produced vacuum tubes beginning in 1928 through the wholly owned subsidiary Neptron Corp. Production was moved from Beverly to Salem at the end of 1928, at which time daily production totaled 1,000 vacuum tubes.

In October 1928 Hygrade (and/or independent underwriters) made an initial public offering. (Note: The company offered 15,500 shares of its no-par $6.50 convertible preferred at $99 and 17,000 shares of its no-par common at $39, apparently an initial public offering. (Note: "Application will be made to list the stock on the Boston Stock Exchange" (began trading there at $39 at the end of November) Also, "Hygrade Lamp" yields no search results in the Commercial & Financial Chronicle before 1928 and the 1928-10-13 entry contains no V. xxx p. yyy backlink The Boston Exchange de-listed the company on July 16, 1935.) All but 500 preferred shares were not new financing, but stock previously acquired from individuals. Total capitalization was: 18,300 preferred authorized and outstanding; 154,300 common authorized, 117,684 outstanding, 36,600 reserved for conversion of the preferred)

Management consisted of Frank A. Poor, Edward J. Poor, and Walter E. Poor; they and their families owned more than 50% of the company's stock.

Hygrade entered into a license agreement with RCA for the manufacture of vacuum tubes in May 1929, when its daily output was 5,000 and plans were in place to produce 15,000 by September 1929. Production capacity in June 1930 was 20,000 tubes per day, total sales in 1929 was 624,000 tubes and contracts entered into indicated that 1930 would surpass this number.

The Hygrade Employee's Association was formed in January 1919, every dollar paid in was matched with one dollar from the company. The association provided sickness/disability and life insurance.
