= Ledvance =

German lighting company

Ledvance GmbH
- Type: GmbH
- Industry: Lighting
- Founded: July 2016
- Headquarters: Garching bei München, Germany
- Key people: Qinghuan Sun (Managing Director)
- Products: LED lamps, traditional lamps, standardized luminaires and intelligent, networked technologies in the Smart Home and Smart Building sectors
- Revenue: €1.35 billion (2023)
- Number of employees: 2,685 (2023)
- Parent: MLS Co., Ltd.
- Website: ledvance.com

Ledvance GmbH, headquartered in Garching bei München, Germany, is a general lighting and smart home technology company. It was established in 2016 as a spin-off from Osram Licht AG. Since April 2018, Ledvance has been wholly owned by Chinese lighting company MLS.

The company generated revenue of €1.35 billion in 2023 and is active in over 140 countries.

== History ==
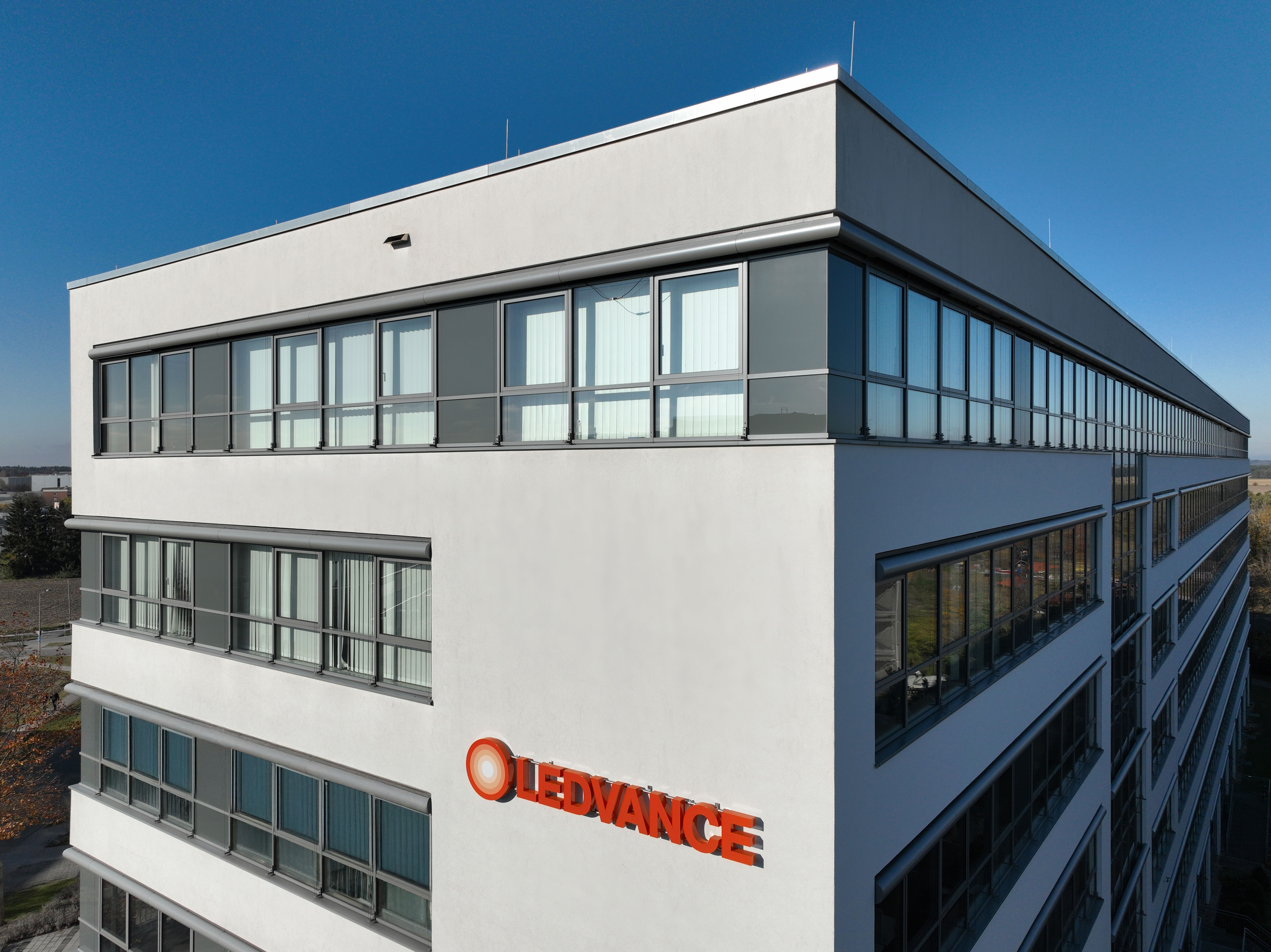
Ledvance Headquarters in Garching, Germany

In April 2015, it was announced that Osram would divest its general lighting lamp business, which accounted for just over one-third of its workforce. In June 2015, the supervisory board of Osram Licht AG agreed to the divestment of their lamp division with products such as LED lamps, halogen lamps, and compact fluorescent lamps. This divested division has been operating as a legally independent company under the name Ledvance since April 2016. The company is permitted continued use of the brand names Sylvania throughout the United States and Canada, and Osram in Europe.

At the end of July 2016, Osram announced that Ledvance would be sold for more than €500 million to a Chinese consortium consisting of investor IDG Capital, LED packaging manufacturer MLS, and Yiwu. The sale was completed on 3 March 2017, with economic effect as of 1 March 2017. Due to the takeover, MLS gained distribution networks in Europe and the United States. Since April 2018, MLS has been the sole owner of Ledvance.

In the course of the takeover and the subsequent reorganization, some former Osram sites were closed and Ledvance shifted its operations and distribution strategy.

In 2023, Ledvance opened a training facility in Westfield, Massachusetts. In September 2024, Ledvance and Osram announced that they would extend their brand licensing partnership for general lighting lamps for the next decade.

In January 2025, Ledvance acquired the Arnsberg-based firm Loblicht.

== Products ==
Ledvance is a leading manufacturer and distributor of lamps and luminaires, offering various products for both Smart Home and Smart Building sectors. The products are distributed through channels including wholesale, retail, and online platforms.

Their products are sold under the Ledvance, Bellalux, Osram, and Sylvania brand names.

Since 2024, the company has also been marketing products under the name Ledvance Renewables, consisting of photovoltaic modules, inverters, and battery energy storage systems.

== Company structure ==
Ledvance is owned by Chinese lighting enterprise MLS Co., LTD. Ledvance has over 50 subsidiaries and forms a subgroup within the MLS group of companies. In 2023, Ledvance generated revenues of €1.35 billion. The company generates a large part of its revenue from the sale of luminaires, and it is regarded as the second-largest company in the global lighting market.

The company is headquartered in Garching bei München, Germany, with subsidiaries and offices in over 50 countries and operations in more than 140 countries worldwide. The regional organizational structure is divided into three main areas: Western Europe, Emerging Markets (Asia/Pacific, Middle East and Africa, Eastern Europe and Latin America), and United States and Canada (USC). The USC region is headquartered in Wilmington, Massachusetts.

== Awards (Selection) ==
- 2021: German Innovation Award for the Lux at Home floor lamp and the Lux-O-Meter-App.
- 2021: Eight Adex Platinum Awards and Adex Award for Design Excellence by Design Journal for the Sylvania UltraLED Ultrasonic Stairwell Fixture in the category Best of 2021 Product.
- 2023: Silver medal in the Ecovadis Sustainability Ranking.
- 2024: German Innovation Award for the Everloop Linear Indiviled, in the category Excellence in Business to Business: Lighting Solutions.
- 2024: Best Retrofit Project at the Energy Managers Canada Awards for lighting retrofit solutions at the Metro Toronto Convention Centre.
