= Osram Sylvania =

North American operation of lighting manufacturer OSRAM

OSRAM Sylvania Inc.
- Industry: Lighting
- Founded: 1993; 33 years ago
- Founder: Frank Poor
- Headquarters: Wilmington, Massachusetts, United States
- Key people: CEO Grant Wright
- Number of employees: 11,200
- Parent: Osram Licht AG
- Website: www.osram.us

Osram Sylvania Inc. is the North American operation of lighting manufacturer Osram. It was established in January 1993, with the acquisition of GTE's Sylvania lighting division by Osram GmbH. In 2016, Osram spun off its general lighting business to Ledvance which received a license to sell lighting products under the Osram and Sylvania names.

The company produces lighting products for industrial, entertainment, medical, and smart building and city applications, as well as products for the automotive aftermarket and original equipment manufacturer markets.

Osram Sylvania completed a move of its regional headquarters from Danvers, Massachusetts, to Wilmington, Massachusetts, on October 12, 2015.

== Company profile ==
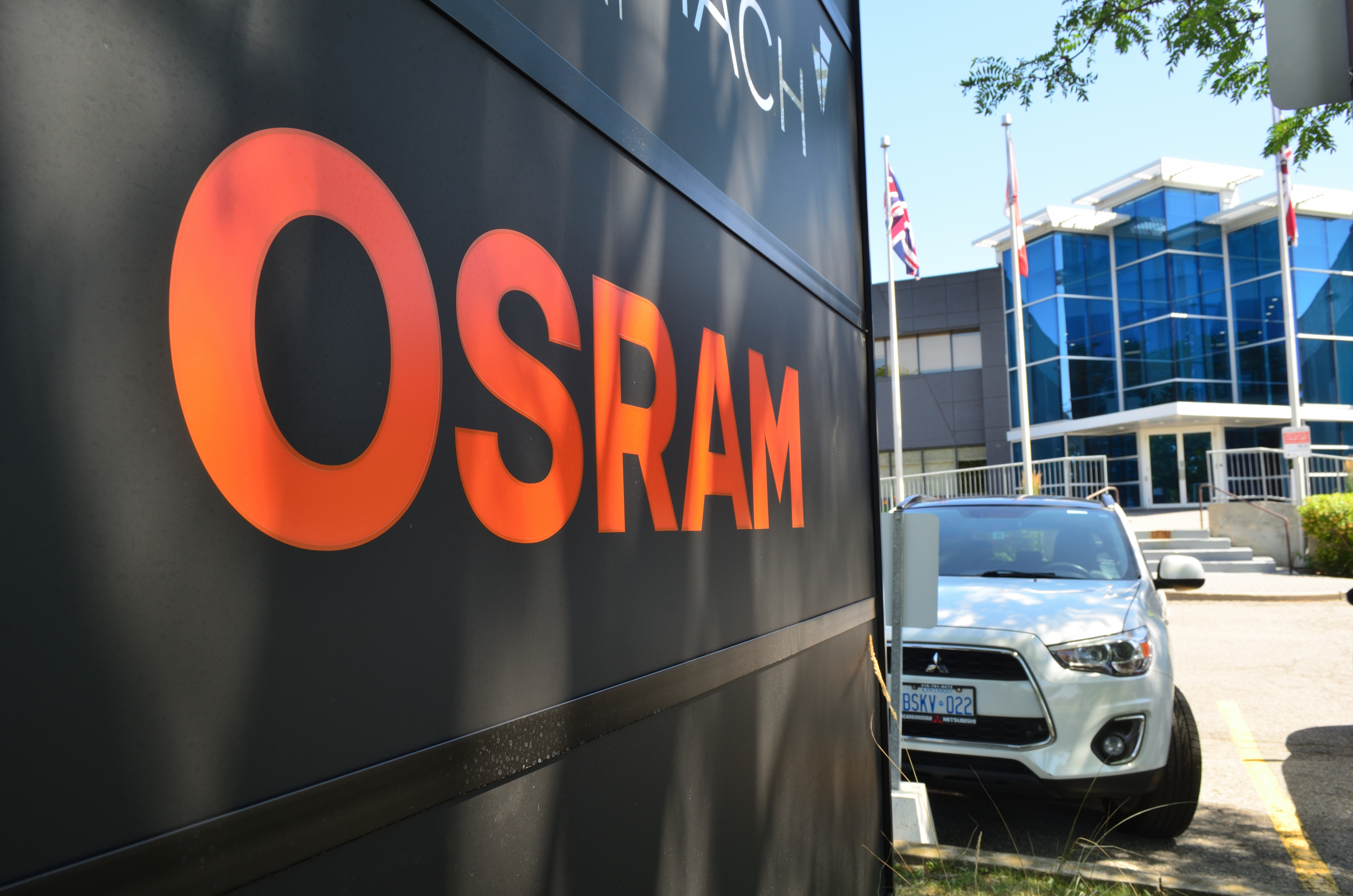
OSRAM in Ontario

Osram Sylvania sales in North America totaled about €1.1 billion in fiscal year 2016, a 9.1% growth, comprising 29% of Osram sales worldwide. Osram Sylvania employs about 2,900 people and has 5 manufacturing plants, 1 equipment design and development operation, 2 centralized research and development locations, along with a network of sales offices, focused R&D locations, and distribution centers across the United States, Canada, and Mexico.

In July 2015, Osram appointed Grant Wright as the CEO for the Americas region, and the business is now organized into four Business Units: Specialty Lighting; Opto Semiconductors; Digital Systems, and Lighting Solutions.
