= Osram =

German lighting manufacturer

OSRAM Licht AG
- Type: Subsidiary
- ISIN: DE000LED4000
- Industry: Semiconductor / Photonics
- Predecessor: Auergesellschaft
- Founded: 1 July 1919; 107 years ago (Berlin)
- Headquarters: Munich, Germany
- Parent: ams-OSRAM AG (80,3%) (2020–present)
- Subsidiaries: Osram Opto Semiconductors; OSRAM Sylvania
- Website: www.ams-osram.com www.osram.com

OSRAM Licht AG is a German company that makes electric lights, headquartered in Munich and Premstätten (Austria). OSRAM positions itself as a high-tech photonics company that is increasingly focusing on sensor technology, visualization and treatment by light. The company serves customers in the consumer, automotive, healthcare and industrial technology sectors. The operating company of OSRAM is OSRAM GmbH.

Osram was founded in 1919 by the merger of the lighting businesses of Auergesellschaft, Siemens & Halske and Allgemeine Elektrizitäts-Gesellschaft (AEG). In 1933, Osram donated 40,000 Reichsmarks to the Nazi Party in the 1933 elections. Osram was a wholly owned subsidiary of Siemens AG from 1978 to 2013. On 5 July 2013, Osram was spun off from Siemens, and the listing of its stock began on Frankfurt Stock Exchange on 8 July 2013. Osram's business with conventional light sources was spun off in 2016 under the name Ledvance and sold to a Chinese consortium.

After a bidding war with Bain Capital, Osram was taken over by Austrian company AMS in July 2020. Since then, the company has operated under the name AMS Osram. The name is derived from osmium and Wolfram, German for tungsten. Both elements were commonly used for lighting filaments at the time the company was founded.

== History ==
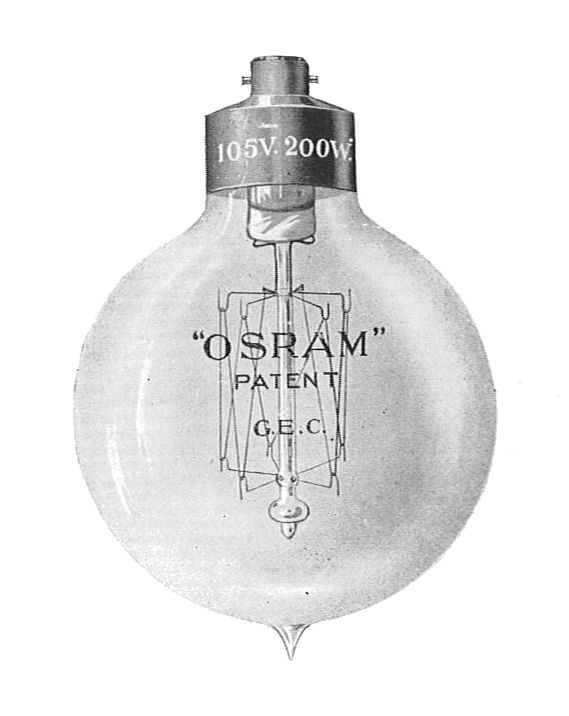
Osram lamp of 1910, high candlepower type

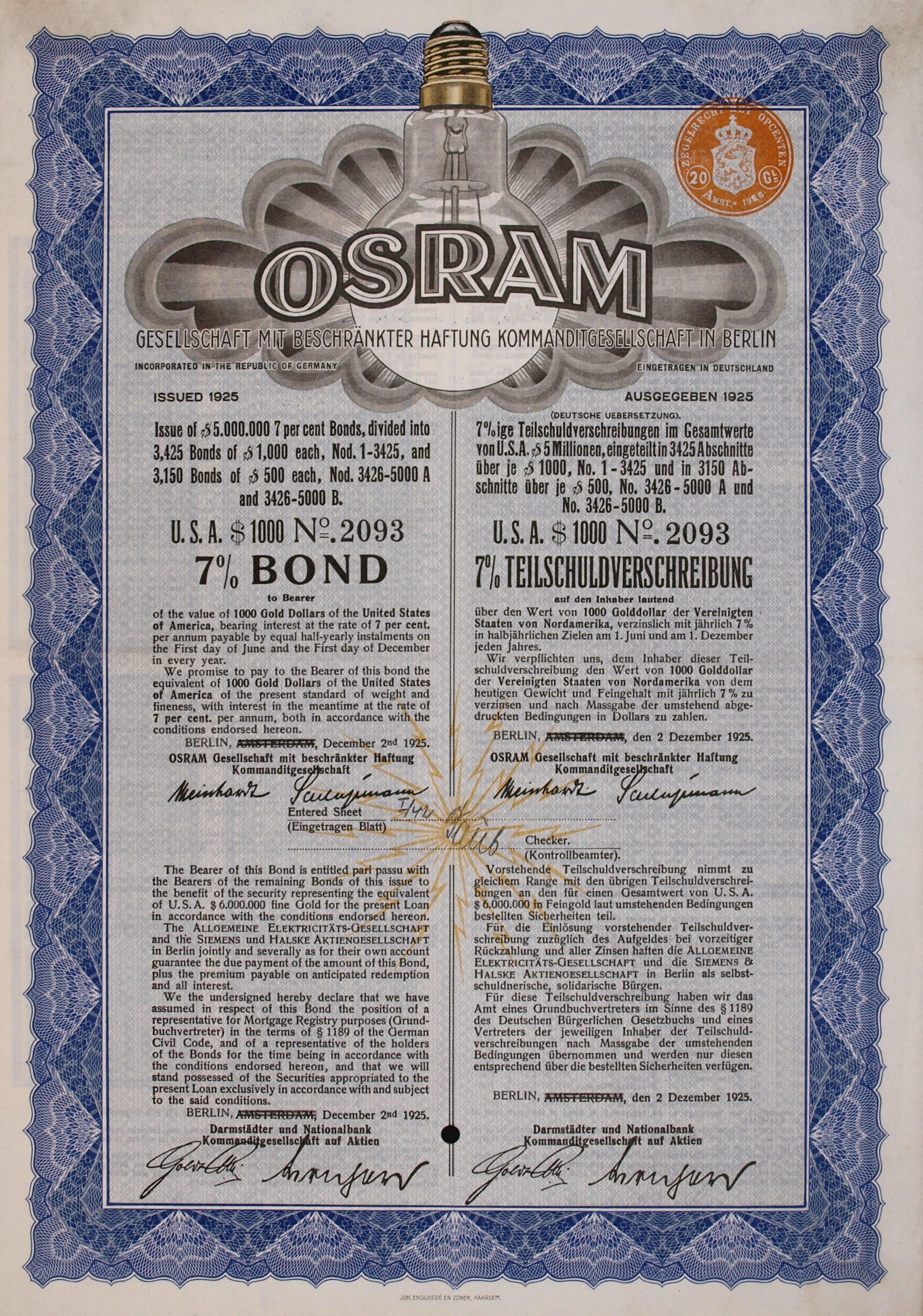
bilingual bond of the Osram company, issued 2 December 1925

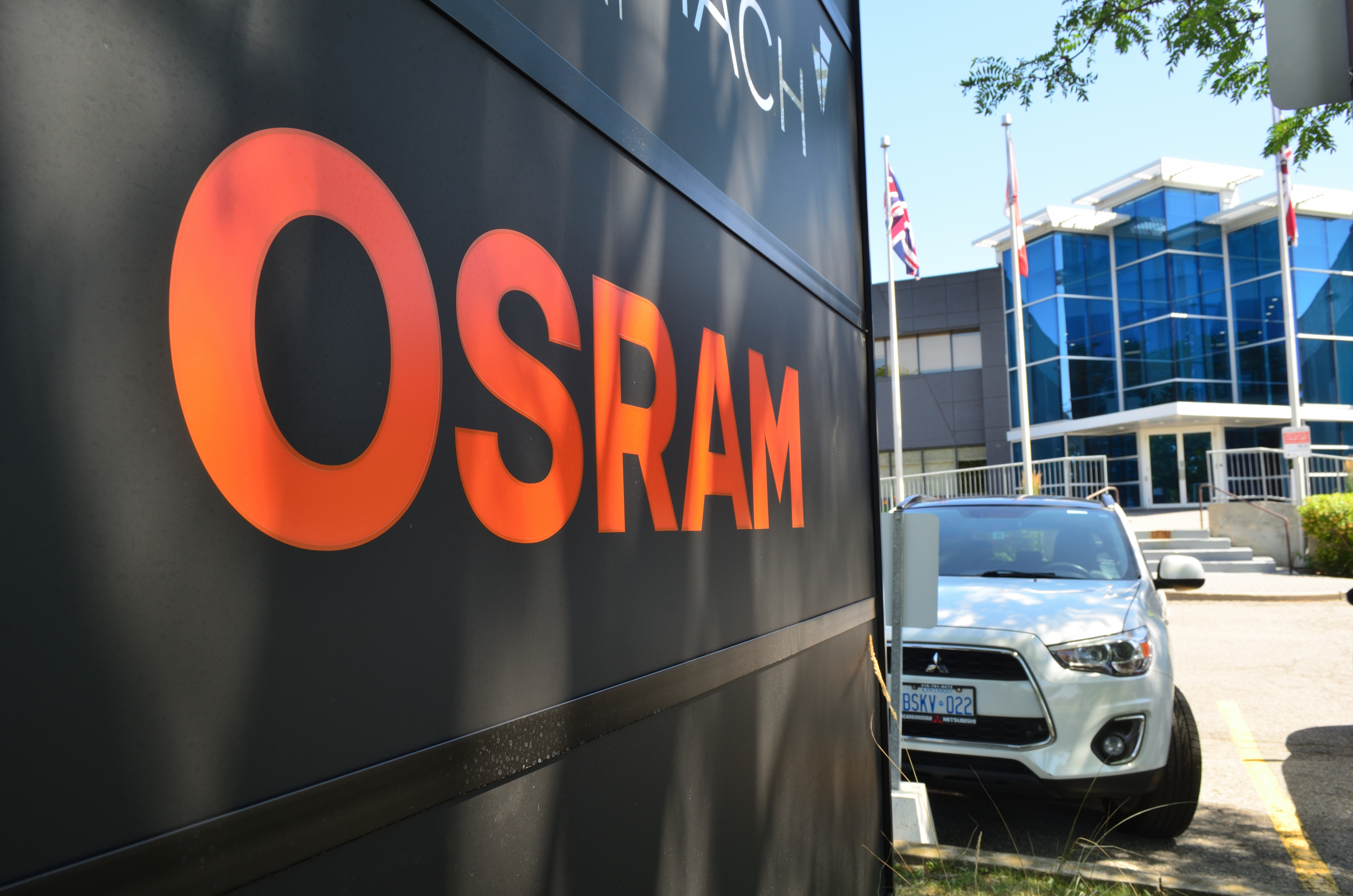
OSRAM in Markham, Ontario

In 1906, the Osram incandescent lamp was developed by Carl Auer von Welsbach. The brand name of Osram was first used in 1906 and registered by the Deutsche Gasglühlicht-Anstalt (also known as Auer-Gesellschaft).

The British General Electric Company imported Osram filaments for their own production of light bulbs. In 1919, Auergesellschaft, Siemens & Halske and Allgemeine Elektrizitäts-Gesellschaft (AEG) combined their electric-lamp production with the formation of the company Osram.

Following the Nazi seizure of power in 1933, co-founder William Meinhardt and the other Jewish members of the managing board were forced to step down. During the rule of his successor, Hermann Schlüpmann, organisations close to the Nazi Party, such as DAF, became increasingly influential among the company's workforce. In March 1933, Osram funded 40,000 ℛ︁ℳ︁ for a secret campaign fund of German industrialists in support the Nazi Party.

During World War II, Osram used forced labour in their plants in Berlin. Due to the bombing of Berlin, production was partially relocated to eastern German cities from 1942 onward. The production of molybdenum and tungsten products, which were classified as important for the war effort, was outsourced to the city of Plauen. Following arrangements between Osram officials and members of the SS, two subcamps of Flossenbürg concentration camp were installed next to the factory site to secure the company's supply of slave labourers. In a subcamp in Leitzmeritz, prisoners were used to build underground facilities as part of the secret project Richard II to secure the production of molybdenum and tungsten during air raids. At least 4,500 prisoners died in the camp, while Osram never moved into the space due to the course of war.

In 1993, Osram Sylvania, a North American division, was established with the acquisition of GTE's Sylvania lighting division. Osram Sylvania manufactures and markets a wide range of lighting products for homes, business, and vehicles and holds the largest share of the North American lighting market.

In fiscal year 2006, the company achieved sales of about 2 billion euros, which comprised 43% of total Osram sales. In 1998, Osram acquired the lamp business of ECE Industries India for $9.55 million. In 2009, Osram acquired Traxon Technologies. In 2011, Osram acquired Siteco. On 8 July 2013 Siemens spun Osram off, and Osram listed on the Frankfurt Stock Exchange. In 2019, Osram sold Sylvania to Wesco International, Inc.

On 3 March 2021, ams AG announced that the Domination and Profit and Loss Transfer Agreement (“DPLTA”) between AMS Offer GmbH, a wholly owned subsidiary of AMS AG, the parent company of AMS Group, and Osram Licht AG (“Osram”), became effective on that day. The combined company focuses on optical systems and serves the entire value chain including sensing, visualization and illumination, with products ranging from emitters to sensors and software.

== Operations ==
Osram is a multinational corporation with headquarters in Munich, with around 34,000 employees throughout the world. Osram has operations in over 120 countries.

In fiscal year 2019, Osram's business model was operationally implemented in three business units: Opto Semiconductors, Automotive and Digital.

=== Opto Semiconductors ===

The Opto Semiconductors Business Unit provides opto semiconductors, which are crucial elements in lighting, visualization, and sensor technology. Osram Opto Semiconductors offers a wide range of LEDs in the low-power, mid-power, high-power, and ultra-high-power classes that are used in general lighting, automotive, consumer, and industrial applications as well as infrared, laser and optical sensors. The main market for these components are the automotive sector, smartphones, wearables, general lighting, lighting for plants, industrial lighting, and projection.

=== Automotive ===
The Automotive Business Unit develops and produces lamps; light modules; and sensors for auto makers and their suppliers and the spare parts aftermarket.

Up to the beginning of the fiscal year 2019, the automotive and other areas of business comprised the Specialty Lighting Business Unit. As part of a reorganization and the subsequent renaming of the business unit as AM, these other areas of business have been incorporated into the Digital Business Unit.

=== Digital ===
The Digital Business Unit was established at the start of the fiscal year 2019. It handles all of Osram's business activities that use digital technologies.

The former Lighting Solutions Business Unit was dissolved at the start of the fiscal year 2019. Traxon's business was incorporated into the new Digital Business Unit. The European luminaire business (Siteco) and the North American luminaire service business are reported as discontinued operations.

== In popular culture ==
- German football manager Jupp Heynckes was nicknamed "Osram" because his face would sometimes redden under the stress of matches.

== See also ==
- EnOcean
- Fluorescent lamp
- Phoebus cartel
