= Johns Manville Plaza =

404-foot-tall skyscraper in Denver, Colorado

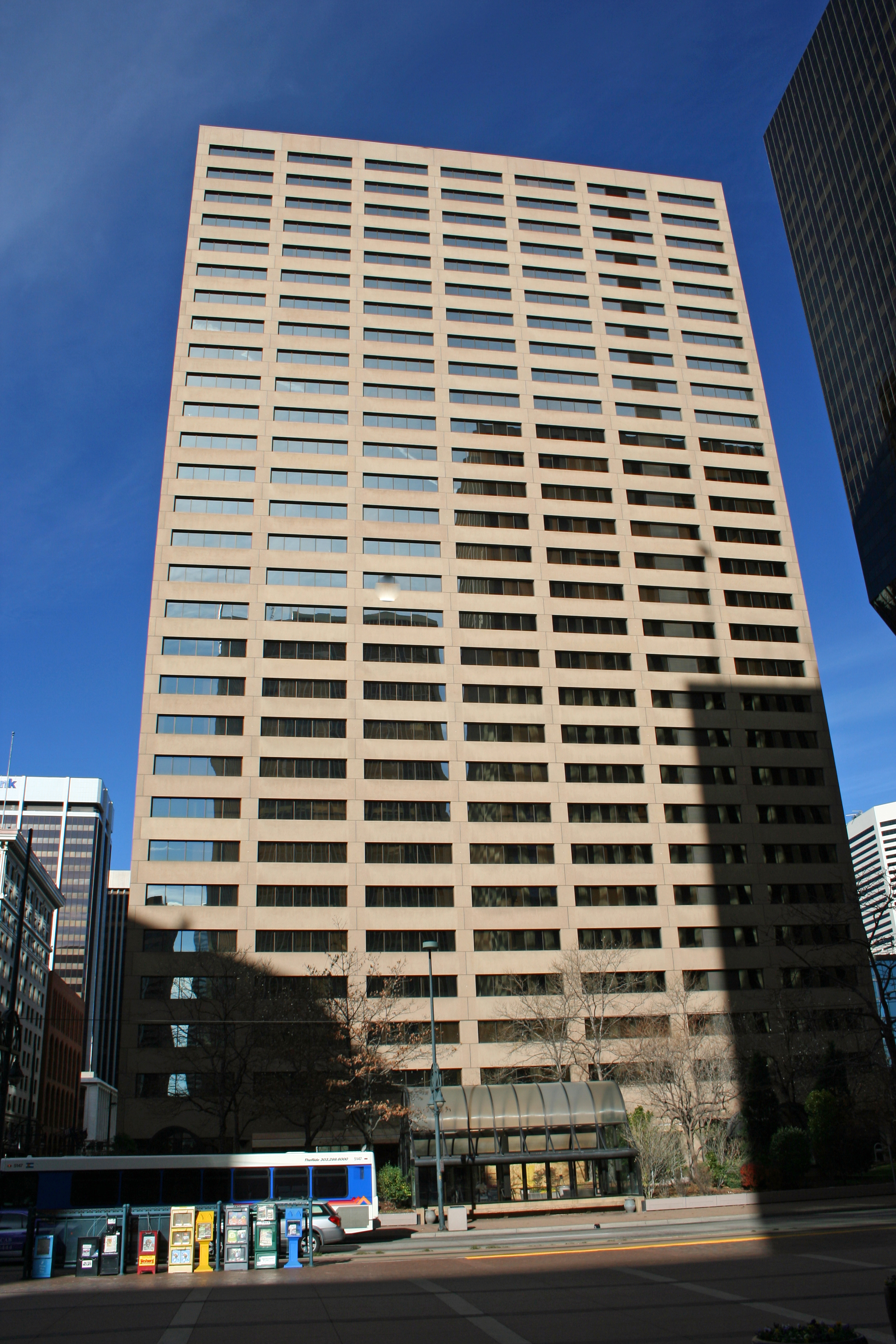
- Johns Manville Plaza
- Interactive map of the Johns Manville Plaza area

General information
- Type: Office
- Location: 717 17th Street, Denver, Colorado
- Coordinates: 39°44′49″N 104°59′28″W
- Completed: 1978
- Owner: Brookfield Properties

Height
- Roof: 404 feet (123 m)

Technical details
- Floor count: 29
- Floor area: 70,580 m^{2} (759,700 sq ft)

Design and construction
- Architects: Hellmuth, Obata and Kassabaum
- Main contractor: Al Cohen Construction Company

Johns Manville Plaza is a 404-foot-tall skyscraper (123 m) in Denver, Colorado. It was completed in 1978 and has 29 floors. The building was designed by Hellmuth, Obata and Kassabaum and built by Al Cohen Construction. It is owned by Brookfield Properties, and is the 16th tallest building in Denver. Reflective solar glass windows alternating with 5-foot-wide columns (1.5 m) makes up the outer walls. A plaza, basement, and loading dock are shared with 707 17th Street.

== See also ==
- List of tallest buildings in Denver
