= Granite Tower (Denver) =

Denver skyscraper

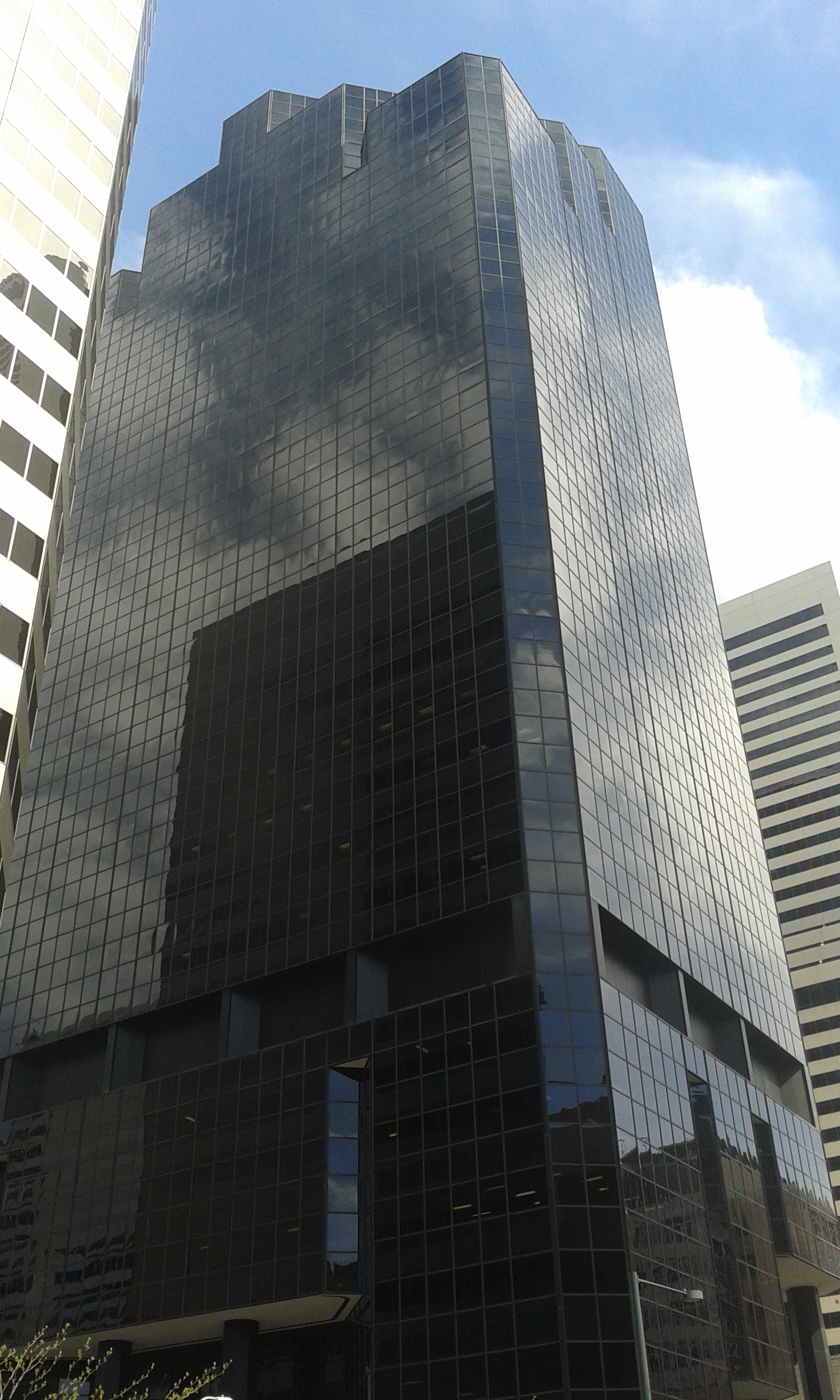
- Granite Tower's southwest facade and south corner seen from Curtis Street south of 18th Street.
- Interactive map of the Granite Tower area

General information
- Type: corporate offices
- Location: Denver, Colorado
- Coordinates: 39°45′00″N 104°59′32″W
- Completed: 1983

Height
- Antenna spire: none
- Roof: 397 ft (121 m)
- Top floor: unknown

Technical details
- Floor count: 31

Granite Tower, formerly Stellar Plaza and Plaza Tower, is located in the Downtown Denver, Colorado, at 1099 18th Street, Denver, CO. 80202. This office tower is part of Denver Place, a two city block mixed-use high-rise complex.

== See also ==
- List of tallest buildings in Denver
