= The Curtis =

Luxury high-rise hotel in Denver, United States

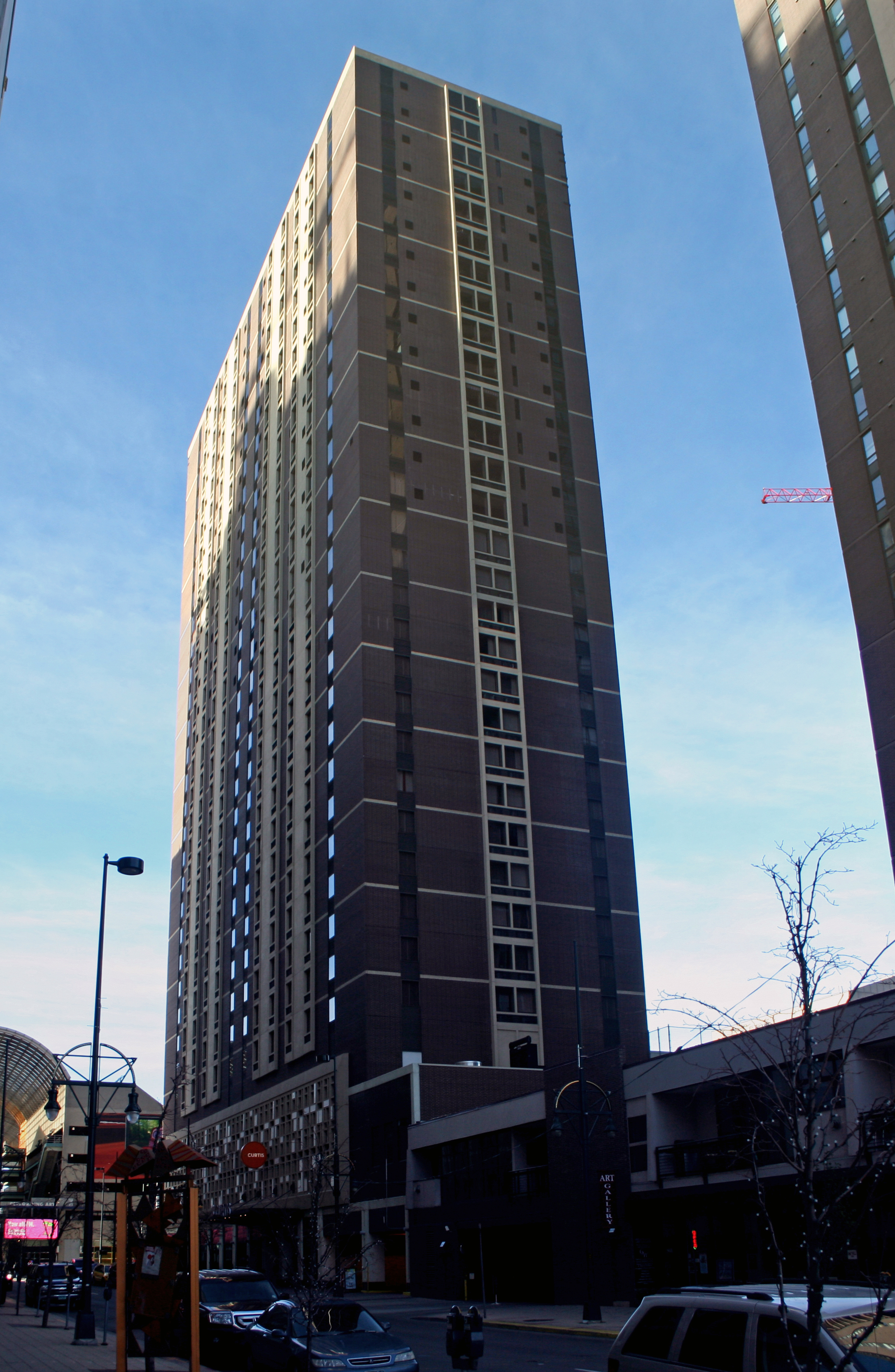
- The Curtis
- Interactive map of the The Curtis area

General information
- Type: Hotel
- Location: 1405 Curtis Street, Denver, Colorado
- Coordinates: 39°44′45″N 104°59′49″W
- Completed: 1974

Height
- Roof: 350 ft (110 m)

Technical details
- Floor count: 30

The Curtis - A DoubleTree by Hilton Hotel is a 350 ft (107m) tall skyscraper in Denver, Colorado. It was completed in 1974 as and has 30 floors. It is the 31st tallest building in the city.

The building was originally a mixed-use development called the Executive Tower Inn. Atop a three-story podium, it had hotel rooms on floors 4-16 and offices on floors 17–30. The offices closed in 1994 and the building was redeveloped in 2007 by Sage Hospitality Resources, with the hotel portion relaunched as The Curtis and the former offices on the top floors converted to dormitories for the nearby Auraria Campus, known as Auraria Student Lofts. The Curtis joined the DoubleTree division of Hilton on January 5, 2010.

== See also ==
- List of tallest buildings in Denver
