= Denver Energy Center =

Office complex in Denver, Colorado

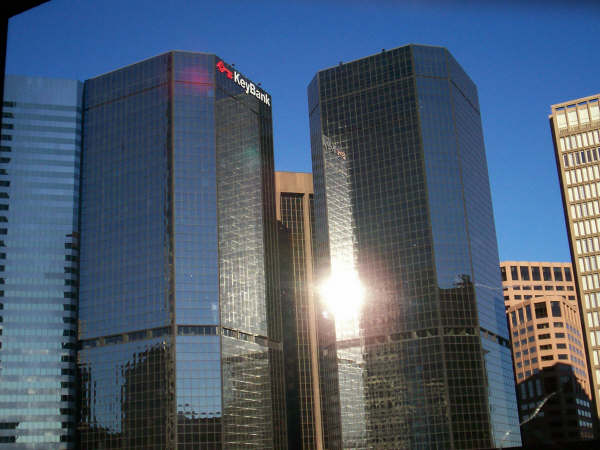
- Interactive map of the Denver Energy Center area

General information
- Status: Completed
- Location: 1625 Broadway (I), 1675 Broadway (II), Denver, Colorado
- Coordinates: 39°44′32″N 104°59′16″W
- Completed: 1979
- Owner: Luzzatto Company

Height
- Roof: 99 m (325 ft) (I), 109 m (358 ft) (II)

Technical details
- Floor count: 28 (I), 29 (II)

Design and construction
- Architect: Skidmore, Owings and Merrill LLP

Denver Energy Center is an office complex in Denver, Colorado, comprising Denver Energy Center I and II. Both buildings were owned by Rosemont Realty Inc. until the property was sold at auction in June 2022. It was formerly known as Denver World Trade Center, which relocated to another Denver location.

== Facilities ==
Denver Energy Center I is 99 m (325 ft) tall and was completed in 1979 at 1625 Broadway. It has 28 floors and is the 42nd tallest building in Denver.

Denver Energy Center II is 109 m (358 ft) tall and was completed in 1980 at 1675 Broadway. It has 29 floors and is the 30th tallest building in Denver.

The office complex includes two Class A LEED Gold certified towers and have a combined total area of 785,549 square ft.

== History ==
The Denver Energy Center was completed in 1979. In April 2013, it was sold for $176 million to Gemini Rosemont, a company based in Los Angeles.

In June 2022, an affiliate of JP Morgan Chase was the sole bidder on the foreclosed Denver Energy Center buildings. The buyer was also the lender on the 785,549 square foot property, paying $88.2M for the building in the foreclosure auction. In September 2025, the building was sold once again at auction to Luzzatto Company, this time for just $5.3 million, valuing it at just 3% of the purchase price it fetched in 2013. Luzzatto announced plans to convert the two buildings into at least 1,200 apartments.

== Gallery ==
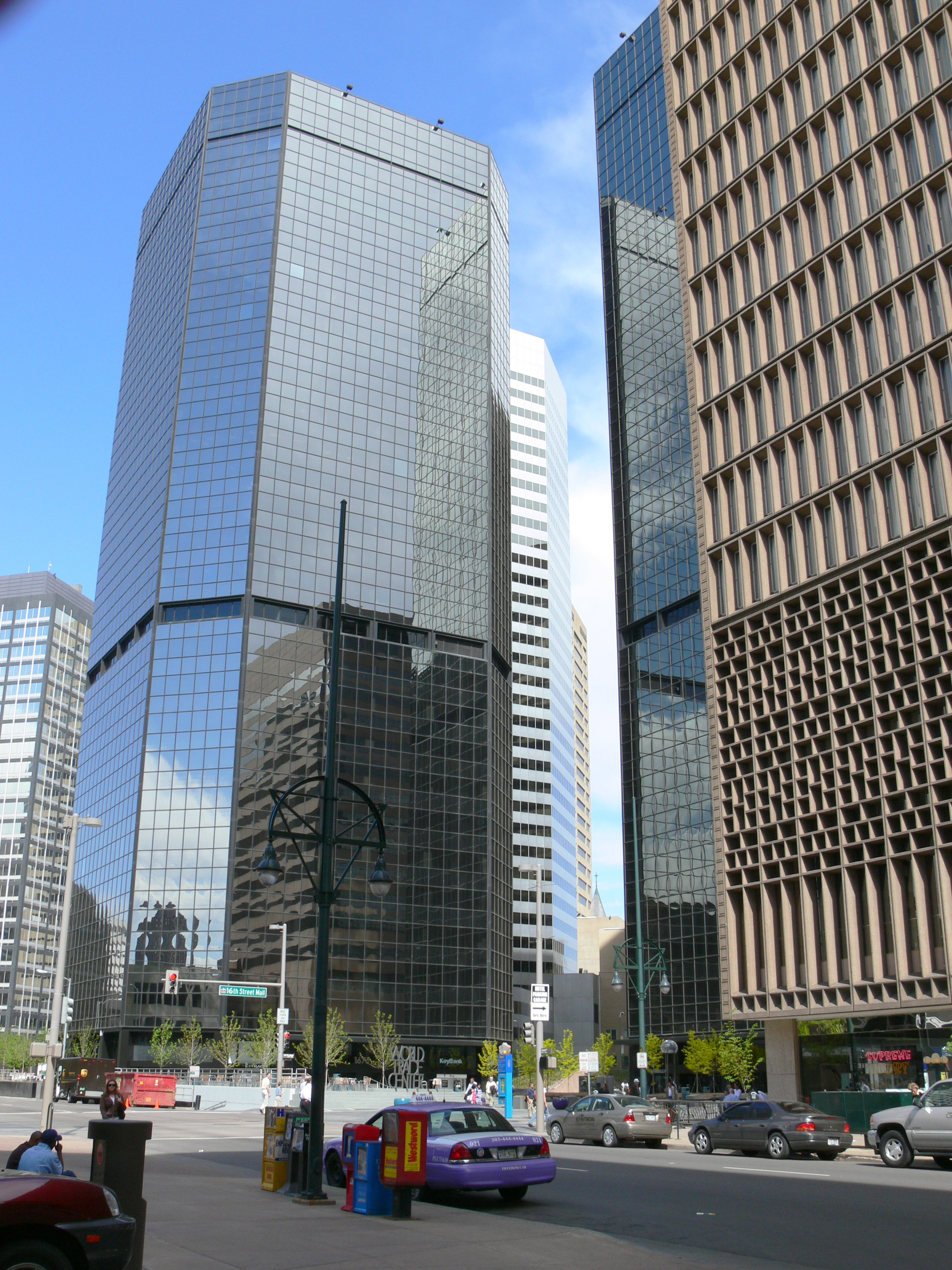

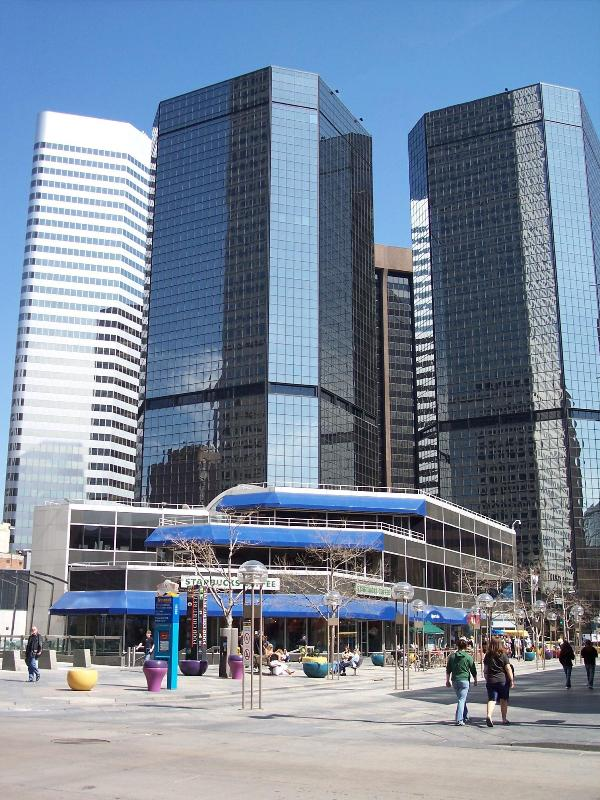

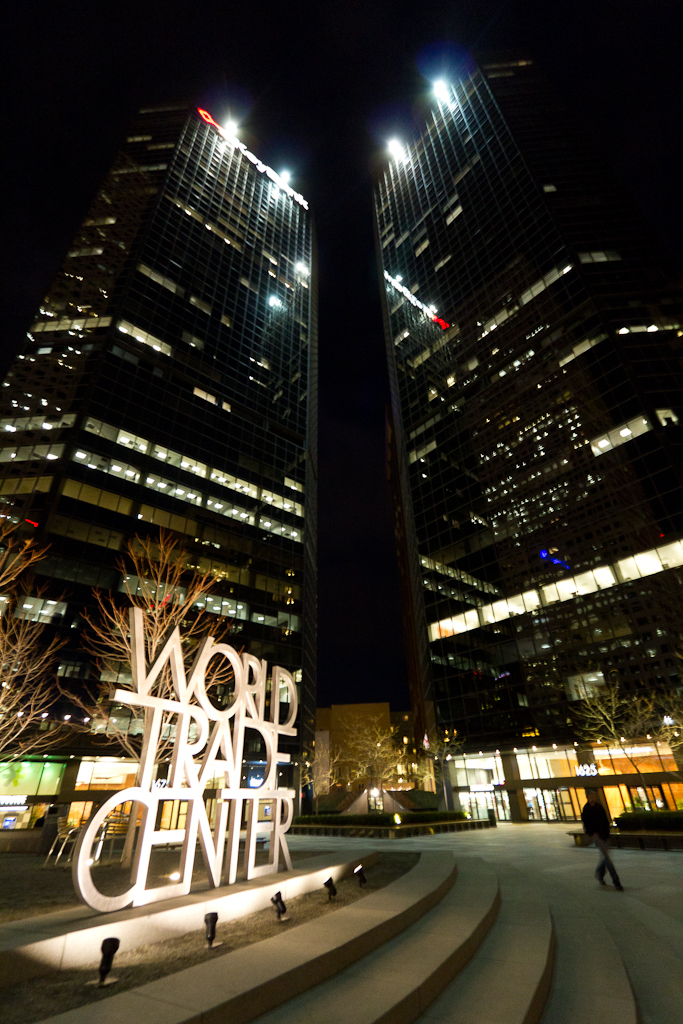

== See also ==
- List of tallest buildings in Denver
