= 17th Street Plaza =

Skyscraper in Denver, Colorado

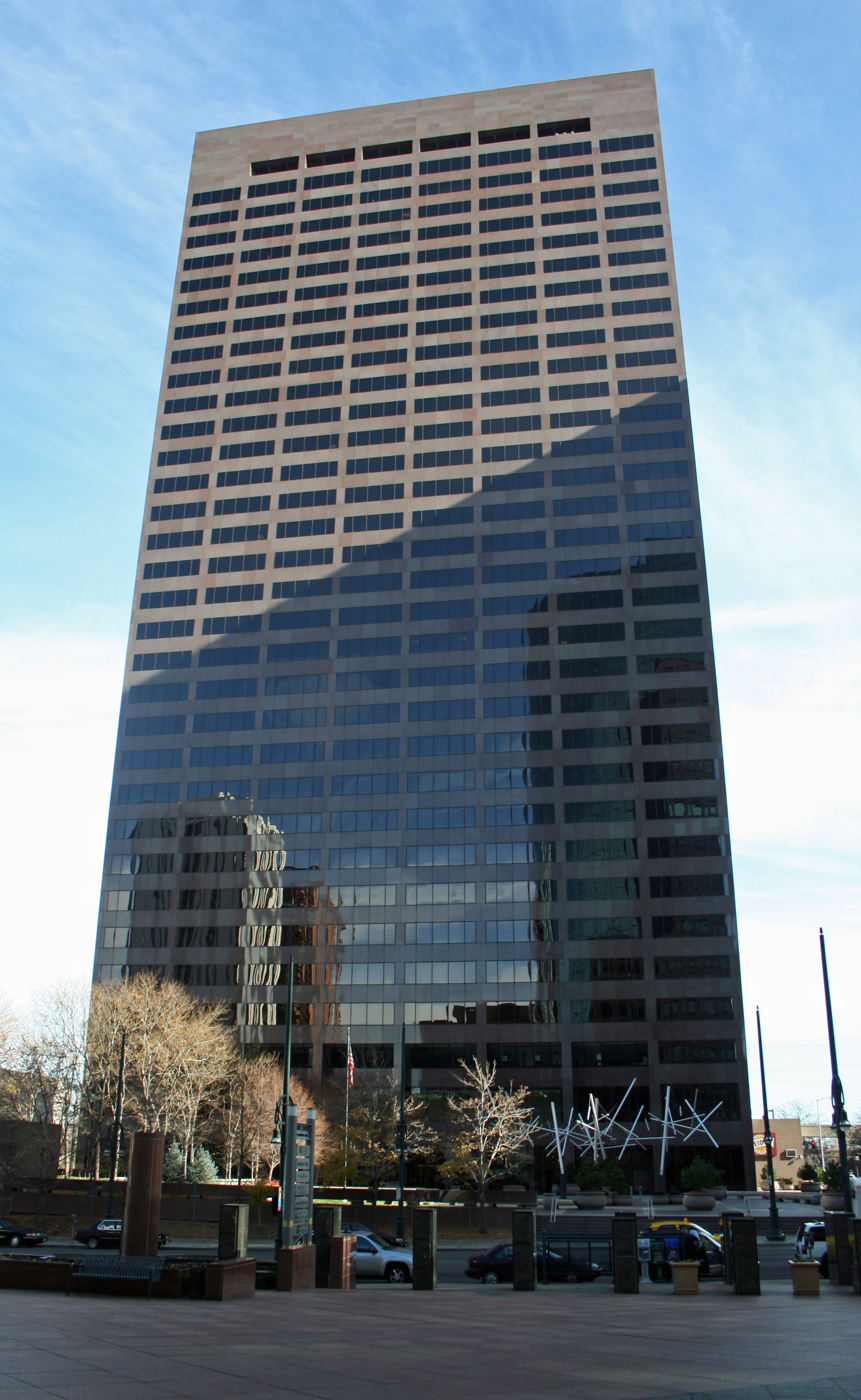
- 17th Street Plaza

General information
- Status: Completed
- Type: Office
- Location: 1225 17th Street, Denver, Colorado
- Coordinates: 39°45′01″N 104°59′43″W
- Completed: 1982
- Owner: Plant Holdings North America, Inc.

Height
- Roof: 438 ft (134 m)

Technical details
- Floor count: 33
- Floor area: 666,652 sq ft (61,934.0 m^{2})

Design and construction
- Architect: Skidmore, Owings & Merrill

17th Street Plaza is a 438 ft (134 m) tall skyscraper in Denver, Colorado. It was completed in 1982 and has 33 floors, with a total area of 695,000-square-feet. It was designed by Skidmore, Owings & Merrill and Wendel Duchsherer Architects. It is currently (2026) the 13th tallest building in Denver.

In 2009 the building was bought from J.P. Morgan for an estimated $135 million by HRPT Properties Trust. The building was reported to be 93 percent leased, with occupants including Molson Coors, KPMG, Marsh & McLennan, Consulate General of Japan , and the Macquarie Group. In 2019, Plant Holdings North America, Inc. purchased the property.

== See also ==
- List of tallest buildings in Denver
