= Dominion Plaza =

Office complex in Denver, Colorado

Dominion Towers
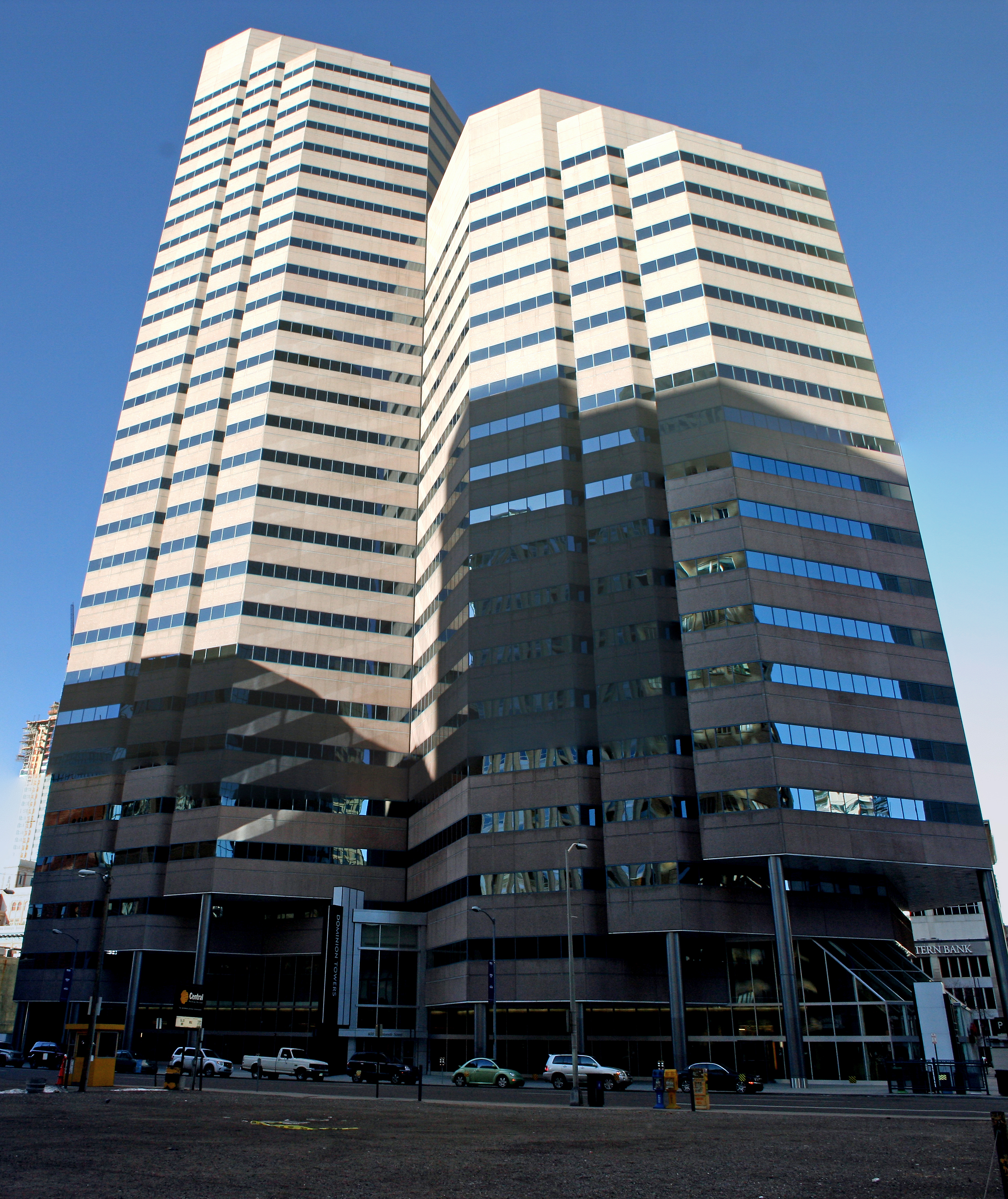
- The Dominion Towers office buildings in Denver, Colorado
- Interactive map of the Dominion Towers area

General information
- Type: Office
- Location: 600 17th Street, Denver, Colorado
- Coordinates: 39°44′42″N 104°59′28″W
- Completed: 1982

Height
- Roof: 384 ft (117 m)

Technical details
- Floor count: 28

Dominion Towers is an office complex in Denver, Colorado. It consists of two adjoining towers, and was built in 1982. The taller one, Dominion Towers South, is 384 feet (117 m) tall and has 28 floors. The buildings have pink granite facades and blue-tinted windows.

== See also ==
- List of tallest buildings in Denver
