= Spire (Denver) =

High-rise building containing 496 condominium homes in Denver, Colorado

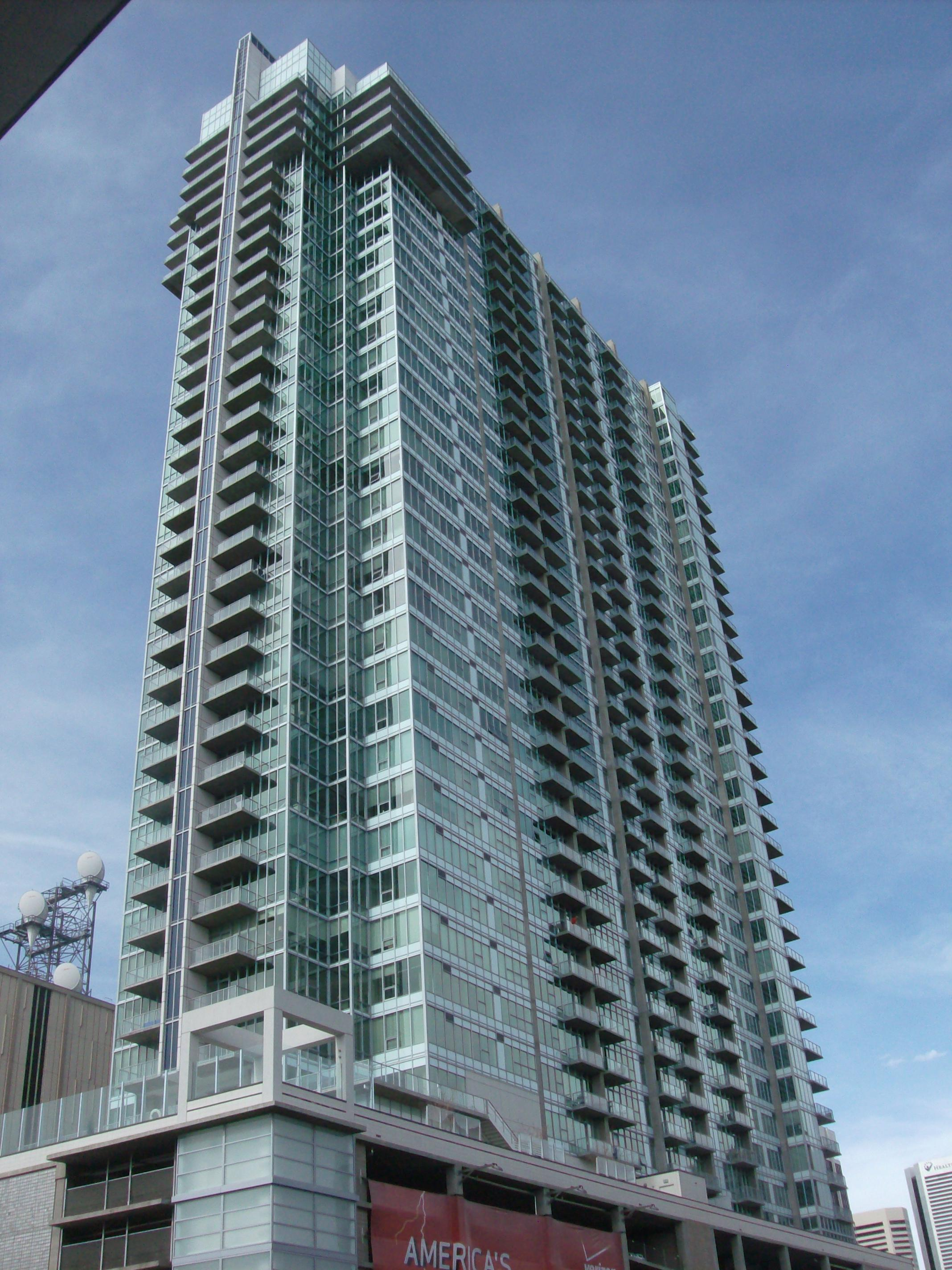
- Spire as seen from the Colorado Convention Center in March of 2012

- Location within Colorado

General information
- Status: Completed
- Type: Condominium
- Location: Denver, Colorado, United States
- Coordinates: 39.7445°N 104.9959°W
- Construction started: 2007
- Completed: 2009

Height
- Roof: 478 feet (146 m)

Technical details
- Floor count: 42
- Floor area: 528,000 sq ft

Design and construction
- Developer: Nichols Partnership
- Awards: 2010 Downtown Denver Partnership Award 2009 NAIOP "Development of the Year" 2009 Rocky Mountain Real Estate Challenge "Project of the Year - Multifamily"

Other information
- Number of units: 496

Website
- www.highrises.com/denver/spire-condos/

Spire is a high-rise building containing 496 condominium homes in Denver, Colorado, in the United States. Standing at 147.2 metres (483 ft) with 42 floors, Spire is the tenth tallest building in Denver and was designed by architecture firm RNL Design.

The building is at 14th Street and Champa Street in downtown Denver. It cost $175,000,000 to build, from 2007 to 2009. It is a LEED (Leadership in Energy and Environmental Design) certified building with 528,000 square feet (49,100 m^{2}) of total space which includes 35,000 square feet (3,300 m^{2}) of amenity space, including a gym, pools and a spa, a top floor lounge, and 9,000 square feet (840 m^{2}) of shops on the ground floor. It contains one-, two-, and three-bedroom units. It is currently owned by Plant Holdings NA, Inc.

The average price per square foot in January 2018 was $648.50/sf.
