= One Tabor Center =

Skyscraper in Denver, Colorado

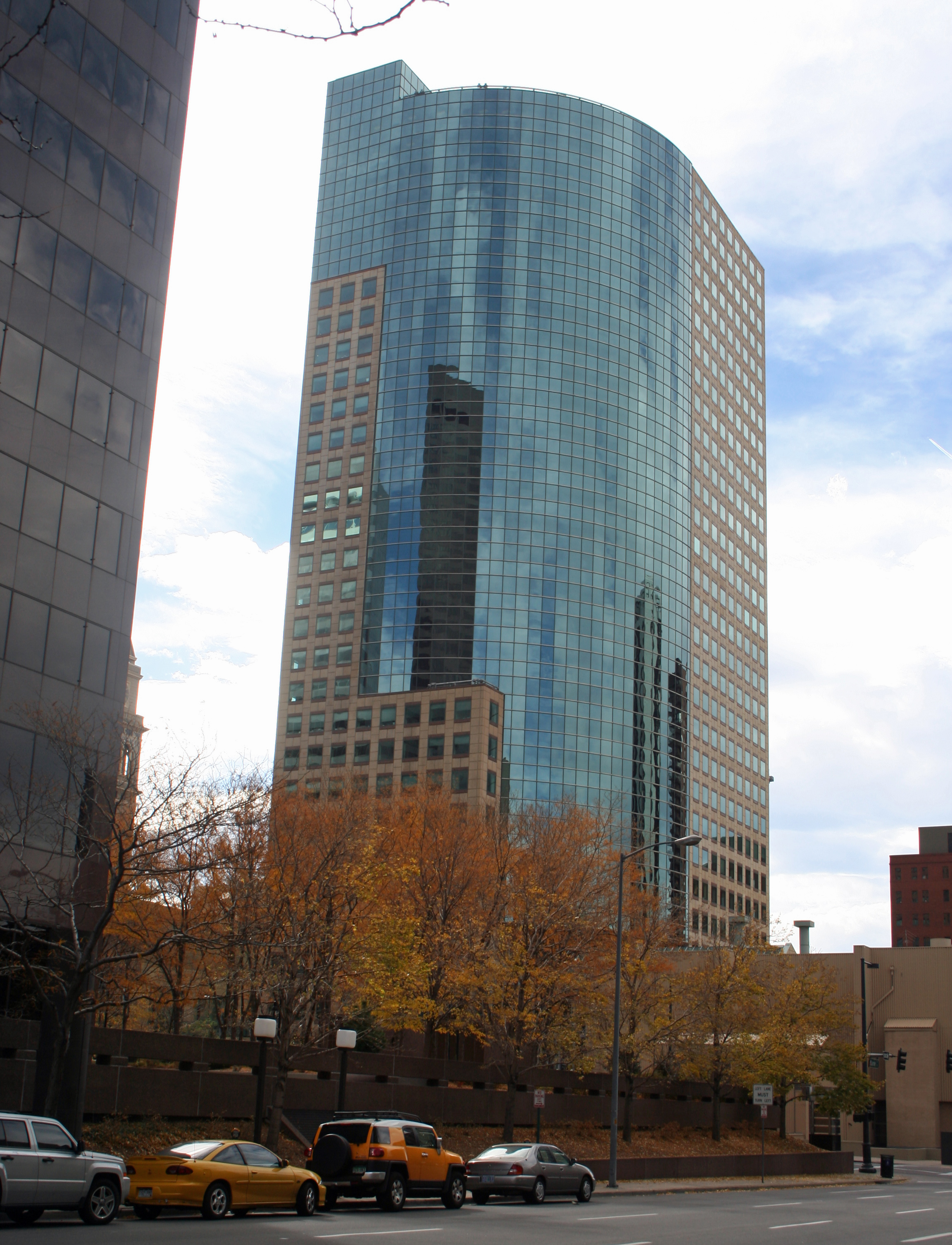
- Interactive map of the One Tabor Center area

General information
- Type: Office
- Location: 1200 17th Street, Denver, Colorado
- Coordinates: 39°44′57″N 104°59′46″W
- Completed: 1984

Height
- Roof: 408 feet (124 m)

Technical details
- Floor count: 30
- Floor area: 557,097 sq ft (51,756.0 m^{2})

Design and construction
- Architect: Kohn Pedersen Fox Associates

One Tabor Center is a 408 feet (124 m) tall skyscraper in Denver, Colorado. The building was completed in 1984 and has 30 floors. It is the 15th tallest building in Denver. The building, designed by Urban Design Group, has a floor area of 669,000 sq ft (62,200 m^{2}) and is located at 1200 Seventeenth Street, on Lawrence between Sixteenth and Seventeenth flanked on the 16th side by the covered Tabor Center Mall and on 17th by an open plaza.

When developed in 1984, there was intended to be a "Two Tabor Center" on the opposite corner of the block (Seventeenth and Larimer Streets), a building mirroring One Tabor with a rounded facade facing its sister. This was never completed due to the economic conditions at the time. However, the foundation and caissons for this yet-to-be-built high-rise were constructed and can be seen covered artfully by aluminum sheathing. In early 2018 work was completed on an enhanced outdoor public plaza facing 17th Street as well as a remodeled entrance that can serve as the primary entrance for both Tabor One and Tabor Two towers. Additionally, adequate parking for both Tabor One & a second commercial tower were provided and exist underneath today. Several design iterations with a proposed second tower have been released over the years. Most recently in March 2018 an updated, yet still complementary, tower design named "Two Tabor" was revealed and in May 2018 a site development plan was officially submitted to the City and County of Denver's Planning department for review and ultimate approval. The more modern design calls for a 35-story, 495-foot commercial tower (~88 feet taller than One Tabor) that would ultimately complete the Tabor Center development and original vision. A construction commencement date has yet to be released and as of early 2021 the project has yet to start.

== See also ==
- List of tallest buildings in Denver
