= Denver Financial Center =

High-rise office building in Denver, Colorado

Denver Financial Center I
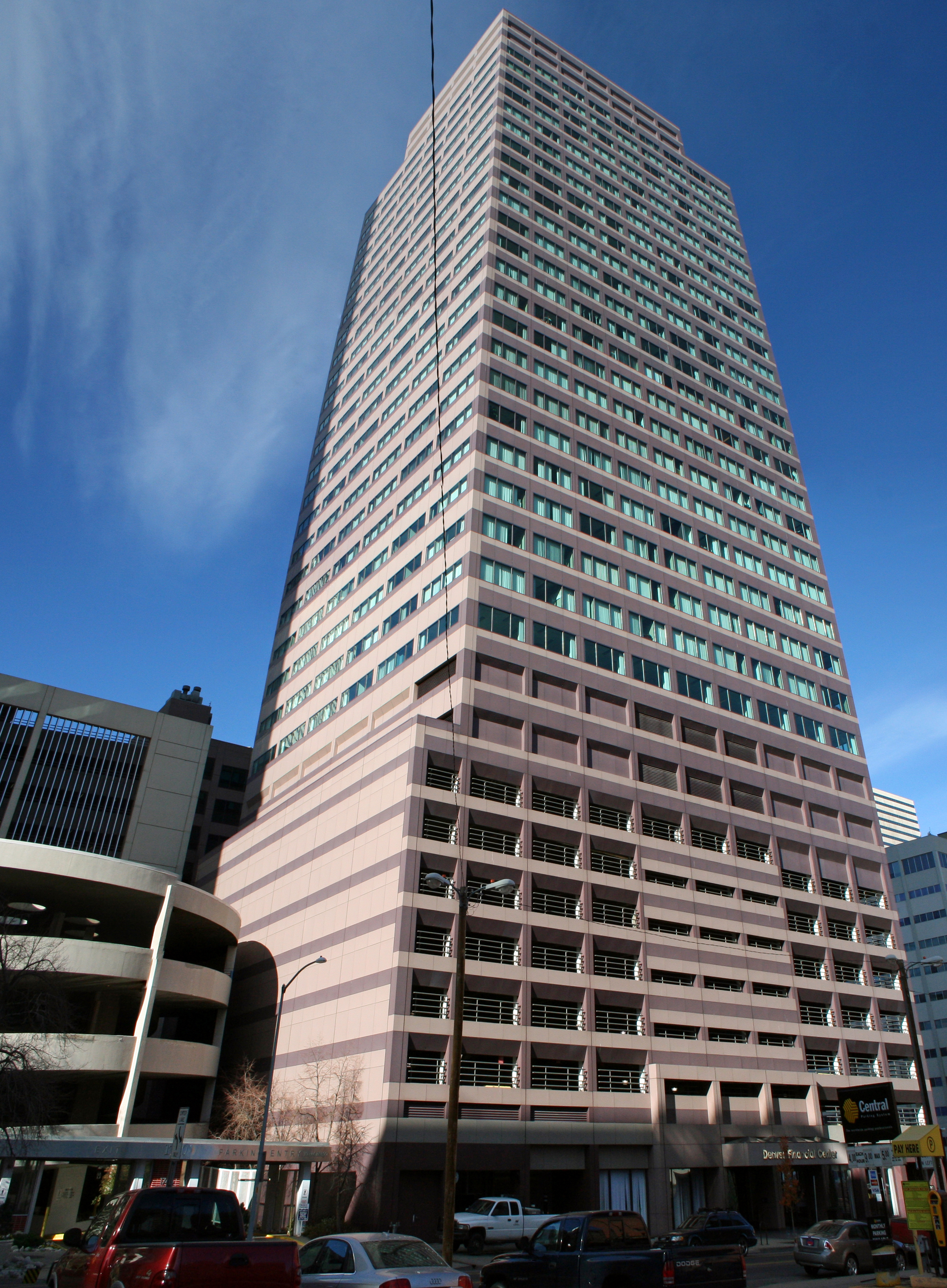
- Interactive map of the Denver Financial Center I area

General information
- Type: Office
- Location: 1775 Sherman Street, Denver, Colorado
- Coordinates: 39°44′41″N 104°59′05″W
- Completed: 1981
- Owner: Lincoln Property Company

Height
- Roof: 374 feet (114 m)

Technical details
- Floor count: 32
- Floor area: 436,000 square feet (40,500 m^{2})

Denver Financial Center I is a high-rise office building located at 1775 Sherman Street in Denver, Colorado. Built in 1981 as the Mellon Financial Center, the tower has 32 floors. At 374 feet (114 m), it is currently the 23rd tallest building in Denver. USAA Real Estate purchased the building for $84 million in 2008. In October 2018, the building was sold for $95.25 million to Lincoln Property Company.

== See also ==
- List of tallest buildings in Denver
