= One Lincoln Park, Denver =

Residential tower in Denver

Coordinates: 39.7478°N 104.9865°W

One Lincoln Park
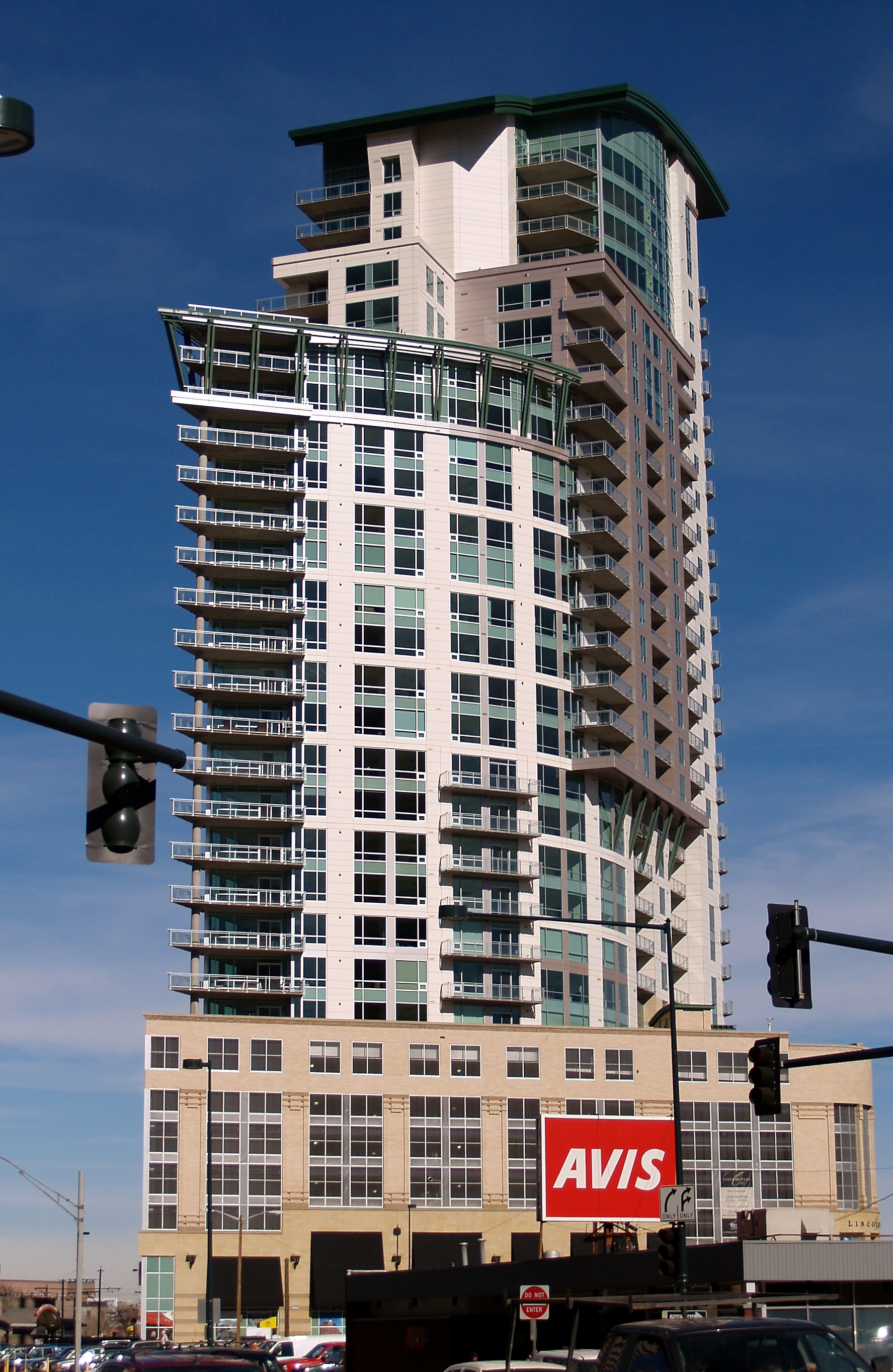
- One Lincoln Park
- Interactive map of the One Lincoln Park area

General information
- Type: Condominium
- Location: 2001 Lincoln Street, Denver, Colorado, United States
- Construction started: 2006
- Completed: 2008
- Cost: $140,000,000 (2007)

Height
- Height: 380 ft (116 m)

Technical details
- Floor count: 31

Design and construction
- Architecture firm: Buchanan Yonushewski Group
- Developer: Osborn Development
- Main contractor: Swinerton Group
- Awards and prizes: 2010 - Downtown Denver Partnership "Project of the Year"

Other information
- Number of units: 177
- Public transit access: 20th & Welton Station RTD L Line

References
- https://www.bizjournals.com/denver/stories/2007/10/29/story7.html

One Lincoln Park is a residential tower in Denver, reaching 32 stories and 380 feet (116 m) and is one of Denver’s tallest buildings. The building sits at the edge of the downtown grid and is bounded by Welton St, 20th St, Lincoln St, and 20th Ave. It is at the 20th & Welton station which services RTD’s light rail L Line.

The building consists of 177 units, up to 9,000 square feet of living space. It was designed by the Buchanan Yonushewski Group. Construction was completed in 2008 by the Swinerton Group, which also constructed the Four Seasons Hotel & Private Residences and Country Club Towers II & III high rises in Denver.

The Downtown Denver Partnership awarded One Lincoln Park the Project of the Year in 2010.

== Additional images ==
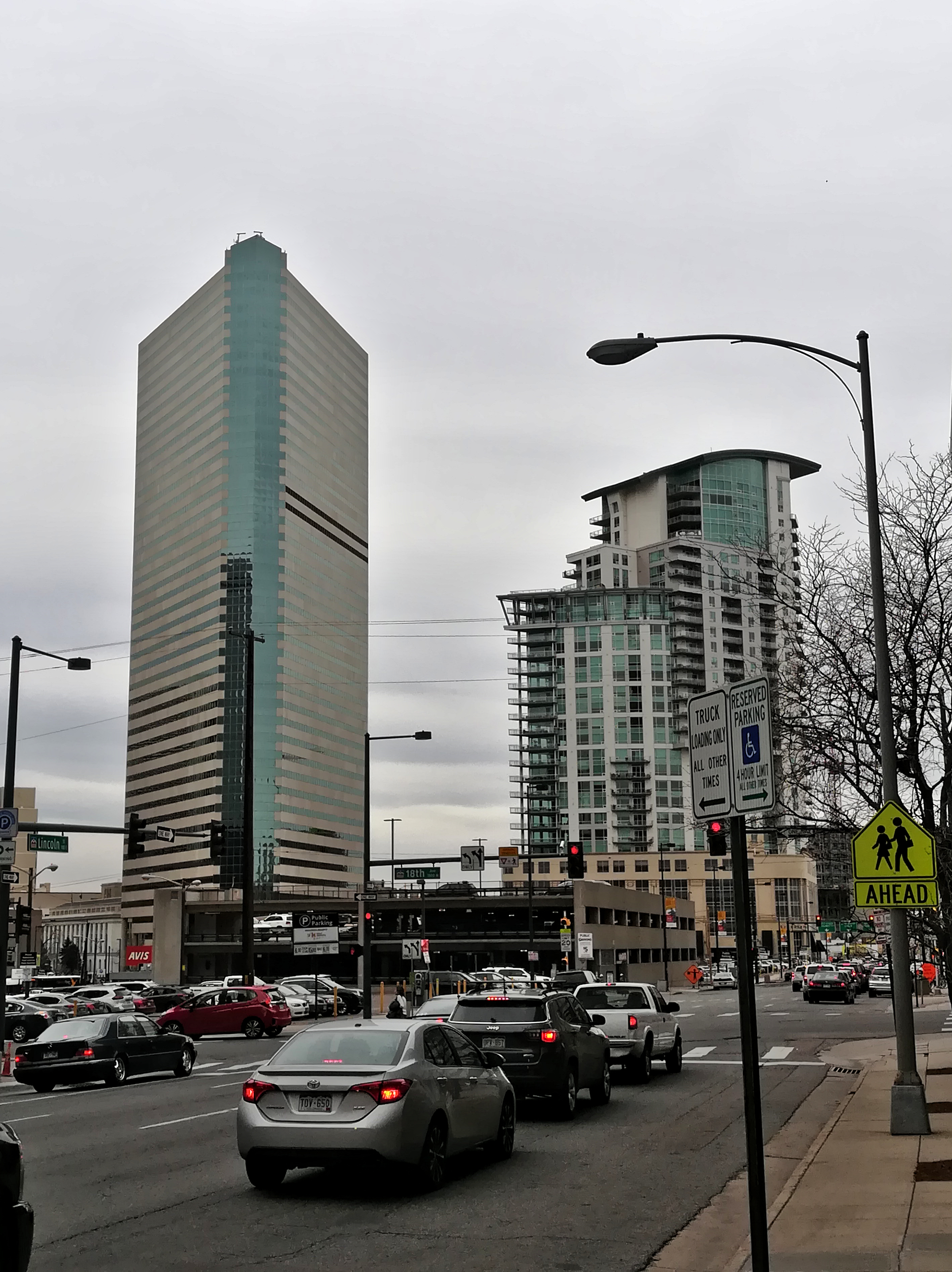
One Lincoln Park, on the right of this image, next to 1999 Broadway

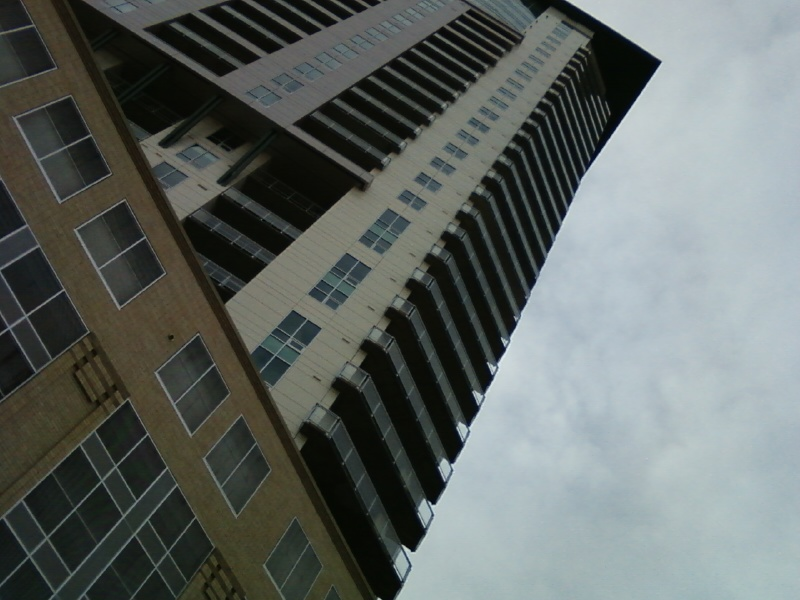
One Lincoln Park, looking up
