= Hyatt Regency Denver at the Colorado Convention Center =

Hyatt Regency Denver
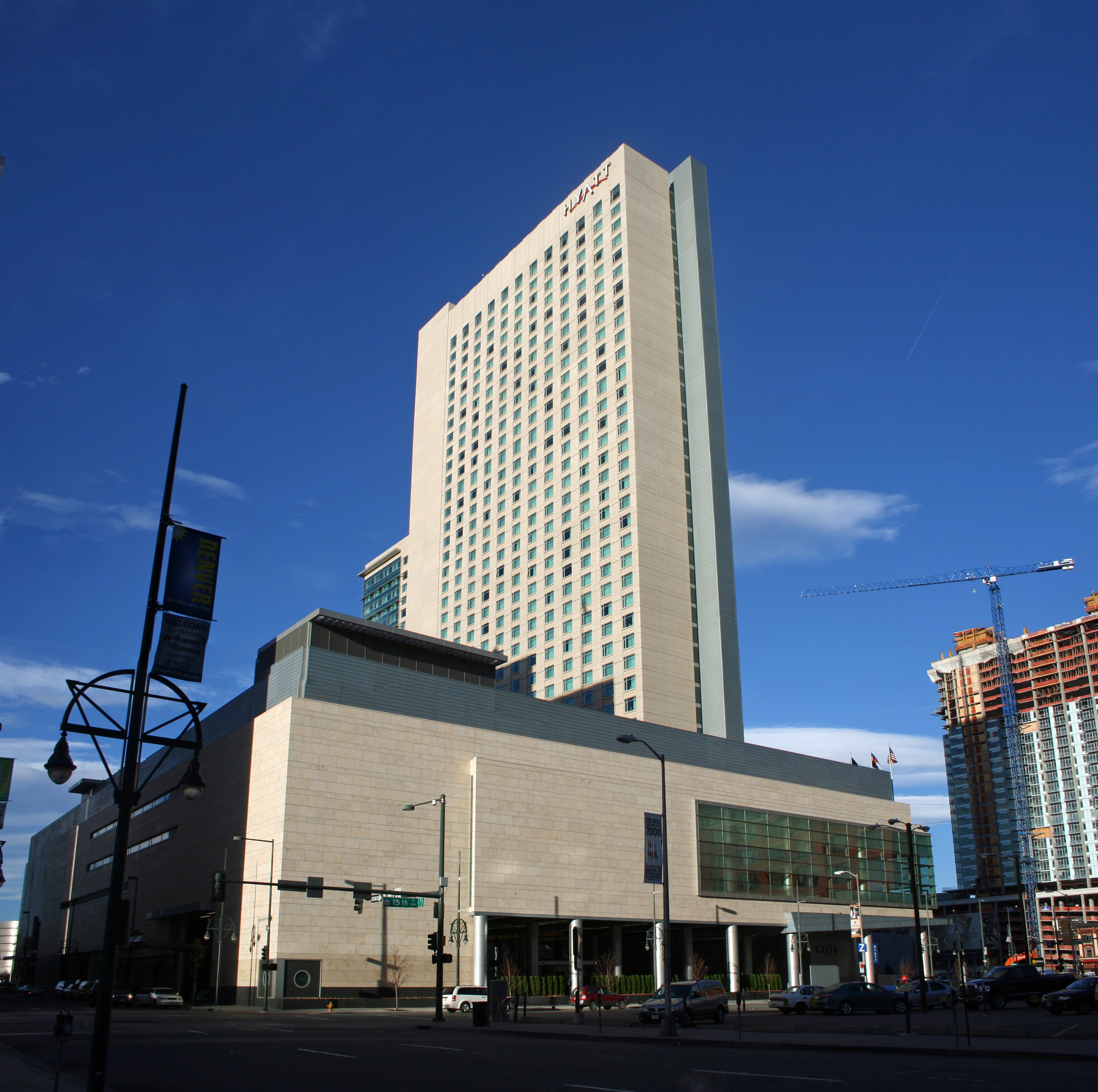
- The Hyatt Regency in Denver
- Interactive map of the Hyatt Regency Denver area

General information
- Type: Hotel
- Location: 650 15th St, Denver, CO 80202
- Coordinates: 39°44′37″N 104°59′37″W
- Construction started: June 30, 2003
- Completed: 2005
- Opening: December 20, 2005
- Cost: $354.8 million
- Owner: Plant Holdings NA, Inc.

Height
- Roof: 489 ft (149 m)

Technical details
- Floor count: 38
- Floor area: 111,483 m^{2} (1,199,990 sq ft)

Website
- denverregency.hyatt.com

The Hyatt Regency Denver at the Colorado Convention Center is a 489 ft (149 m) tall skyscraper in Denver, Colorado, United States. It was constructed from 2003 to 2005 and has 38 floors. It is the 8th tallest building in Denver. It is currently owned by Plant Holdings NA, Inc. and leased to Hyatt Corporation.

== See also ==
- List of tallest buildings in Denver
