= Lincoln Center (Denver) =

High-rise office building located 1660 Lincoln Street in Denver, Colorado

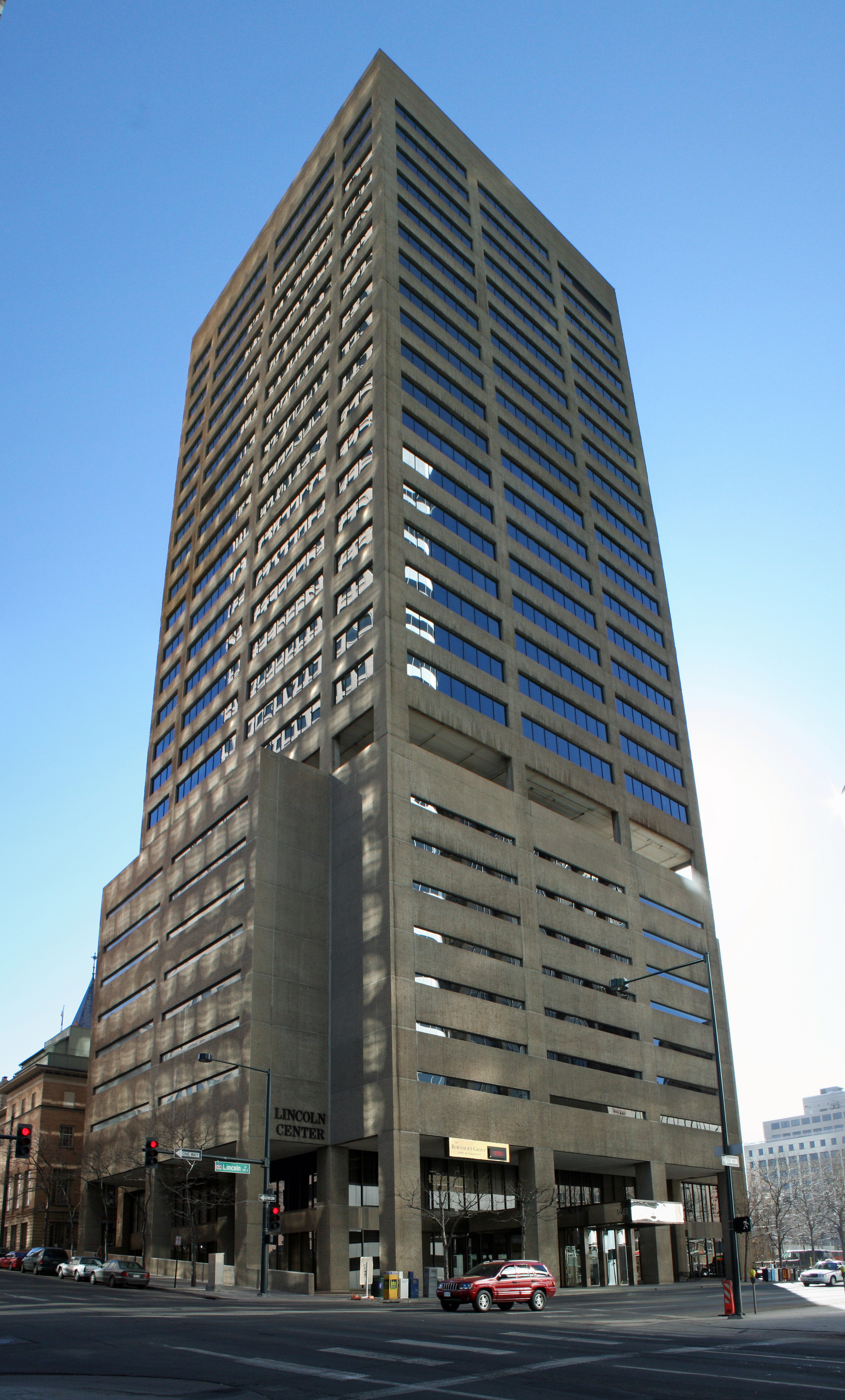
- The Lincoln Center office building in Denver, Colorado.
- Interactive map of the Lincoln Center area

General information
- Type: Office
- Location: 1660 Lincoln Street, Denver, Colorado
- Coordinates: 39°44′35″N 104°59′09″W
- Completed: 1972

Height
- Roof: 366 ft (112 m)

Technical details
- Floor count: 31

Design and construction
- Architects: William C. Muchow & Associates
- Main contractor: Al Cohen Construction Company

Lincoln Center is a 366 feet (112 m) tall high-rise office building located 1660 Lincoln Street in Denver, Colorado. It was completed in 1972 and has 30 floors. It is the 26th tallest building in Denver.

It was designed by William C. Muchow & Associates and built by the Al Cohen Construction Company.

== See also ==
- List of tallest buildings in Denver
