= 1125 17th Street =

Skyscraper in Denver, Colorado

Coordinates: 39.7497°N 104.9944°W

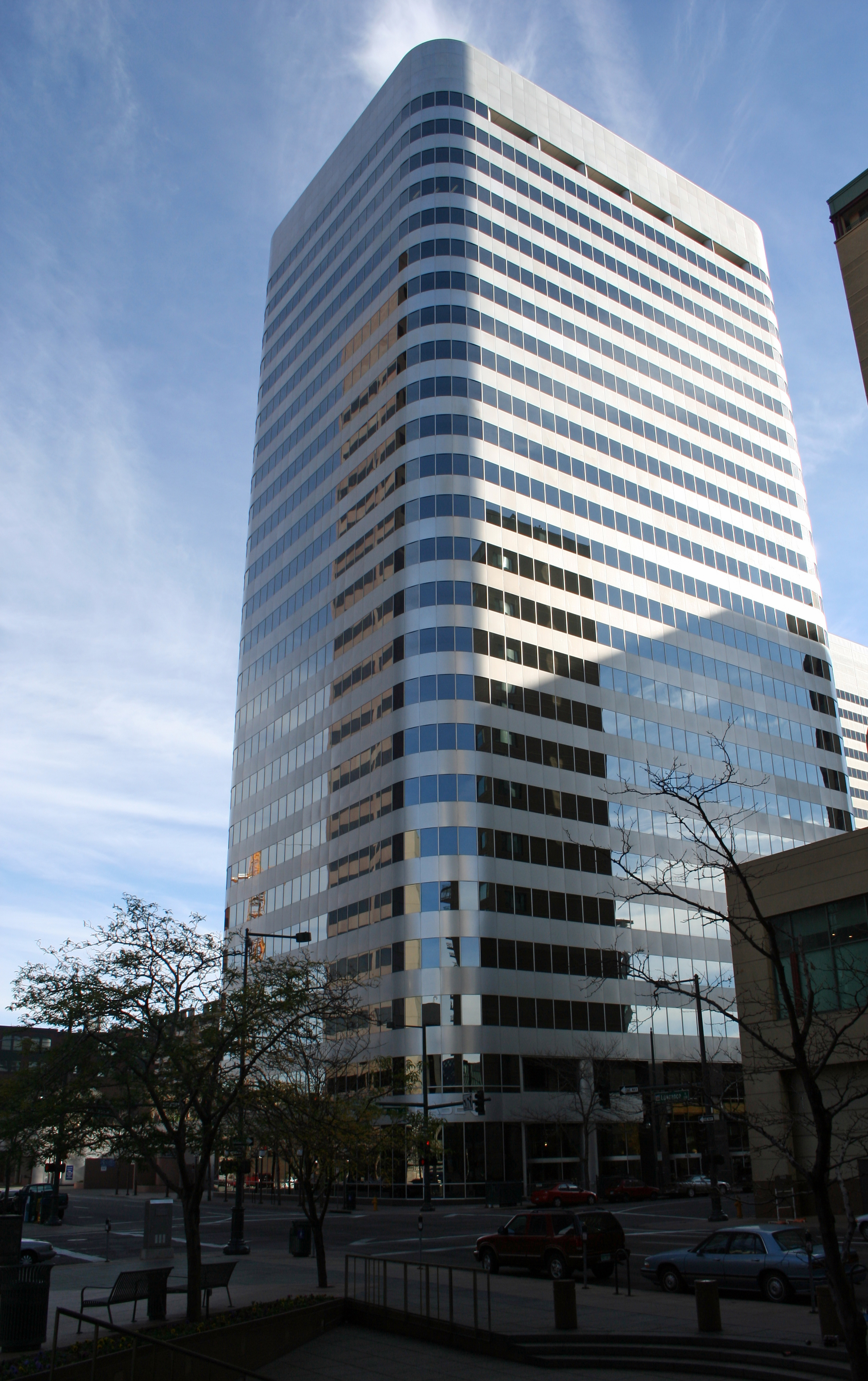
- 1125 17th Street, Denver, Colorado
- Interactive map of the 1125 17th Street area

General information
- Type: Office
- Location: 1125 17th Street, Denver, Colorado
- Completed: 1980

Height
- Roof: 363 ft (111 m)

Technical details
- Floor count: 25

1125 17th Street (formerly known as the Bank One Tower) is a 363 ft (111 m) tall skyscraper in Denver, Colorado. It was completed in 1980 and has 25 floors, making it the 29th tallest building in Denver.

== History ==
The building was designed by the prolific architecture firm Skidmore, Owings & Merrill. The building was formerly known as the Bank One Tower, and in even earlier times, the Amoco Building, since Standard Oil once leased a significant part of the building. When JPMorgan Chase and Bank One merged, the building's name changed to the Chase Tower. Now, according to the building's web site, the building's current name is simply its address, 1125 17th Street.

In 2017, the ownership shifted several times.

== See also ==
- List of tallest buildings in Denver
