= 1999 Broadway =

46-story high-rise office building in the city of Denver, Colorado

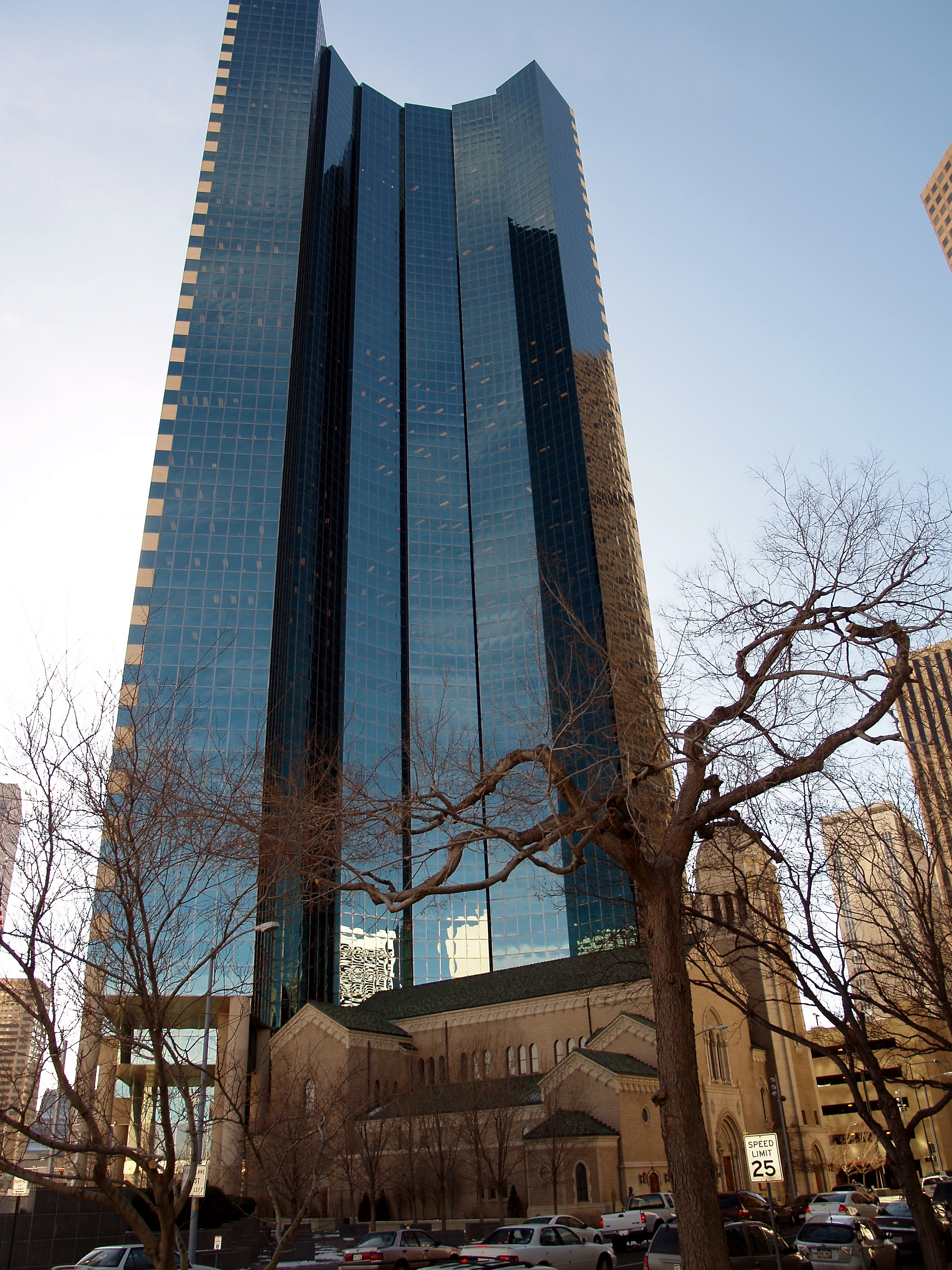
- 1999 Broadway
- Interactive map of the 1999 Broadway area

General information
- Type: Office
- Location: 1999 Broadway, Denver, Colorado
- Coordinates: 39.747759°N 104.987798°W
- Completed: 1985

Height
- Roof: 548 ft (167 m)

Technical details
- Floor count: 43
- Floor area: 635,727 ft^{2} (59,061.0 m^{2})

Design and construction
- Architect: Fentress Architects
- Structural engineer: Severud Associates Consulting Engineers
- Main contractor: Hensel Phelps Construction Co.

Website
- 1999broadway.com

1999 Broadway is a 46-story high-rise office building in the city of Denver, Colorado. The building was designed by Curtis W. Fentress, FAIA, RIBA of Fentress Architects and its construction was completed in 1985. It stands at a height of 548 ft (166m), making it the 6th tallest building in Denver. 1999 Broadway has a unique shape, it is shaped like a triangle with a scoop in the side. This is caused by the desire to retain the historical Holy Ghost Catholic Church at the base.

== See also ==
- List of tallest buildings in Denver
