= 1600 Glenarm Place =

Skyscraper in Denver, Colorado

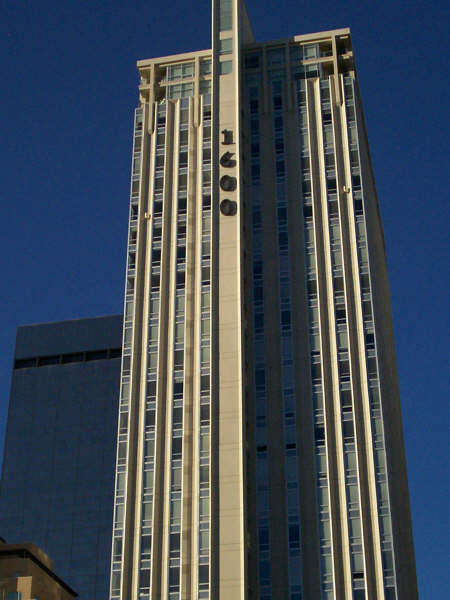
- 1600 Glenarm Place
- Interactive map of the 1600 Glenarm Place area

General information
- Status: Completed
- Type: Residential
- Location: 1600 Glenarm Place, Denver, Colorado
- Coordinates: 39°44′38″N 104°59′23″W
- Completed: 1967
- Owner: Northland Investment Corporation
- Management: Northland Glenarm, LLC.

Height
- Roof: 384 ft (117 m)

Technical details
- Floor count: 31

Design and construction
- Architect: Davis Partnership

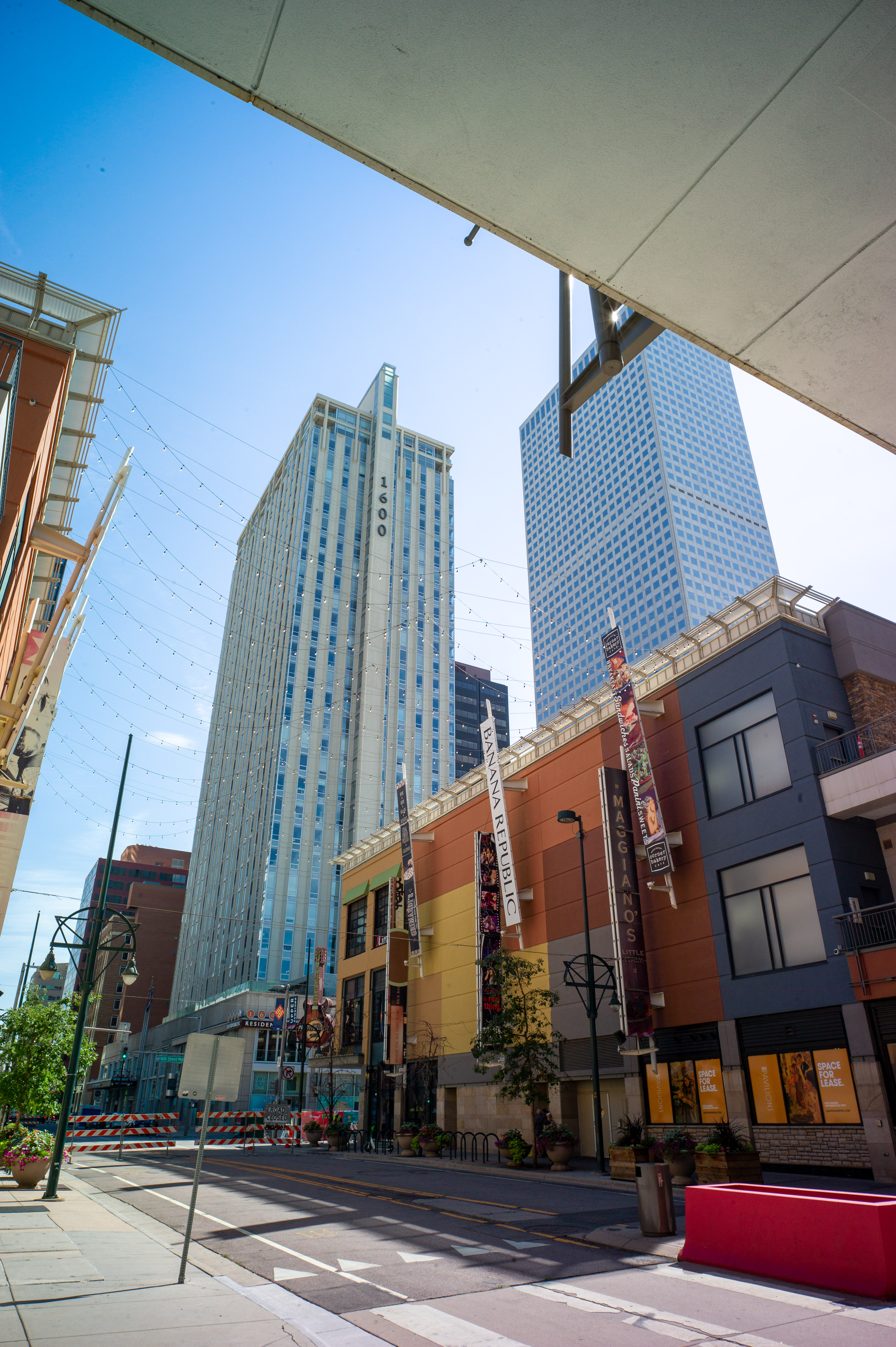
1600 Glenarm

1600 Glenarm Place is a 384 ft (117m) tall skyscraper in Denver, Colorado. Originally constructed in 1967 as the Security Life Building - it has since been converted into a multi-tenant luxury apartment complex. On the top floor of this building many years ago; there was a restaurant called Top Of The Rockies. The exterior of the building used to hold a separate elevator shaft for a glass elevator which served the restaurant. The restaurant has been gone for many years. After operating for many years as an office building, in 2006, the Security Life Building underwent a major conversion to residential use. 1600 Glenarm Place is in the heart of Downtown Denver. The high-rise sits on the corner of 16th Street Mall and Glenarm Place, next to the Denver Pavilions.

The building houses 333 units, with a large scale amenity overhaul having been completed in 2011, to include a fitness center, movie theater, large outdoor terrace, demonstration kitchen, conference room and game room. It shares the title as 21st tallest building in Denver with two other buildings. It is currently owned by the Northland Investment Corporation, under a subsidiary - Northland Glenarm, LLC after previous owner Plant Holdings NA, Inc. sold the building in 2018.

== See also ==
- List of tallest buildings in Denver
