= 1670 Broadway =

Skyscraper in Denver, Colorado

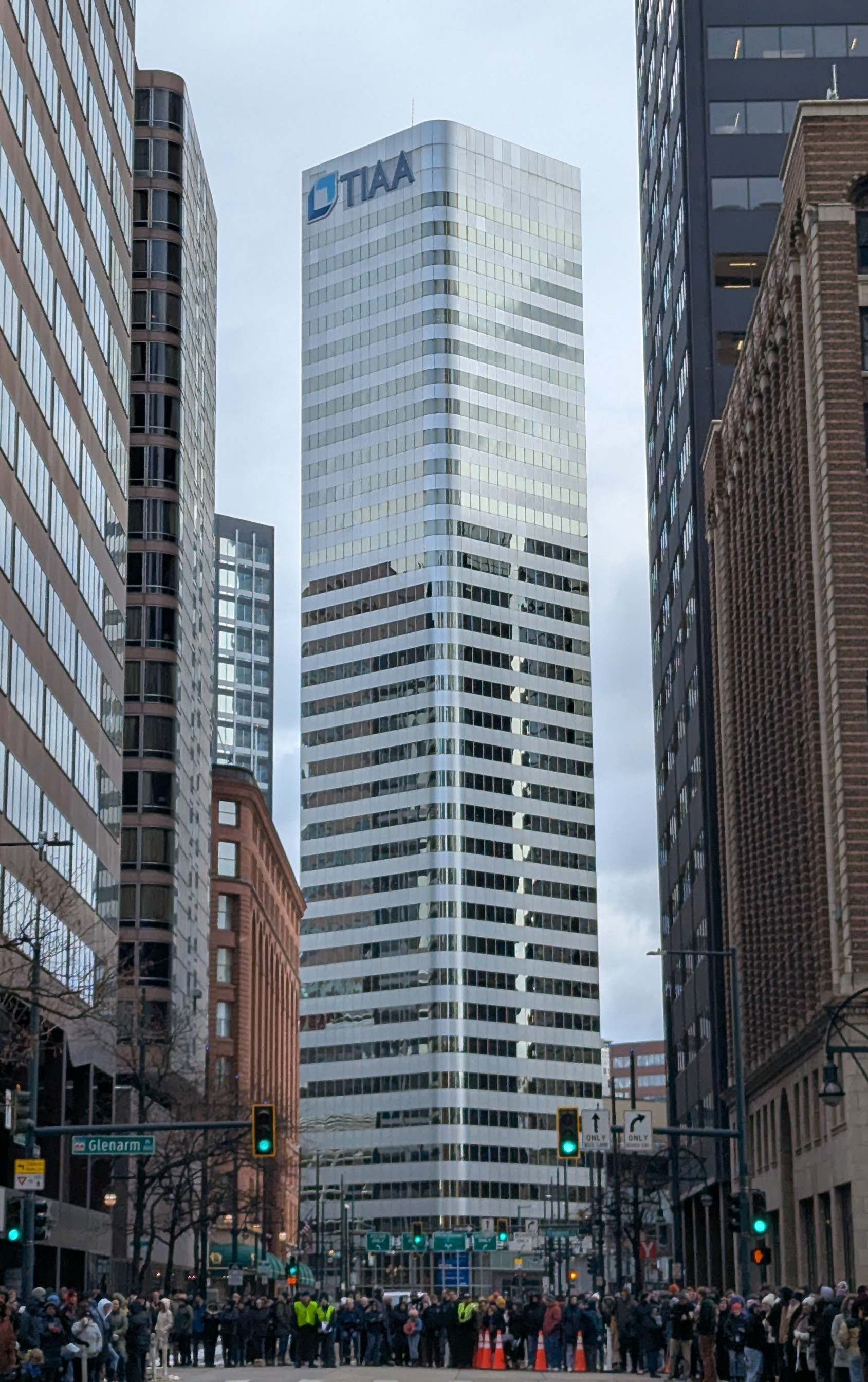
- 1670 Broadway in Denver CO looking south east down 17th st.
- Interactive map of the 1670 Broadway area

General information
- Location: 1670 North Broadway, Denver, Colorado
- Coordinates: 39.742921°N 104.986838°W
- Completed: 1980
- Owner: Hana Financial Group

Height
- Roof: 448 feet (137 m)

Technical details
- Floor count: 36
- Floor area: 697,200 sq ft (64,770 m^{2})

Design and construction
- Architect: Kohn Pedersen Fox Associates PC

1670 Broadway, formerly Amoco Tower, is a 448 feet (137 m) tall skyscraper in Denver, Colorado. It was completed in 1980 and has 36 floors. Kohn Pedersen Fox Associates PC designed the building and it is the 11th tallest skyscraper in Denver.

The 1670 Broadway building features, along with the tenants, a Starbucks coffee shop, a Russell's Convenient Store, and a UMB Bank. UBS purchased the building in 1990. In 2006, TIAA-CREF became one of the building's biggest tenants, and the company's symbol now adorns the top of the structure.

In August 2018, Korean asset manager Hana Financial Group acquired the building for $238 million. The company received $78 million in CMBS financing from UBS and $64.8 million in mezzanine financing to fund the acquisition.

== See also ==
- List of tallest buildings in Denver
