= United Western Financial Center =

High-rise office building located at 700 17th Street in the city Denver, Colorado

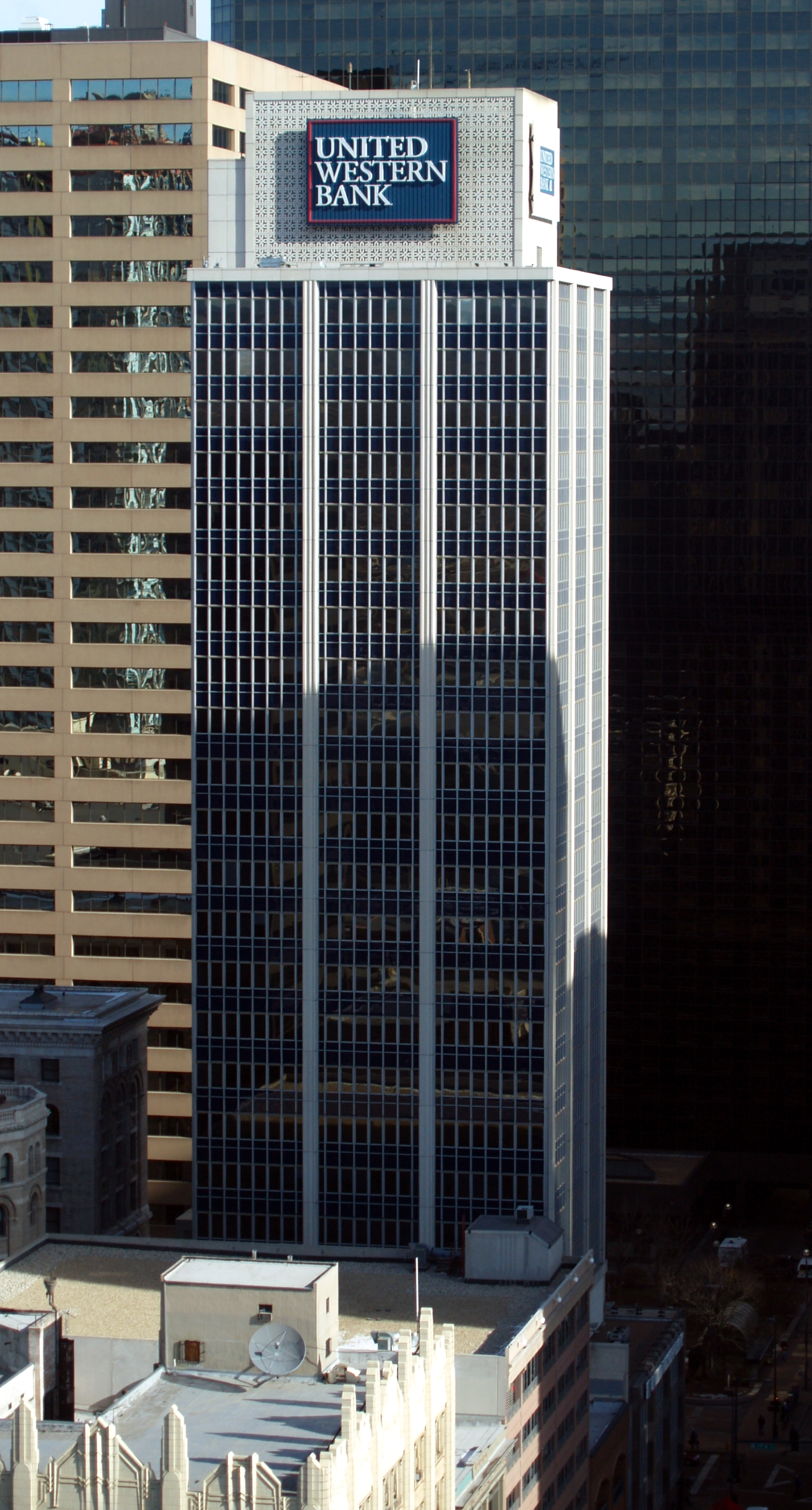
- Interactive map of the United Western Financial Center area

General information
- Status: Completed
- Type: Office
- Location: 700 17th Street, Denver, Colorado
- Coordinates: 39°44′46″N 104°59′29″W
- Completed: 1961

Height
- Roof: 357 ft (109 m)

Technical details
- Floor count: 24

United Western Financial Center is a 357 ft (109m) tall high-rise office building located at 700 17th Street in the city Denver, Colorado. It was completed in 1961 and has 24 floors. It is the 28th tallest building in Denver. It was designed by the architecture firm Raymond Harry Ervin & Associates in the modernist style.

== See also ==
- List of tallest buildings in Denver
