= 1600 Broadway =

High-rise office building in the city of Denver, Colorado

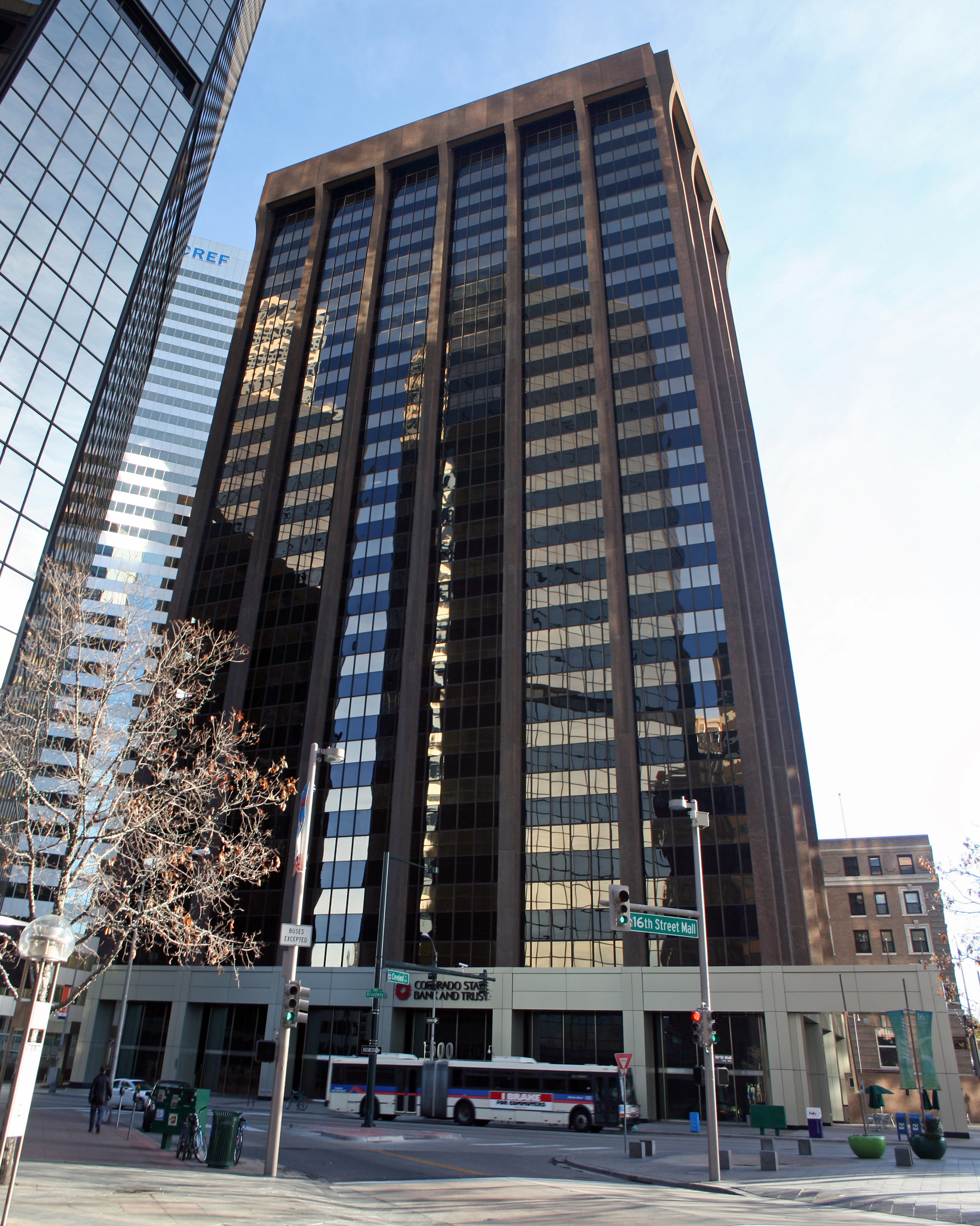
- The 1600 Broadway Building in Denver, Colorado
- Interactive map of the 1600 Broadway area

General information
- Type: Office
- Location: 1600 Broadway, Denver, Colorado
- Coordinates: 39°44′32″N 104°59′13″W
- Completed: 1972
- Owner: Nuveen Real Estate

Height
- Roof: 352 feet (107 m)

Technical details
- Floor count: 26
- Floor area: 445,000 square feet (41,300 m^{2})

Design and construction
- Architect: RNL Design

1600 Broadway (also known as the Colorado State Bank Building) is a high-rise office building in the city of Denver, Colorado. The tower stands at a height of 352 feet (107 m), and comprises 26 floors. The building was designed by architecture firm RNL Design, and its construction was completed in 1972. Upon its completion, 1600 Broadway stood as the seventh-tallest building in Denver. It is currently ranked as the 30th-tallest building in Denver. BOK Financial Corporation, formerly the Colorado State Bank, is located at the building. In January 2019, Nuveen Real Estate purchased the building for $111 million.

== See also ==
- List of tallest buildings in Denver
