= 1900 Lawrence =

Office skyscraper in Denver, Colorado

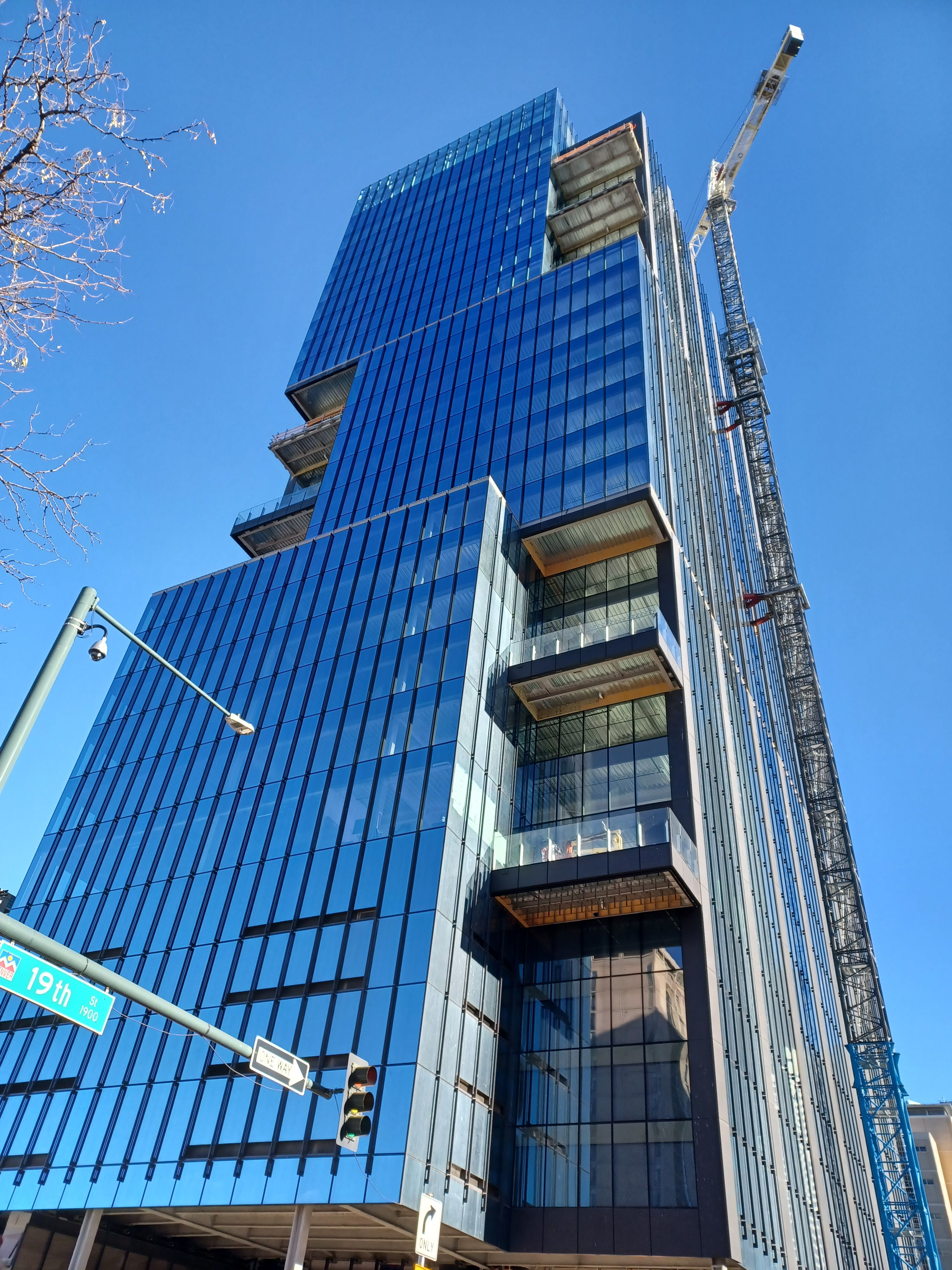
- 1900 Lawrence under construction in October 2023
- Interactive map of 1900 Lawrence

General information
- Status: Completed
- Type: Office
- Location: 1900 Lawrence Street, Denver, Colorado
- Coordinates: 39.7520°N 104.9960°W
- Completed: 2024
- Height: 427 feet (130 m)

Technical details
- Floor count: 30
- Floor area: 700,000 sq ft (65,000 m^{2})

Design and construction
- Architect: Goettsch Partners
- Developer: Riverside Investment & Development
- Main contractor: Hensel Phelps

Website
- www.1900lawrence.com

1900 Lawrence is a high-rise office building in downtown Denver, Colorado. Completed in 2024, the 30-story tower rises approximately 427 feet (130 m) and contains more than 700,000 square feet (65,000 m^{2}) of office space. The building is located near Union Station and Coors Field in the city’s central business district.

== Design and construction ==
The project was developed by Riverside Investment & Development and designed by Goettsch Partners. The general contractor for the project was Hensel Phelps. Construction began in 2022 and was completed in 2024. The building utilizes a composite concrete and steel structural system and features a glass curtain-wall façade typical of contemporary office towers.

The building contains more than 700,000 square feet of Class A office space and includes ground-floor retail and on-site parking. Floorplates were designed to provide flexible office layouts and access to daylight and views of the surrounding city and the Front Range.

The project incorporated building systems intended to support modern workplace standards, including upgraded mechanical ventilation and tenant amenity spaces. Outdoor terraces are integrated into the design on select levels.

=== Sustainability ===
1900 Lawrence achieved LEED Platinum certification under the U.S. Green Building Council’s BD+C: Core and Shell rating system.

== See also ==
- List of tallest buildings in Denver
