= List of tallest buildings in Denver =

Skyline of Denver
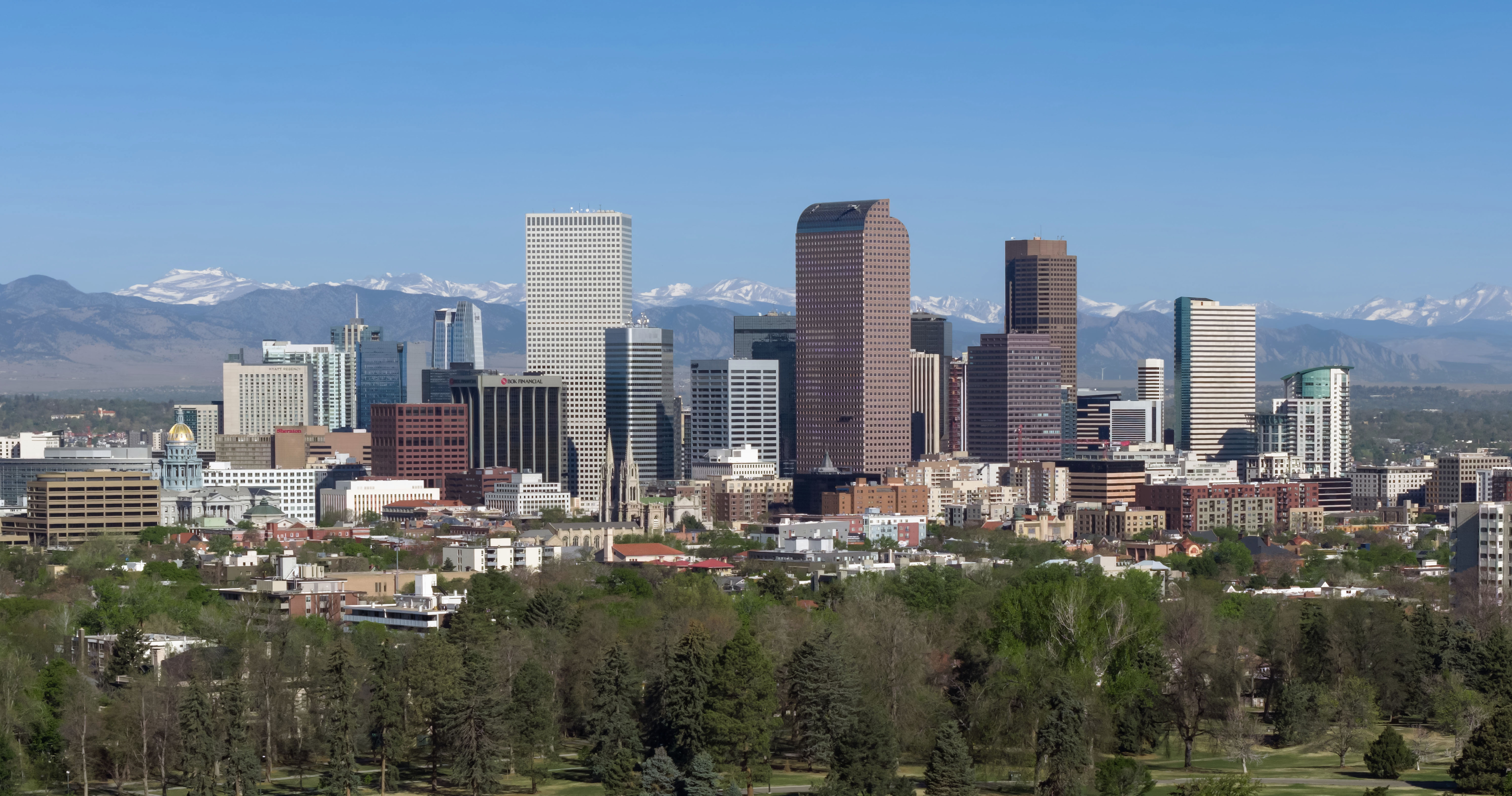
- Downtown Denver in 2026
- Tallest building: Republic Plaza (1984)
- Tallest building height: 714 ft (217.6 m)
- First 150 m+ building: 555 17th Street (1978)

Number of tall buildings (2026)
- Taller than 100 m (328 ft): 41
- Taller than 150 m (492 ft): 8
- Taller than 200 m (656 ft): 3

Number of tall buildings — feet
- Taller than 300 ft (91.4 m): 49

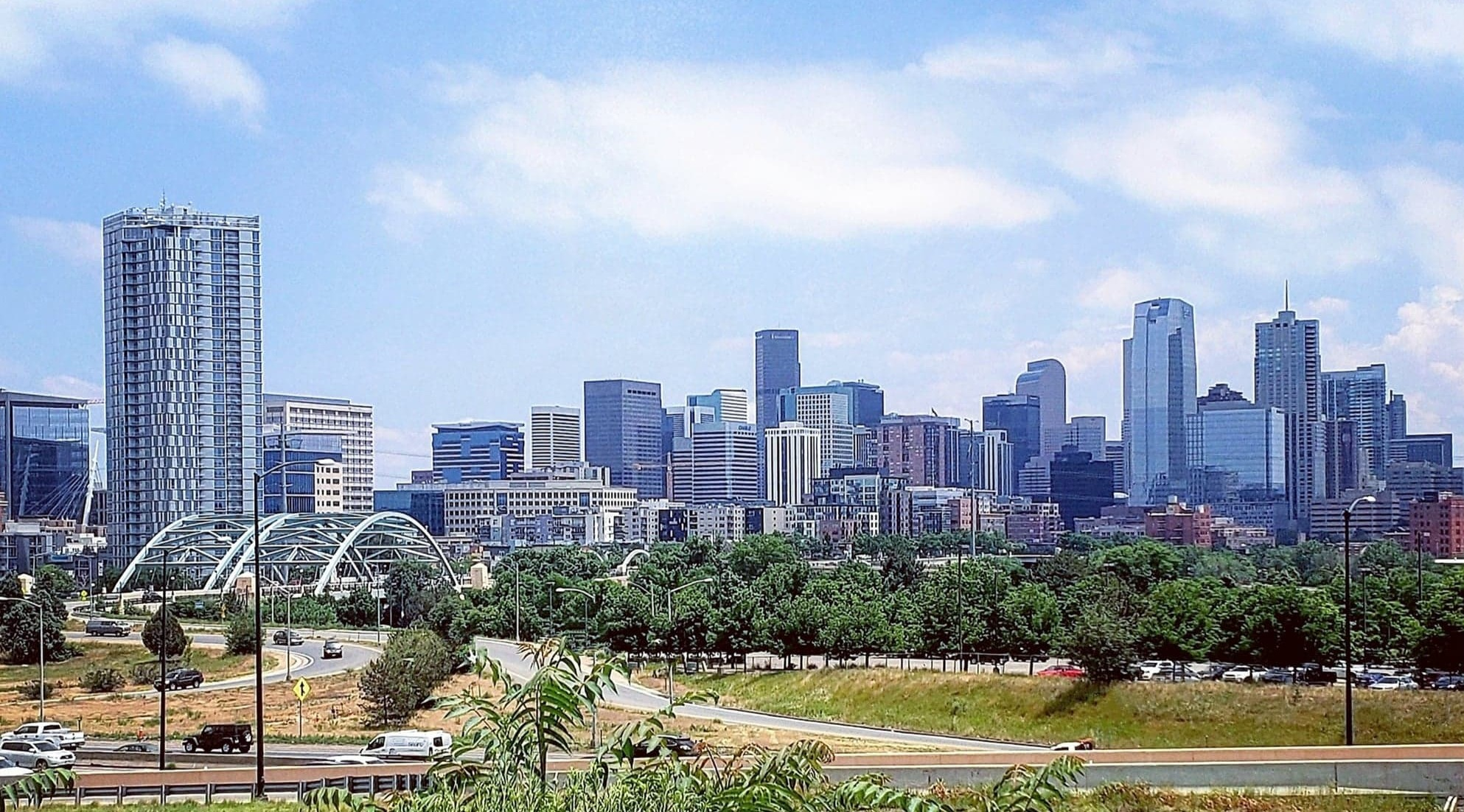
Denver's skyline from Speer Boulevard in 2020

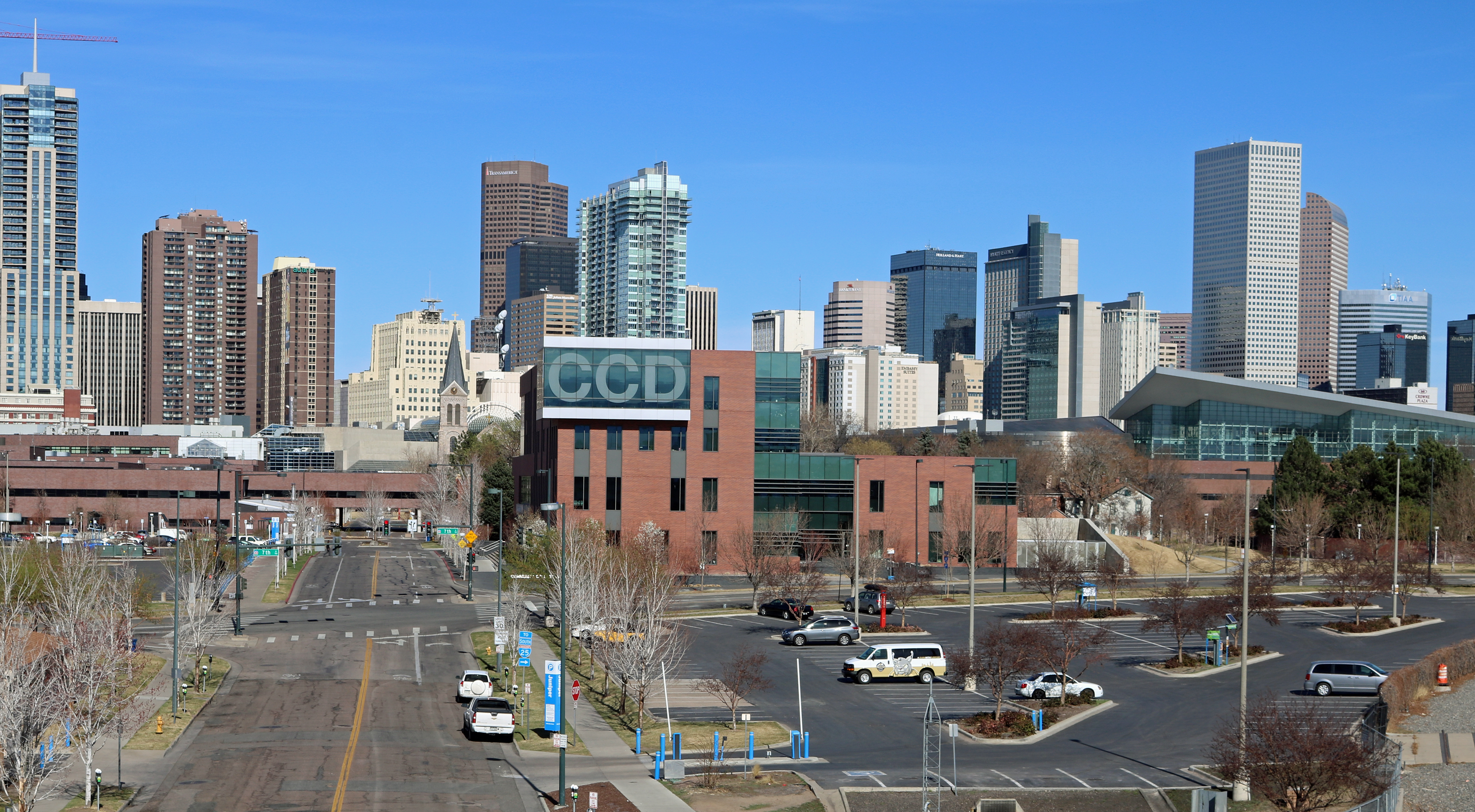
Denver's skyline, as seen from downtown, in 2017

Denver is the capital and largest city of the U.S state of Colorado, with a metropolitan area population of 3 million. Denver is home to more than 300 high-rise buildings, 49 of which have a height greater than 300 feet (91 meters) as of 2026. Denver has one of the largest skylines in the Mountain states, with the second greatest number of skyscrapers taller than 492 ft (150 m) after Las Vegas, having eight such buildings. Since 1984, the tallest building in the city is Republic Plaza, a 714-foot (218 m) office skyscraper. It is the tallest building in Colorado. The second-tallest building, 1801 California Street, is 709 ft (216 m) tall, only five feet shorter than Republic Plaza.

The history of skyscrapers in Denver began with the completion of the Equitable Building in 1892; this building, rising 143 feet (44 m) and nine floors, was the first high-rise in Denver. The 20-story Daniels & Fisher Tower became the tallest building between the Mississippi River and the state of California when it was built in 1910. At 325 ft (99 m), it surpassed the tip of the Colorado State Capitol, which was completed less than a decade earlier in 1901. A few more high-rises were built in Denver during the Roaring Twenties, including the AT&T Building in 1929, before the Great Depression put skyscraper development on hold until the 1950s. The city's skyline grew to greater heights during the 1960s and 1970s; oil and gas companies occupied office space in downtown skyscrapers during the concurrent energy boom.

Denver's skyline would see its greatest period of growth in the late 1970s and early 1980s, as the 1970s energy crisis led to a surge in oil and gas prices. From 1974 to 1984, the title of Denver's tallest building changed hands five times. All three of Denver's buildings taller than 650 ft (198 m) were completed between 1982 and 1984: Republic Plaza, 1801 California Street, and Wells Fargo Center, popularly called the "Cash Register Building" for the shape of its roof. Energy prices declined in the 1980s oil glut, abruptly halting Denver's skyscraper boom as vacancy rates increased and the city's population declined. High-rise construction resumed in the 2000s, with major projects such as Four Seasons Hotel Denver and 1144 Fifteenth, the city's fourth and fifth-tallest buildings, while the downtown skyline is expanding northwards towards the Ballpark and RiNo districts.

Most of the city's tallest buildings are located in Downtown Denver. Skyscrapers in downtown are mainly oriented in the area's diagonal grid–with the exception of buildings in North Capitol Hill–as opposed to the rest of the city. There is a smaller and much shorter concentration of residential towers in Cherry Creek, southeast of downtown, and even smaller clusters in Speer and east of Cheesman Park. The Denver Technological Center has several commercial high-rises that are shared between the city and Greenwood Village, a municipality in the metropolitan area. However, the tallest building in the Denver MSA outside of Denver itself is the Rocky Mountain Tower in Glendale, which is 325 ft (99 m) tall.

== History ==
Number of buildings by height in Denver by the end of each year, based on the information in this article. Click on the legend to toggle a specific height on or off. View chart definition.

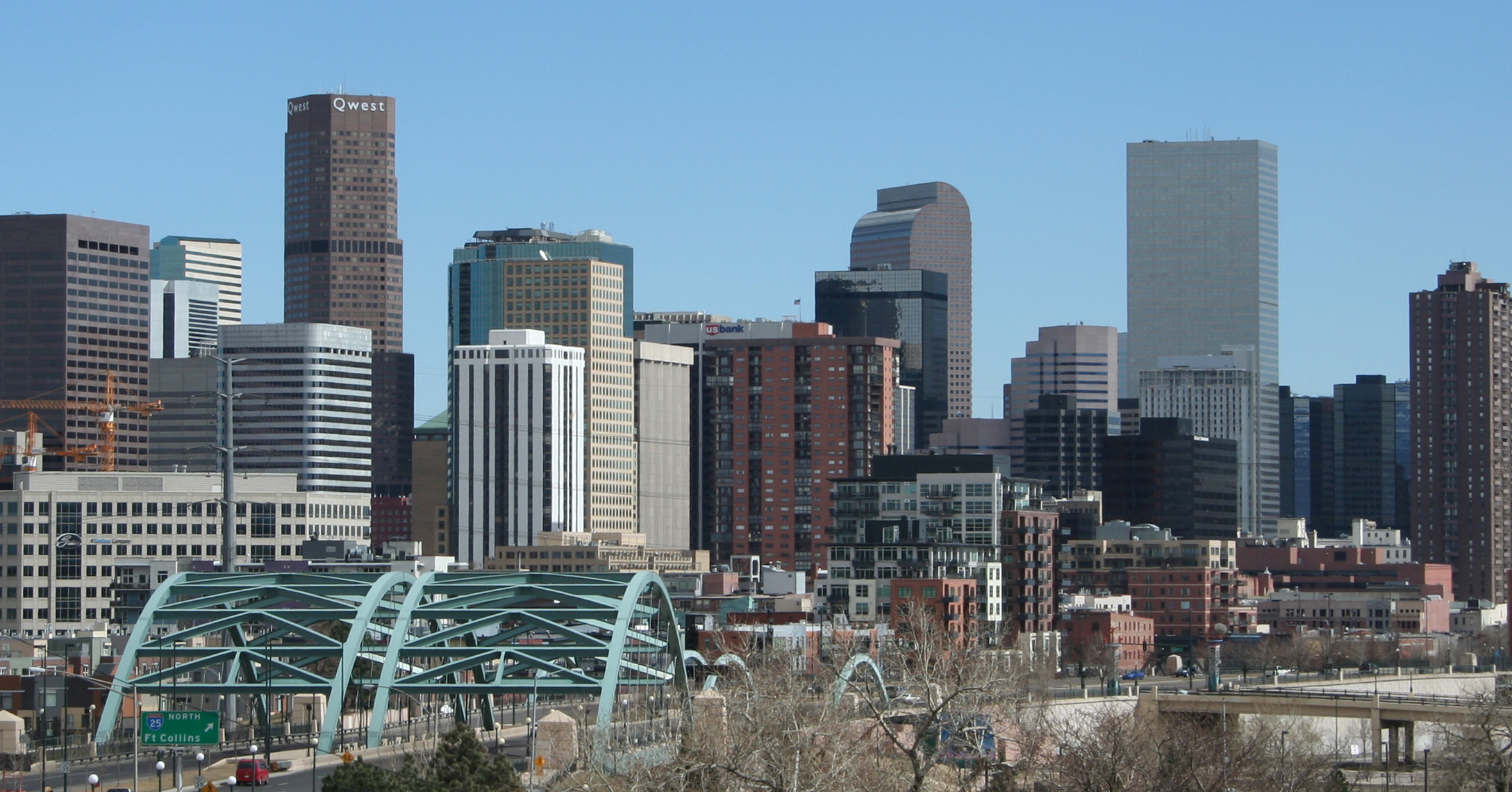
Skyline of Denver in 2006 (Use cursor to identify buildings.)

The history of skyscrapers in Denver began with the completion of the Equitable Building in 1892; this building, rising 143 feet (44 m) and nine floors, was the first high-rise in Denver. The title of the city's "first skyscraper" is usually given to the Daniels & Fisher Tower, which rises 325 feet (99 m) and was completed in 1910. The city went through a large building boom that lasted from the early 1970s to the mid-1980s. During this time, 21 of the city's 27 tallest buildings were constructed, including Republic Plaza, 1801 California Street, and the Wells Fargo Center. The city is the site of eight skyscrapers over 492 feet (150 m) in height, including two which rank among the tallest in the United States. Overall, the skyline of Denver is ranked (based upon existing and under construction buildings over 492 feet (150 m) tall) second in the Mountain States (after Las Vegas) and seventeenth in the United States.^{[A]}

The tallest building recently completed in Denver is the Four Seasons Hotel and Tower, which rises 45 stories and 641 feet (195 m). It now stands as the fourth-tallest building in Denver as well as the city's tallest residential tower. The 1144 Fifteenth office tower rises just over 600 feet at over 40 stories making it the fifth-tallest building in Denver upon completion early 2018. As of the mid-2020s, Denver has been experiencing a high rise residential building boom for shorter towers with several large projects having been built or under construction throughout the city, mainly concentrated in the Downtown Denver, Golden Triangle and River North (RiNo) neighborhoods.

== Cityscape ==
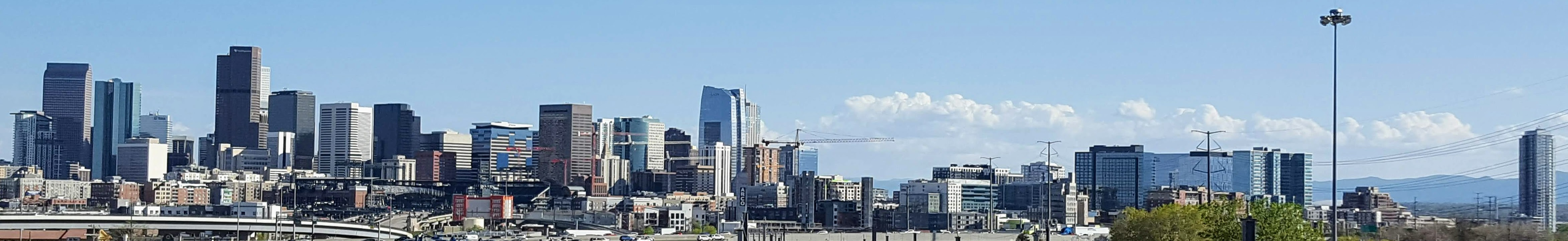
Denver skyline from 41st and Fox station bridge, May 2019

== Map of tallest buildings ==
The map below shows the location of buildings taller than 300 feet (91 m) in Downtown Denver. Each marker is numbered by the building's height rank, and colored by the decade of its completion. Of the buildings taller than 300 feet (91 m) in Denver, three are not visible on the map: the Country Club Twin Towers in Country Club, and The Pinnacle at City Park South Tower, immediately south of City Park.

Buildings taller than 300 ft (91 m) in Downtown Denver. An asterisk (*) next to the building's name indicates it is located outside the map.
- 1950s and before
- 1960s
- 1970s
- 1980s
- 1990s
- 2000s
- 2010s
- 2020s
1 Republic Plaza
2 1801 California Street
3 Wells Fargo Center
4 Four Seasons Hotel Denver
5 1144 Fifteenth
6 1999 Broadway
7 707 17th Street
8 555 17th Street
9 Hyatt Regency Denver at the Colorado Convention Center
10 Spire
11 Block 162
12 1670 Broadway
13 17th Street Plaza
14 633 17th Street
15 1900 Lawrence
16 Brooks Tower
17 Denver Place South Tower
18 One Tabor Center
19 Johns Manville Plaza
20 Granite Tower
21 Ritz-Carlton Denver
22 U.S. Bank Tower
23 621 17th Street
24 1600 Glenarm Place
25 Denver Financial Center I
26 One Lincoln Park
27 The Confluence
28 Dominion Plaza
29 Lincoln Center
30 1125 17th Street
31 United Western Financial Center
32 Denver Energy Center Tower II
33 1600 Broadway
34 The Curtis
35 1800 Larimer
36 410 Building
37 Larimer Place
38 Denver Energy Center Tower I
39 1001 17th Street
40 Country Club East Tower*
41 Country Club West Tower*
42 Daniels & Fisher Tower
43 Independence Plaza
44 Grand Hyatt Denver
45 The Quincy
46 The Barclay
47 One Civic Center Plaza
48 The Pinnacle at City Park South Tower*
49 1401 Lawrence

== Tallest buildings ==
This lists ranks buildings in Denver that stand at least 300 feet (91 m) tall as of 2026, based on standard height measurement. This includes spires and architectural details but does not include antenna masts. The "Year" column indicates the year in which a building was completed. Buildings tied in height are sorted by year of completion with earlier buildings ranked first, and then alphabetically.

Was the tallest building in Denver upon completion

| Rank | Name | Image | Location | Height ft (m) | Floors | Year | Purpose | Notes |
|---|---|---|---|---|---|---|---|---|
| 1 | Republic Plaza | | 39°44′36″N 104°59′19″W | 714 (217.6) | 56 | 1984 | Office | Tallest building in Denver and Colorado since 1984. Tallest building in the Mountain states. Tallest building completed in Denver in the 1980s. |
| 2 | 1801 California Street | | 39°44′52″N 104°59′23″W | 709 (216.1) | 53 | 1982 | Office | Tallest building in Denver and Colorado upon completed in 1983 until it was surpassed by the Republic Plaza building in 1984. The roof houses an antenna mast; with this structure included, the building reaches to a total height of 738 feet (225 m). When measuring by pinnacle height this building (arguably) remains the tallest building in Denver, Colorado. The exteriors of the building were used as the setting for Colbyco in the television series Dynasty |
| 3 | Wells Fargo Center | | 39°44′37″N 104°59′08″W | 698 (212.8) | 52 | 1983 | Office | Nicknamed "the Cash Register" because of its unique crown. |
| 4 | Four Seasons Hotel Denver | | 39°44′47″N 104°59′53″W | 639 (194.8) | 45 | 2010 | Mixed-use | Mixed-use residential and hotel building; there are 24 residential floors atop 21 hotel floors (239 rooms & suites). Topped off in September 2009. When measured to the roof of the structure, Four Seasons Tower rises to around 565 feet. The spire is 75 feet tall. |
| 5 | 1144 Fifteenth | | 39°44′49″N 104°59′52″W | 602 (183.6) | 42 | 2018 | Office | Topped off July 2017 and completed in March 2018. Located on the same block as the Four Seasons tower, which by pinnacle height is just 24 feet taller. 1144 Fifteenth is the tallest office building built in Denver in more than 30 years at the time of completion. Headquarters of information security company Optiv. |
| 6 | 1999 Broadway | | 39°44′52″N 104°59′16″W | 544 (165.8) | 43 | 1985 | Office | Built around the historic Holy Ghost Church. |
| 7 | 707 17th Street | | 39°44′49″N 104°59′25″W | 522 (159.1) | 42 | 1981 | Mixed-use | Briefly the tallest building in Denver from 1981 to 1982. Mixed-use office and hotel building. Formerly known as MCI Plaza. |
| 8 | 555 17th Street | | 39°44′43″N 104°59′21″W | 507 (154.5) | 40 | 1978 | Office | Briefly the tallest building in Denver from 1978 to 1981. Tallest building completed in Denver in the 1970s. |
| 9 | Hyatt Regency Denver at the Colorado Convention Center | | 39°44′37″N 104°59′37″W | 489 (149) | 37 | 2005 | Hotel | Tallest all-hotel building in Denver. Contains 1,100 rooms (60 suites). Currently Denver's 2nd largest hotel by room/suite count. |
| 10 | Spire | | 39°44′41″N 104°59′45″W | 483 (147.2) | 41 | 2009 | Residential | Topped off in March 2009. Home to 496 residential units. Tallest all residential building in Denver and Colorado. |
| 11 | Block 162 | | 39°44′39″N 104°59′34″W | 452 (137.8) | 30 | 2021 | Office | Topped off in 2020. Contains 595,000 square feet of office space. Completed and opened in early 2021. Tallest building completed in Denver in the 2020s. |
| 12 | 1670 Broadway | | 39°44′34″N 104°59′12″W | 448 (136.6) | 34 | 1980 | Office | |
| 13 | 17th Street Plaza | | 39°45′01″N 104°59′43″W | 438 (133.5) | 32 | 1982 | Office | |
| 14 | 633 17th Street | | 39°44′48″N 104°59′24″W | 434 (132.3) | 32 | 1974 | Office | Tallest building in Denver from 1974 to 1978. Formerly known as First Interstate Tower North. Exteriors of the building were used as the setting for Denver-Carrington in the television series Dynasty. |
| 15 | 1900 Lawrence | | 39°45′05″N 104°59′32″W | 427 (130.2) | 30 | 2024 | Office | Contains over 700,000 square feet of usable office space. 1900 Lawrence is located on the north end of Denver's CBD and just a few blocks from Coors Field. |
| 16 | Brooks Tower | | 39°44′47″N 104°59′48″W | 420 (128) | 42 | 1968 | Residential | Tallest building in Denver from 1968 to 1974. Tallest building completed in Denver in the 1960s. |
| 17 | Denver Place South Tower | | 39°44′57″N 104°59′31″W | 416 (126.8) | 34 | 1981 | Office | |
| 18 | One Tabor Center | | 39°44′57″N 104°59′47″W | 408 (124.4) | 32 | 1984 | Office | |
| 19 | Johns Manville Plaza | | 39°44′49″N 104°59′28″W | 404 (123.1) | 29 | 1978 | Office | |
| 20 | Granite Tower | | 39°44′58″N 104°59′33″W | 398 (121.3) | 31 | 1983 | Office | |
| 21 | Ritz-Carlton Denver | | 39°45′01″N 104°59′31″W | 390 (118.9) | 38 | 1983 | Mixed-use | Mixed-use hotel and residential building. |
| 22 | U.S. Bank Tower | | 39°44′51″N 104°59′38″W | 389 (118.6) | 26 | 1975 | Office | |
| 23 | 621 17th Street | | 39°44′45″N 104°59′24″W | 385 (117.4) | 28 | 1957 | Office | Tallest building in Denver from 1957 to 1968. Tallest building completed in Denver in the 1950s. |
| 24 | 1600 Glenarm Place | | 39°44′38″N 104°59′23″W | 384 (117) | 32 | 1967 | Residential | Also known as Glenarm Plaza. Originally known as the Security Life building. |
| 25 | Denver Financial Center I | | 39°44′40″N 104°59′07″W | 374 (114) | 32 | 1981 | Office | |
| 26 | One Lincoln Park | | 39°44′52″N 104°59′12″W | 374 (114) | 32 | 2009 | Residential | |
| 27 | The Confluence | | 39°45′14″N 105°00′27″W | 371 (113) | 34 | 2017 | Residential | Topped off February 2017. Located at the western edge of the Lower Downtown (LoDo) neighborhood the 288-unit all residential tower is located adjacent to Confluence Park at the confluence of Cherry Creek and the South Platte River. |
| 28 | Dominion Plaza | | 39°44′43″N 104°59′27″W | 401 (122.2) | 28 | 1983 | Office | |
| 29 | Lincoln Center | | 39°44′35″N 104°59′09″W | 366 (111.6) | 30 | 1972 | Office | |
| 30 | 1125 17th Street | | 39°44′58″N 104°59′41″W | 363 (110.6) | 25 | 1980 | Office | |
| 31 | United Western Financial Center | | 39°44′46″N 104°59′29″W | 357 (108.8) | 24 | 1961 | Office | Also known as Matrix Capital Bank Tower. |
| 32 | Denver Energy Center Tower II | | 39°44′32″N 104°59′16″W | 357 (108.8) | 29 | 1980 | Office | Also known by its address, 1625 Broadway. The tallest of two towers at the Denver Energy Center, formerly the World Trade Center. |
| 33 | 1600 Broadway | | 39°44′32″N 104°59′13″W | 352 (107.3) | 26 | 1972 | Office | Also known as Colorado State Bank. |
| 34 | The Curtis | | 39°44′55″N 104°59′33″W | 350 (106.7) | 30 | 1974 | Mixed-use | Mixed-use hotel and residential building. Also known as Executive Tower. |
| 35 | 1800 Larimer | | 39°45′04″N 104°59′40″W | 344 (104.7) | 22 | 2010 | Office | |
| 36 | 410 Building | | 39°44′39″N 104°59′20″W | 335 (102.1) | 24 | 1978 | Office | |
| 37 | Larimer Place | | 39°44′57″N 104°59′53″W | 335 (102.1) | 32 | 1981 | Residential | |
| 38 | Denver Energy Center Tower I | | 39°44′34″N 104°59′16″W | 335 (102) | 29 | 1980 | Office | |
| 39 | 1001 17th Street | | 39°44′57″N 104°59′36″W | 330 (100.6) | 21 | 1977 | Office | |
| N/A | Elitch Gardens Observation Tower | | 39°45′03″N 105°00′39″W | 330 (100.6) | N/A | 1995 | Observation | Located inside Elitch Gardens Theme Park near Riverfront Park in Denver. Included in this list for comparative purposes. |
| 40 | Country Club East Tower | | 39°42′56″N 104°58′27″W | 328 (100) | 31 | 2017 | Residential | Topped off Spring 2017 with completion in late 2017. Located in Denver's Speer neighborhood adjacent to the Denver Country Club. There are a total of around 550 residential units within towers II & III. |
| 41 | Country Club West Tower | | 39°42′56″N 104°58′30″W | 328 (100) | 31 | 2017 | Residential | Topped off Spring 2017 with completion in late 2017. Located in Denver's Speer neighborhood adjacent to the Denver Country Club. There are a total of around 550 residential units within towers II & III. |
| N/A | Denver International Airport Tower | | 39°51′45″N 104°40′25″W | 327 (99.7) | N/A | 1993 | Transport | Included in this list for comparative purposes. |
| 42 | Daniels & Fisher Tower | | 39°44′53″N 104°59′44″W | 325 (99.1) | 20 | 1910 | Office | Located in Denver's Skyline Park, D&F Tower was the tallest building located west of the Mississippi River from 1910 until 1914, and was the tallest building in Denver from 1910 to 1957. Today the tower continues to house mostly office condominiums as well as an events venue on the upper floors and a cabaret in the basement. Standing near the center of the Sixteenth Street Mall, the Daniels & Fisher Tower remains a beloved Denver landmark. |
| 43 | Independence Plaza | | 39°44′53″N 104°59′39″W | 322 (98.2) | 24 | 1972 | Office | |
| 44 | Grand Hyatt Denver | | 39°44′46″N 104°59′21″W | 320 (97.5) | 26 | 1979 | Hotel | |
| 45 | The Quincy | | 39°44′55″N 104°59′33″W | 315 (96) | 28 | 2018 | Residential | Contains 359 residential units. |
| 46 | The Barclay | | 39°44′59″N 104°59′51″W | 314 (95.7) | 30 | 1981 | Residential | |
| 47 | One Civic Center Plaza | 1560 Broadway on the far rightz | 39°44′29″N 104°59′12″W | 310 (94.5) | 22 | 1984 | Office | Also known as the Denver Post Tower. |
| 48 | The Pinnacle at City Park South Tower | | 39°44′36″N 104°57′10″W | 305 (93) | 27 | 2008 | Residential | |
| 49 | 1401 Lawrence | | 39°44′50″N 104°59′56″W | 304 (92.7) | 22 | 2016 | Office | |

== Tallest under construction ==
There are two buildings under construction in Denver that are planned to be at least 300 ft (91 m) tall as of 2026, based on standard height measurement.

| Name | Height ft (m) | Floors | Year | Purpose | Notes |
|---|---|---|---|---|---|
| Upton Residences South Tower | 400 (121.9) | 38 | 2026 | Residential | Also known as 18th & Glenarm. |
| Upton Residences North Tower | 350 (106.7) | 32 | 2026 | Residential | Also known as 18th & Glenarm. |

== Timeline of tallest buildings ==
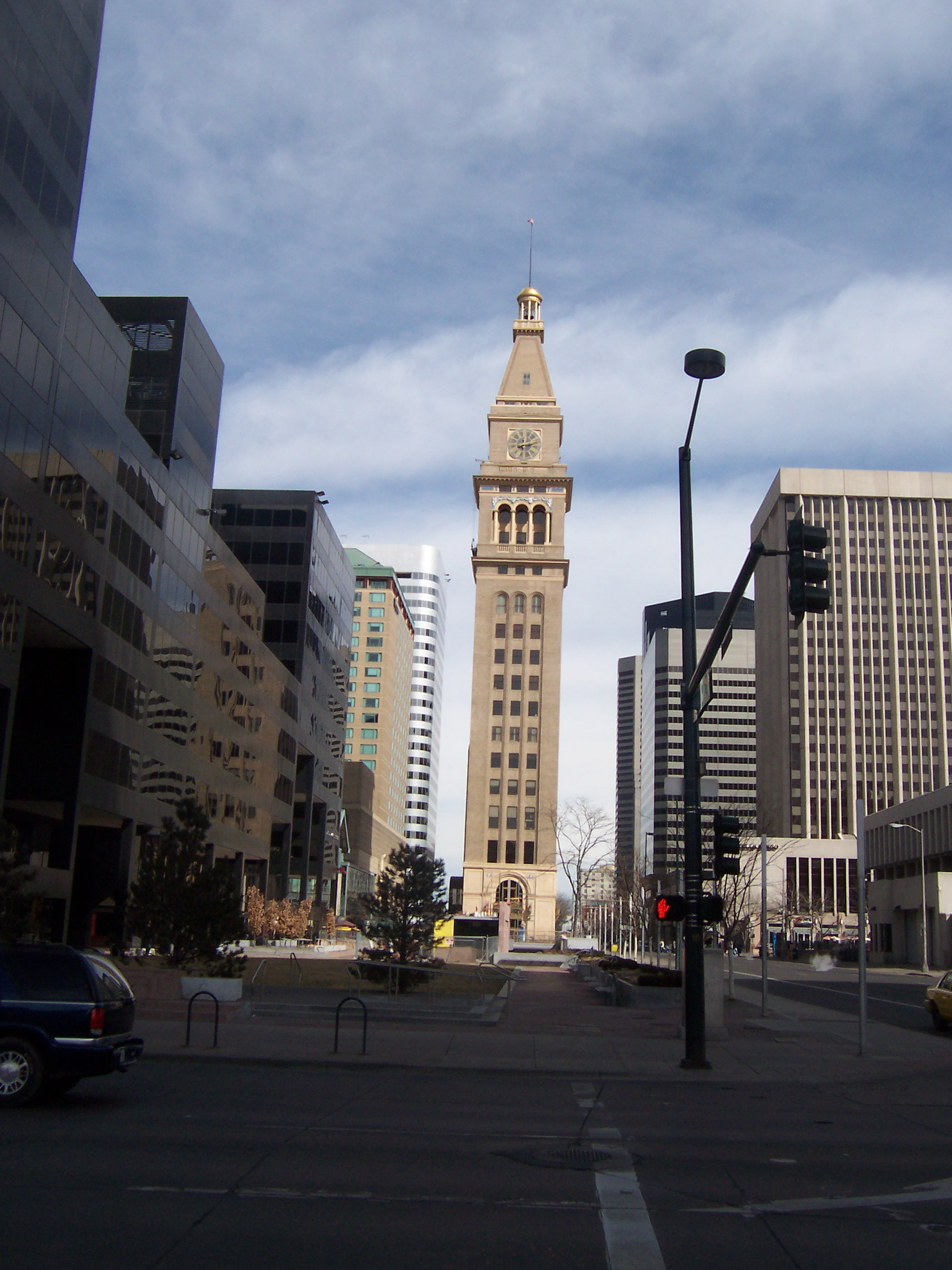
The Daniels & Fisher Tower stood as the tallest building in Denver from 1910 until 1957.

| Name | Image | Street address | Years as tallest | Height ft (m) | Floors | Reference |
|---|---|---|---|---|---|---|
| Equitable Building | | 730 17th Street | 1892–1910 | 148 (45) | 9 | |
| Daniels & Fisher Tower | | 1601 Arapahoe Street | 1910–1957 | 325 (99) | 20 | |
| 621 17th Street | | 621 17th Street | 1957–1968 | 384 (117) | 28 | |
| Brooks Tower | | 1020 15th Street | 1968–1974 | 420 (130) | 42 | |
| First Interstate Tower North | | 633 17th Street | 1974–1978 | 434 (132) | 32 | |
| 555 17th Street | | 555 17th Street | 1978–1981 | 507 (155) | 40 | |
| MCI Plaza | | 707 17th Street | 1981–1982 | 522 (159) | 42 | |
| 1801 California Street | | 1801 California Street | 1982–1984 | 709 (216) | 53 | |
| Republic Plaza | | 330 17th Street | 1984–present | 714 (218) | 56 | |

== See also ==
- List of tallest buildings in the United States
- Bibliography of Colorado
- Geography of Colorado
- History of Colorado
- Index of Colorado-related articles
- List of Colorado-related lists
- Outline of Colorado
