= Denver Place =

Office complex in Denver, Colorado

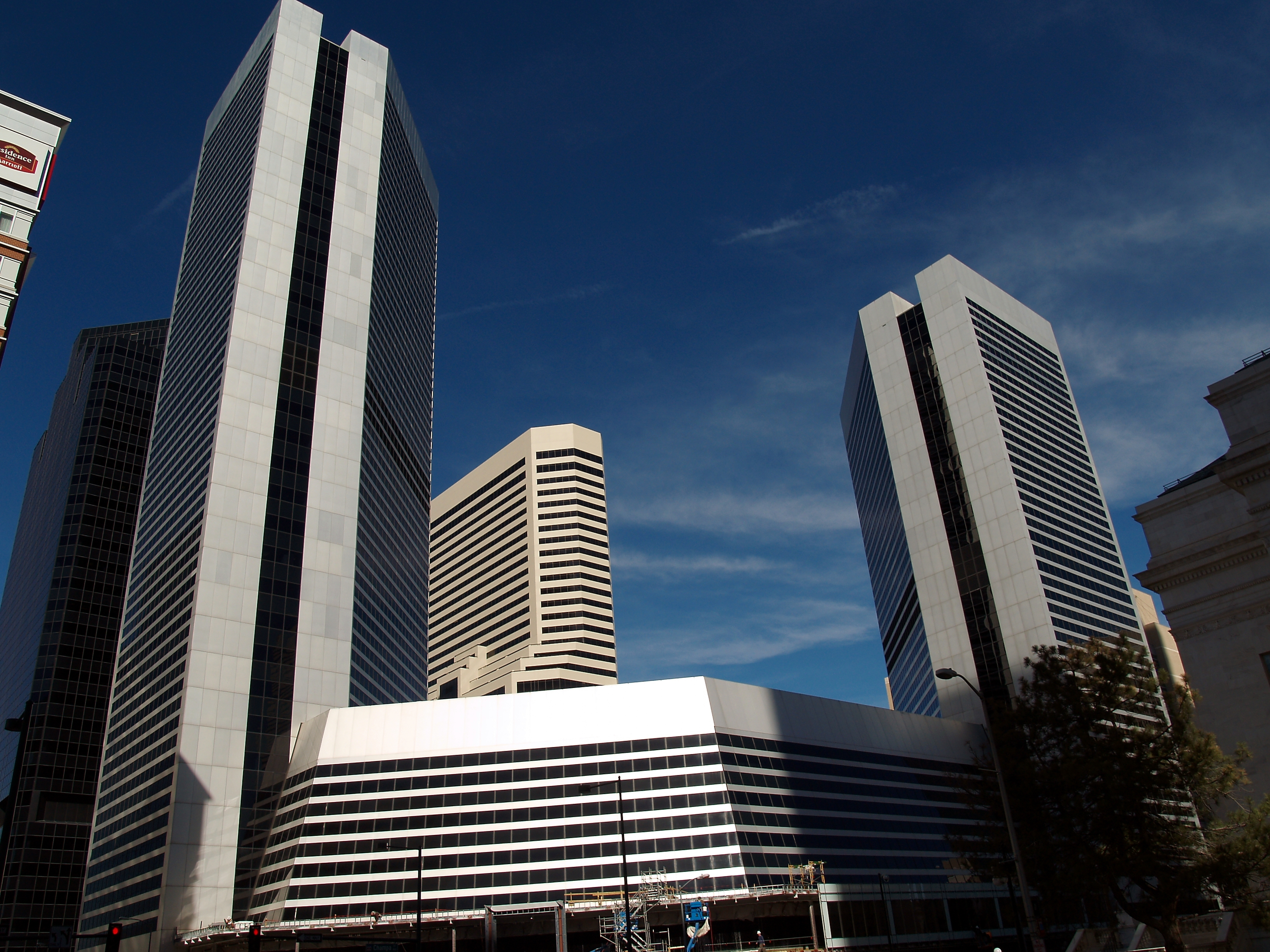
- The South Tower is the building on the left of the image

General information
- Status: Completed
- Type: Office
- Location: 999 18th Street, Denver, Colorado, United States
- Coordinates: 39°44′57″N 104°59′31″W
- Owner: Plant Holdings North America, Inc.

Design and construction
- Architect(s): Marvin E. Knedler & Assoc.
- Developer: Devco Property Inc.

Denver Place is an office and retail complex in the central business district of Denver, Colorado. The property contains over 1 million square feet of space and occupies an entire city block. It was developed and completed in 1981 by Devco Property Inc. from design by Marvin E. Knedler & Assoc. Architects, P.C. It is composed of the South Tower (34 stories and 416 feet (127 m) tall), North Tower (23 stories and 285 feet (87 m) tall), North Terrace (7 stories), and South Terrace (7 stories). The two towers are elongated hexagons made of silver gray aluminum panels contrasted by dark gray reflective glass. They sit diagonally from one another, connected by the Terraces to create a single structure which also has a bridge leading to the Ritz Carlton and Denver Place Apartments (also owned by Plant Holdings North America, Inc.). At the street level is a retail mall. The building has won many awards including the 2005 Denver Metro Building Owners And Managers Association Building of the Year Award in the Earth Award category and the Gold LEED-EB Label for its green design.

== See also ==
- List of tallest buildings in Denver
