= 707 17th Street =

Building in Colorado, United States

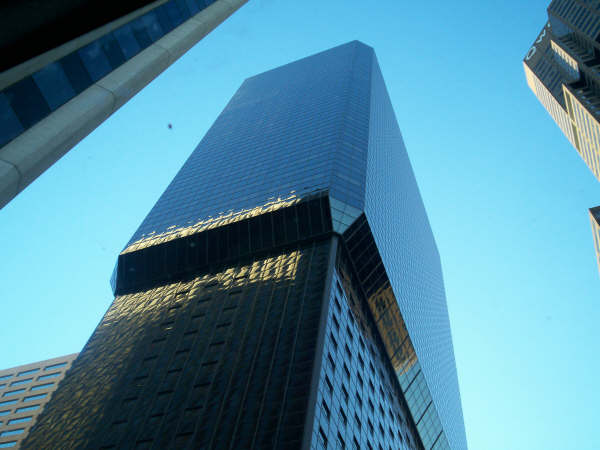
- Interactive map of the 707 17th Street area

General information
- Status: Completed
- Type: Office, Hotel
- Location: 707 17th Street, Denver, Colorado, United States
- Coordinates: 39.747056°N 104.990378°W
- Opening: 1981
- Owner: MCI Inc., Marriott International, Inc.

Height
- Roof: 522 ft (159 m)

Technical details
- Floor count: 42
- Floor area: 522,071 square feet (48,502 m^{2})

Design and construction
- Architects: Metz, Train & Youngren
- Developer: Crescent Real Estate Equities Company
- Main contractor: Del E. Webb Construction Company

Website
- www.brookfieldproperties.com/en/our-properties/city-center-707-17th-street-255.html

707 17th Street, formerly known as the MCI Building and Arco Tower, and now known as the Jacobs Building is a skyscraper in Denver, Colorado. The building was completed in 1981, and rises 42 floors and 522 feet (159 m) in height. The building stands as the seventh-tallest building in Denver as of 2018. It also stood as the tallest building in the city at the time of its 1981 completion, and held that distinction for two years until it was surpassed by the 709-foot (216 m) 1801 California Street in 1983.

707 17th Street was known as MCI Plaza until 2005; MCI Inc. filed for bankruptcy in 2002, and the company was subsequently acquired by Verizon Communications on February 14, 2005. Prior to its bankruptcy, MCI occupied the uppermost commercial floors of 707 17th Street, and served as the structure's primary tenant. However, even before MCI's acquirement, 707 17th Street stood partially vacant, and was nearing a 50% vacancy rate in 2002. This ended on September 30, 2002, when architectural, engineering and construction management firm Carter & Burgess (acquired in 2007 by Jacobs Engineering Group) signed a deal to lease 86,000 square feet (8,000 m^{2}) of office space. This deal was one of the largest office transactions in Denver in 2006. Jacobs has merged with CH2M Hill and has since merged into their headquarters in south Denver and no longer have their signage on the building.

While the upper 22 floors of the building contain office space, the lowest 20 floors of 707 17th Street contain a hotel that was originally known as the Denver Marriott City Center, but was renamed the Hilton Denver City Center on December 1, 2017. The hotel contains 613 guest rooms and suites. As the building consists of both commercial and hotel space, it is classified as a mixed use skyscraper.

707 17th Street has a somewhat unusual "setfront" design, rather than the usual setback found in other Denver skyscrapers such as 1801 California Street. The building bulges out and becomes wider at its 21st floor, and this widening is described as a "setfront". The narrower region at the bottom of the building is home to the Hilton hotel, whereas the upper, wider floors contain most of the commercial space. The building's façade is composed of black glass, and it is an example of international-style "black box" architecture.

== See also ==
- List of tallest buildings in Denver

Preceded by 555 17th Street	Tallest Building in Denver; 1981—1983; 159m	Succeeded by 1801 California Street
