= Ebbets Field (rock club) =

- Address: Brooks Tower building
- Location: 1020 15th Street; Denver, Colorado, U.S.
- Owner: Chuck Morris, Cindy Fey (in partnership with Barry Fey)
- Capacity: 238–250
- Type: Music club, Concert venue

Construction
- Opened: February 13, 1973
- Closed: 1977

Ebbets Field was an influential music club located in Denver, Colorado, operating from February 1973 to 1977. Founded by Chuck Morris, Barry Fey, and Cindy Fey, it was situated in the Brooks Tower building at 1020 15th Street. Despite its small capacity of only 238 to 250 patrons, the venue played a significant role in Denver's music scene by hosting a diverse array of notable emerging and established artists across rock, blues, folk, jazz, and comedy. Recognized for its quality and impact, Ebbets Field was named "Club of the Year" by Billboard magazine in 1975 and 1976. Many performances were professionally recorded by the local audio company ListenUp and broadcast on Denver radio stations, creating a substantial archive that contributes to the club's lasting legacy.

== History ==
=== Predecessor venues and founding ===
Ebbets Field occupied a space on the street level, potentially sunken below street grade, within the Brooks Tower condominium building near the intersection of 15th and Curtis streets in downtown Denver. The address was listed on tickets and promotional materials as 1020 15th Street. Before becoming Ebbets Field, the venue operated as a club called "Marvelous Marv's". Phone records from the era also associate a "Mercy Farm Pie Shop" with the Brooks Tower building, suggesting an even earlier identity for the location, though its direct succession to Marvelous Marv's is not definitively established by available sources.

In 1973, Chuck Morris, who had been managing the Tulagi nightclub in Boulder and sought to enter the Denver market, partnered with established Denver concert promoter Barry Fey and his wife, Cindy Fey, to acquire Marvelous Marv's. Morris had recognized the need to collaborate with Fey, the dominant promoter in Denver, to advance his career. The purchase price for the small club was $110,000.

The ownership arrangement reflected both Morris's ambition and a pragmatic response to Barry Fey's circumstances. Fey had a recent felony conviction related to Richard Nixon, which legally prevented him from holding a liquor license. Consequently, the club's license, retained from Marvelous Marv's, was put in Cindy Fey's name, making Cindy Fey and Chuck Morris the official owners on paper. This structure allowed the partnership to proceed despite the legal constraints.

Chuck Morris, originally from Brooklyn, New York, chose the name "Ebbets Field" in homage to the historic ballpark of the Brooklyn Dodgers, located near his childhood home. The club officially opened its doors on February 13, 1973, featuring a performance by the Mark-Almond Band.

=== Operations (1973–1977) ===
During its four-year run, Ebbets Field significantly contributed to elevating Denver's status within the national music landscape, which had previously been considered secondary to major coastal markets. The club quickly established a reputation for its astute booking strategy, which focused on presenting a wide variety of artists, often just as they were gaining national prominence. This approach brought early tours of future stars like Lynyrd Skynyrd, Tom Waits, Billy Joel, Steve Martin, The Ramones, Dolly Parton, and many others to Denver, performing in an unusually intimate setting.

The venue maintained a busy schedule, with shows occurring almost nightly. It was common for artists to perform two sets per evening and engage in multi-night residencies. This frequency provided ample opportunities for Denver's music fans, particularly college-aged audiences, to experience live music. The typical cover charge was modest, reported as $2.50–$3.00 or sometimes $4 with no drink minimum required. While operating under a liquor license that made it a 21-and-over establishment, at least one account suggests underage patrons might have been admitted with hand stamps, though policies may have varied. The club's success in attracting significant talent to a small room played a crucial role in developing Denver into a "must-play" city for touring musicians.

=== Closure ===
Ebbets Field ceased operations in 1977. While some sources mention a 1976 closing date, particularly in relation to ListenUp's involvement or Billboard award dates, the consensus from historical accounts and performance listings points to 1977 as the final year. Barry Fey's recollection of the club lasting only "two years" likely refers to a specific period of his active involvement or is a simplification.

The closure was not a result of failure but rather a consequence of its success. Chuck Morris sold his stake in the club in 1977, capitalizing on the reputation and experience gained to pursue opportunities in larger-scale concert promotion. He subsequently joined Barry Fey's company, Feyline Presents, as Senior Vice President, helping to promote major concerts at venues like Red Rocks Amphitheatre. The groundwork laid by Ebbets Field helped pave the way for subsequent larger Denver venues with which Morris and Fey were involved, including the Rainbow Music Hall, which opened in 1979.

== Venue characteristics ==
=== Location and layout ===
Ebbets Field was located at 1020 15th Street in downtown Denver, occupying commercial space within the Brooks Tower residential building. Positioned near the corner of 15th and Curtis streets, the venue was known for its extremely limited capacity, officially seating 238 patrons, though figures up to 250 are sometimes cited. This small size was a defining characteristic, fostering an exceptionally intimate connection between performers and the audience.

A notable feature of the layout was the absence of a lobby. Patrons entered directly into the main performance space, creating a contained environment during shows. As Jello Biafra recalled,

you couldn't go hang out in the lobby because there wasn't one.

— Jello Biafra

This lack of ancillary space meant audience members were fully immersed in the performance area once admitted.

=== Interior and atmosphere ===
The interior of Ebbets Field was distinct and highly characteristic of 1970s design. Its most memorable feature was the extensive use of shag carpeting, described as "ick-orange and brown," which covered not only the floors but also the walls, the ceiling, and the tiered, bleacher-style seating. This pervasive carpeting defined the visual and tactile environment of the club, contributing to its unique identity and period feel.

The seating arrangement consisted of stadium-style bleachers, which rose away from the stage. The stage itself was situated at the lowest point in the room, creating an unusual perspective for the performers, who reportedly saw mainly the heads of the audience members looking down at them. The ceiling was noted as being rather low.

The artists' dressing room was described evocatively as "lushly decrepit," and performers sometimes gave interviews from this space between sets. Despite, or perhaps because of, its physical quirks and small scale, the club was remembered fondly by patrons and artists as a "fun place" with a unique vibe. The intimacy allowed audiences to feel exceptionally close to the performers, almost "on top of" them, sensing the energy of the performance directly. The expectation, at least during some periods or for certain types of shows, was for the audience to remain seated during concerts.

Adjacent to the club was a coffee shop. Anecdotes suggest artists and patrons congregated there, such as Tom Waits reportedly meeting Chuck E. Weiss there.

== Notable performers and events ==
=== Scope of artists ===
Ebbets Field was renowned for the breadth and quality of talent it presented, spanning genres from rock, blues, country, and folk to jazz and comedy. Its booking strategy focused on catching artists on their way up, resulting in performances by numerous musicians and comedians who would achieve major stardom. The club served as a key early venue for acts making their first tours or introducing significant new work.

The following table lists a selection of the diverse and notable artists who performed at Ebbets Field during its operation:

Notable Performers at Ebbets Field
Artist	Genre(s)	Year(s) Performed	Ref(s)							
Lynyrd Skynyrd	Southern Rock	1973+								
Tom Waits	Singer-songwriter, folk	1974+	(Photo dated 2/18/75)							
Billy Joel	Pop, rock	1973+								
Steve Martin	Comedy	1974, 1976								
The Ramones	Punk rock	1977	(Photo dated 3/15/77)							
Muddy Waters	Blues	1973, 1977	-	Willie Nelson	Country	1970s				
Dolly Parton	Country	1974	(Photo dated 4/25/74; original text stated 1977)							
Little Feat	Rock, Southern rock	1973+	(Photo dated 7/19/73)							
Herbie Hancock	Jazz fusion	1970s								
Chick Corea	Jazz fusion	1976	-	Freddie Hubbard	Jazz	1973, 1976, 1977	-	Richard Pryor	Comedy	1970s
Cheech and Chong	Comedy	1975	(Photo dated 6/12/75; original text stated 1976)							
Kraftwerk	Electronic	1975								
Joan Armatrading	Singer-songwriter, folk	1973								
Dan Fogelberg	Singer-songwriter, rock	1974								
Taj Mahal	Blues, World	1973, 1976								
Gene Clark	Folk rock, Country rock	1975, 1977								
Commander Cody	Country Rock, swing	1973								
J. J. Cale	Blues rock, Roots rock	1975								
Emmylou Harris	Country, Folk	1975								

=== Notable events ===
Beyond the routine schedule of performances, several specific events became part of the Ebbets Field legend.

One frequently recounted story involves comedian Steve Martin. Following his performance on New Year's Eve 1974, during a blizzard, Martin spontaneously led the entire audience out of the club and across the street for coffee. One source adds a detail that Martin initially ordered 300 doughnuts before changing the order to a single cup of coffee, amplifying the absurdity. This impromptu excursion became a signature Ebbets Field anecdote.

Other notable moments include Billy Joel reportedly introducing his new song "Piano Man" to audiences at the club. The Denver debut of The Ramones in March 1977 also left a strong impression. Booked as openers for the band Nite City, their loud, fast, minimalist punk rock starkly contrasted with the prevailing musical tastes of the regular Ebbets Field clientele (described by Jello Biafra as "country-rock glitterati" and "cocaine cowboys"). The performance created a memorable culture clash within the small room. The Ramones were invited back to headline the following night.

The club's orbit also touched music history in other ways. Tom Waits is said to have met fellow musician Chuck E. Weiss at the coffee shop adjacent to Ebbets Field, an encounter that later inspired Waits's song "Chuck E.'s in Love". Weiss reportedly served as a drummer in the Ebbets Field house band at one point. These incidents contributed to Ebbets Field's reputation as a place where unique cultural moments occurred.

== Recordings and broadcasts ==
A crucial aspect of Ebbets Field's legacy is the extensive archive of live recordings made at the venue. Many performances were professionally recorded, primarily by the local audio company ListenUp. Founded by Walton Stinson and Steve Weiner, ListenUp provided the sound system and recorded shows. The phrase "Sound by ListenUp" became associated with the venue. ListenUp recorded over 300 shows, amassing thousands of hours of tape, initially using the recordings to demonstrate their audio equipment.

This recording activity was linked to local radio. ListenUp arranged for many shows to be broadcast live (simulcast) or taped for later airing on Denver radio stations like KFML-FM, KBPI, and later KCUV, receiving on-air promotion in return. This provided exposure for the artists and club, promotion for ListenUp, and unique content for the stations.

The ListenUp tapes became a significant historical archive. Years later, ListenUp's Phil Murray collaborated with G. Brown of KCUV to curate selections. This resulted in a four-volume CD collection titled Live From Ebbets Field, released as a fundraiser for the Morgan Adams Foundation. These official releases are now collector's items.

In addition to official releases, widespread broadcasting led to numerous unofficial or bootleg recordings circulating among collectors, sourced from radio broadcasts or the ListenUp tapes. Audience members also reportedly recorded the radio broadcasts. Many recordings can be found on platforms like YouTube. The extensive recording effort forms an enduring part of the club's legacy.

== Recognition ==
Ebbets Field achieved significant national recognition, being awarded "Club of the Year" by Billboard magazine for two consecutive years: 1975 and 1976. This acknowledged the club's quality, booking strategy, and impact despite its small size and location outside traditional music centers.

== Legacy ==
Ebbets Field left a lasting mark on the Denver music scene, remembered as the city's premier concert venue of the mid-1970s. It played a pivotal role in establishing Denver as an important stop for national touring artists, celebrated for its intimate atmosphere and the chance to see major talents early in their careers. Attendees often refer to it as the "glory days" of live music.

The club's influence extended beyond its operation. Experience gained there helped launch Chuck Morris's highly successful career in large-scale concert promotion. Its success influenced later Denver venues like the Rainbow Music Hall.

An extensive archive of live recordings was captured by ListenUp, preserving the venue's sounds. Through official releases, bootlegs, and online sharing, these recordings provide audible evidence of Ebbets Field's place in music history.
