= First Interstate Tower =

First Interstate Tower is a name that was carried by several bank buildings of the former First Interstate Bancorp, in the United States, and may refer to:

- Aon Center (Los Angeles), California, formerly named First Interstate Tower
- Wells Fargo Center (Portland, Oregon), formerly named First Interstate Tower
- Fountain Place, in Dallas, Texas, formerly named First Interstate Tower
- 621 17th Street, in Denver, Colorado, formerly named First Interstate Tower South
- 633 17th Street, in Denver, Colorado, formerly named First Interstate Tower North

== See also ==
- First Interstate Tower fire
- First Interstate Center (disambiguation)
