= The Old Prospector =

Statue in Denver, Colorado

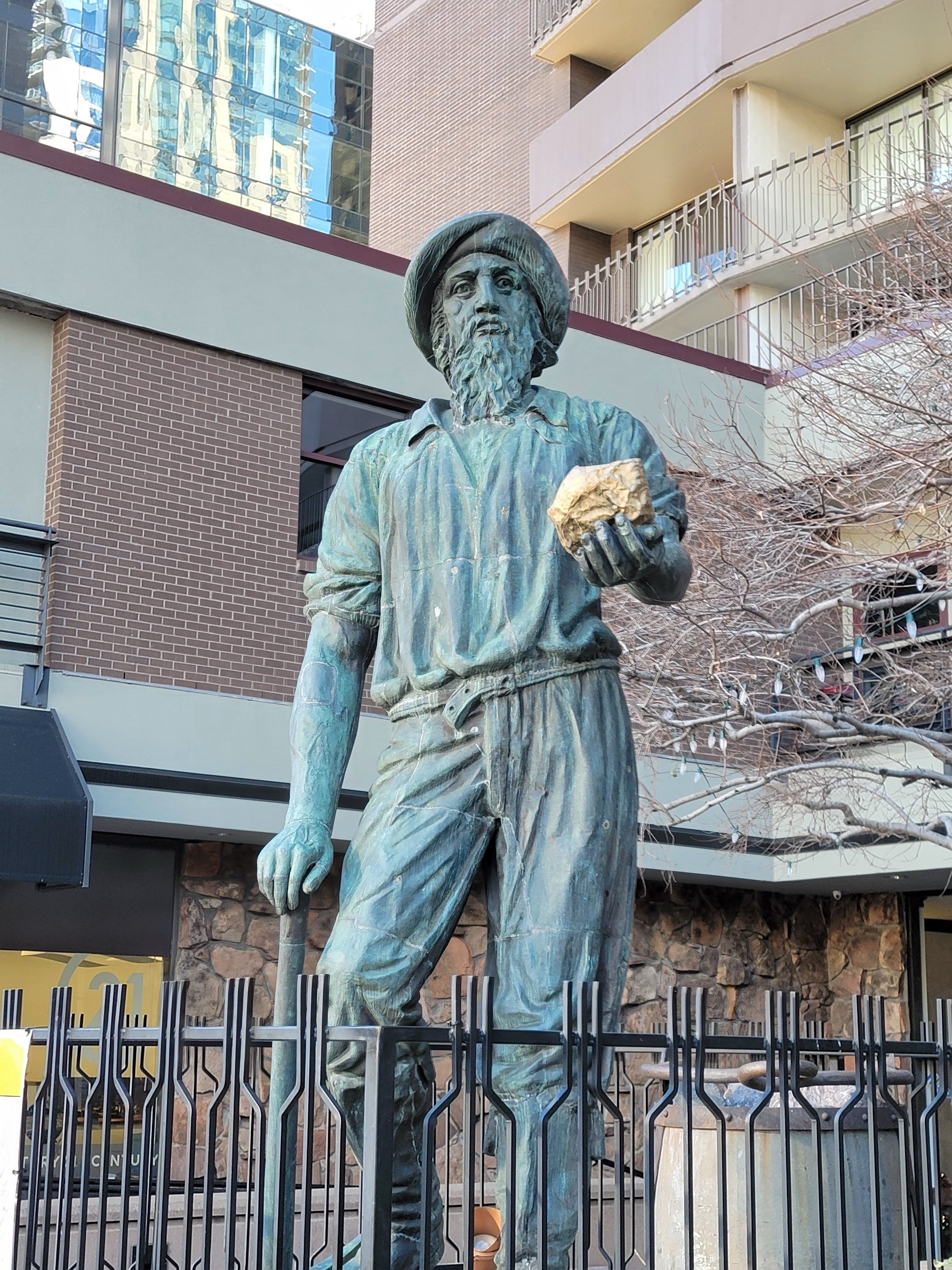
- Location: Denver, Colorado, U.S.
- Coordinates: 39°44′47.3″N 104°59′47.6″W

The Prospector, also known as The Old Prospector, is a historic statue located in Denver, Colorado, currently situated in the plaza outside Brooks Tower. Originally installed atop the Mining Exchange Building in 1891, it was preserved when the building was demolished and later moved to its current location.

== History ==
In 1890 and 1891, the seven-story Mining Exchange Building was constructed at the corner of 15th and Arapahoe Streets in Denver, serving as a major financial center for the region's mining industry. To crown the building, sculptor Alphonse Pelzer was commissioned to create a statue representing a prospector. The resulting work, titled The Old Prospector, was a 12-foot (3.7 m) high, 490-pound (220 kg) statue crafted from hand-made copper. The model for the statue was reportedly Colonel John William Straughn (1842–1902), described as a flamboyant Civil War veteran, prospector, and wheelwright. The statue depicted a miner holding a mining pick in his right hand and a piece of gold ore in his left.

The Old Prospector stood atop the Mining Exchange Building from its installation in 1891 until the building was demolished around 1963. Unlike the building, the statue was preserved.

== Relocation and Current Status ==
Brooks Tower, a 42-story residential high-rise, was constructed on the former site of the Mining Exchange Building and completed in 1968. Following the tower's construction, The Old Prospector statue was installed in the plaza or garden area at the entrance to Brooks Tower, located on the south side of 15th Street between Arapahoe and Curtis Streets.

As of April 2025, the statue remains in this location. It serves as a reminder of the site's history and Denver's mining heritage, and is noted as a tourist attraction. A Brooks Tower newsletter from February 2021 also confirmed the statue's continued presence, noting it would celebrate its 130th anniversary that year.

This statue is distinct from the "Prospector" figure that was part of Denver's Pioneer Monument, which depicted Kit Carson atop the fountain until its removal in 2020.
