= 555 17th Street =

Skyscraper in Denver, Colorado

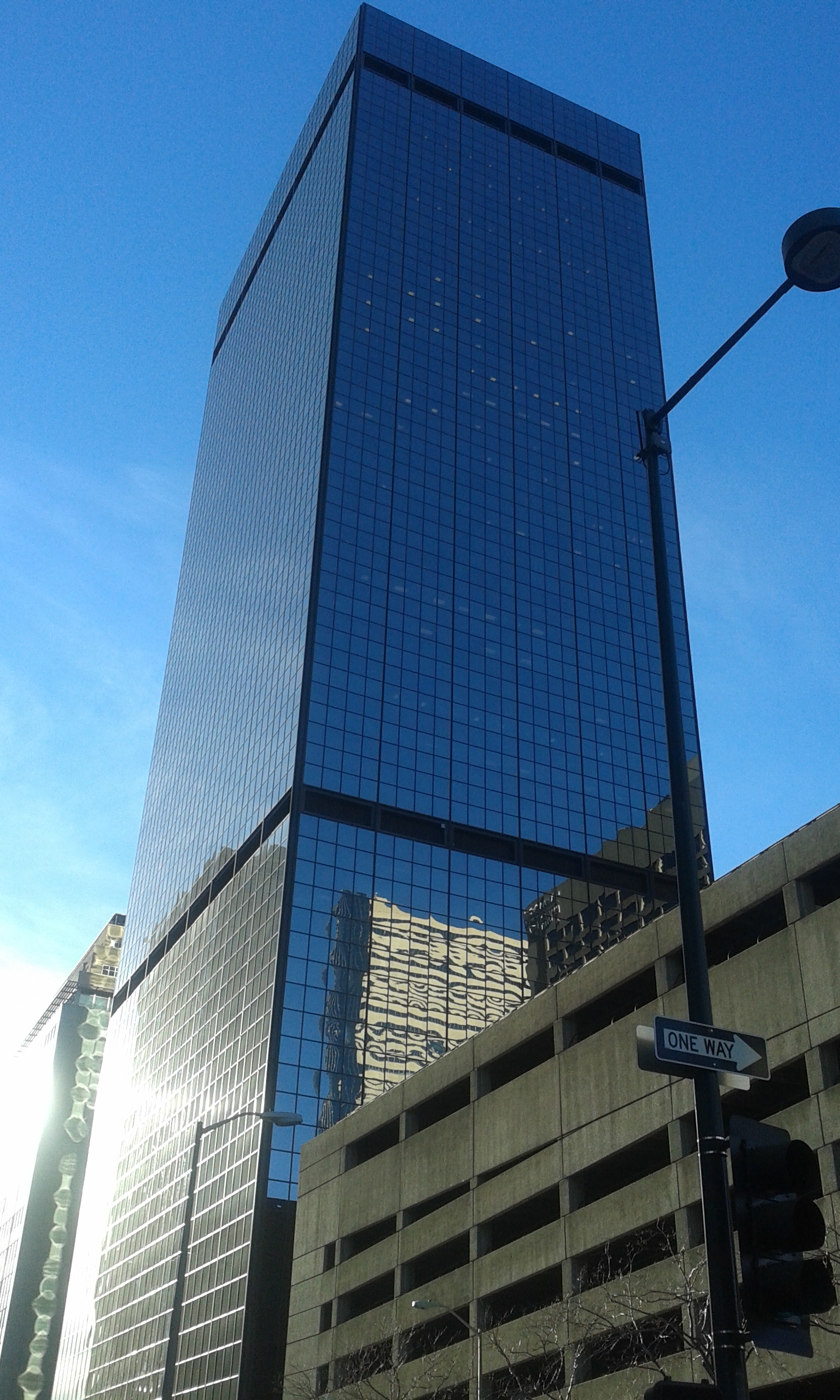
- Interactive map of the 555 17th Street area

General information
- Status: Completed
- Type: Office
- Location: 555 17th Street, Denver, Colorado, United States
- Coordinates: 39.745185°N 104.989549°W
- Opening: 1978
- Owner: Antelope Properties, Qwest Communications International, Inc.

Height
- Roof: 507 ft (155 m)

Technical details
- Floor count: 38
- Floor area: 683,207 sq ft (63,472.0 m^{2})

Design and construction
- Architect: Skidmore, Owings & Merrill
- Developer: Mile High Properties

555 17th Street, formerly known as the Anaconda Tower and the Qwest Tower, is a skyscraper in Denver, Colorado. The building was completed in 1978, and rises 40 floors and 507 feet (155 m) in height. The building stands as the seventh-tallest building in Denver and Colorado. It also stood as the tallest building in the city at the time of its 1978 completion, and held that distinction for three years until it was surpassed by the 522-foot (159 m) 707 17th Street in 1981.

555 17th Street was originally known as the Anaconda Tower, after the Anaconda Company who relocated their headquarters from New York City to Denver in 1978. The building became the world headquarters of Qwest in 1997, at which point it was adorned with two large Qwest signs. The building served as Qwest's headquarters until 2000, when the corporation moved to 1801 California Street, the second-tallest building in Denver situated two blocks away. Although Qwest moved its headquarters in 2000, the two brightly lit blue signs on 555 17th Street remained in place for four more years. Qwest finally removed the logos in 2004, but prior to that the signs were left dark for several months.

555 17th Street is composed entirely of Class A office space, containing features such as a tenants' restaurant, private club, and conference center. The building is home to the offices of accounting firm RSM US LLP. Holland & Hart LLP, a major law firm, has its headquarters in 555 17th Street. Holland & Hart's firm name now adorns the east-side of the building.

555 17th Street has been installed with several environmentally "green" features, including a 600-ton flat plate heat exchanger and electronic ballast lighting technology. The building's management company, Mile High Properties, estimates that the upgraded features have generated savings of US$$1,835,000 in five years. Due to its green features, 555 17th Street has been designated a "Labeled Building" by Energy Star and the United States Environmental Protection Agency.

Cushman And Wakefield is the current property manager. 555 17th Street has the same owners as the Grand Hyatt.

== Tenants ==
- Huron Consulting Group (16th floor)
- JWT (3rd floor)
- Clarity Media Group (7th floor)
- Examiner.com (4th floor)
- Grand Hyatt Denver (2nd and 38th floors)
- Long View Systems (16th floor)
- RSM US, LLP (11th and 12th floors)
- CDM Smith (10th floor)
- Planisware (17th floor)
- Crescent Point Energy Corp. (18th and 19th floors)
- Willis Towers Watson (20th and 21st floors)
- Gordon and Rees (34th floor)
- Cushman & Wakefield (7th floor)
- Starbucks (lobby)
- FedEx (lobby)
- Snarf's Sandwiches (lobby)

== See also ==
- List of tallest buildings in Denver

Preceded by 633 17th Street	Tallest Building in Denver; 1978—1981; 155m	Succeeded by 707 17th Street
