= Equitable Building (Denver) =

- U.S. National Register of Historic Places
- Colorado State Register of Historic Properties
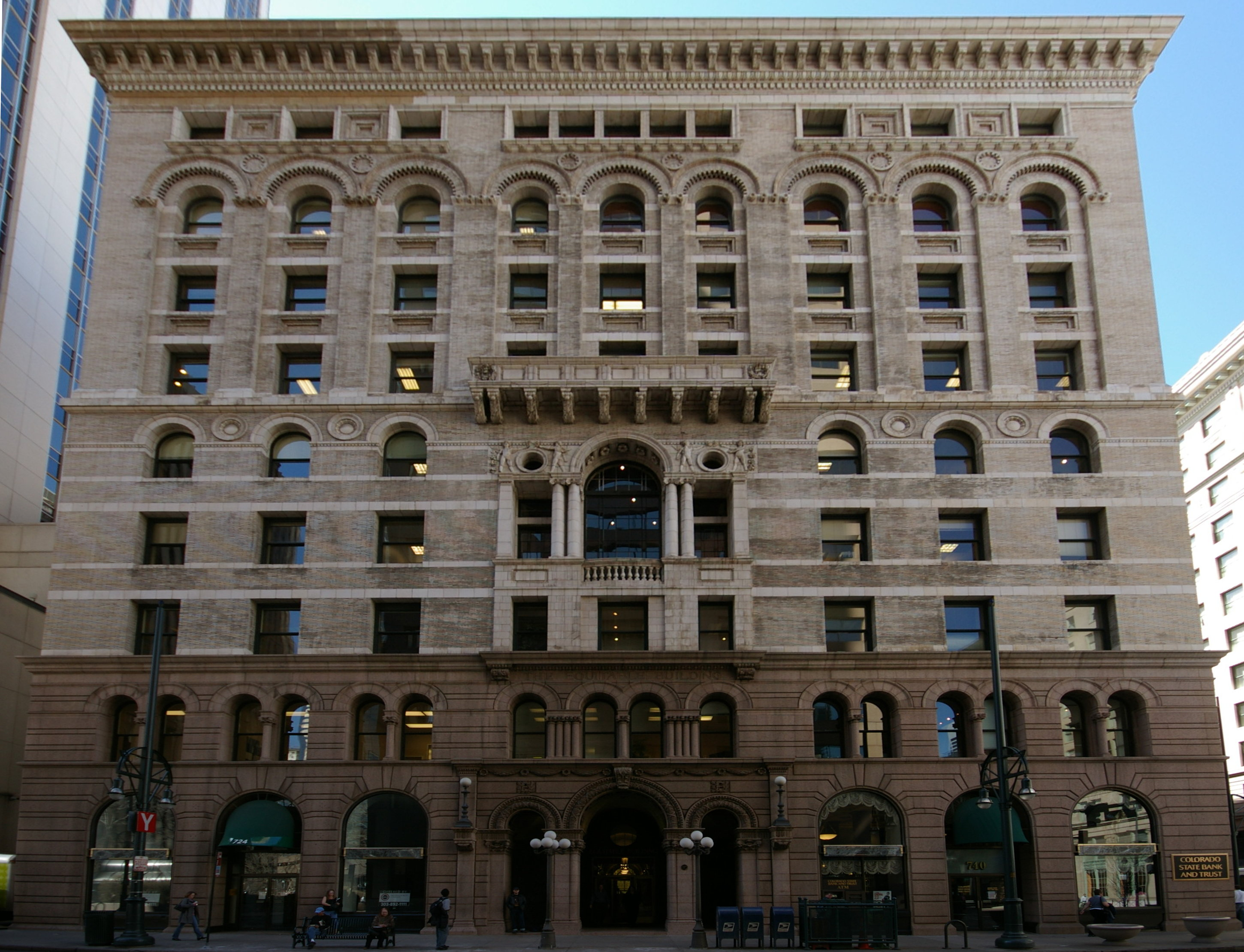

- Location within Colorado Location within the United States
- Location: 730 17th St., Denver, Colorado
- Coordinates: 39°44′47.74″N 104°59′30.12″W
- Area: less than one acre
- Built: 1892
- Architect: Andrews, Jaques & Rantoul
- Architectural style: Renaissance
- NRHP reference No.: 78000845
- CSRHP No.: 5DV.121
- Added to NRHP: January 9, 1978

The Equitable Building is a historic commercial office building located in Denver, Colorado.

== Description and history ==
Standing at a height of 125 feet with 9 stories, the steel-framed office tower became the tallest building in the city upon its completion in 1892, and retained that title until 1911, when it was surpassed by the Daniels & Fisher Tower. It is an excellent example of the Italian Renaissance Revival architecture of its day, with its numerous sets of arched windows and the ornately carved granite that define its appearance.

The building, designed by Andrews, Jaques & Rantoul and built during the Denver building boom of the early 1890s, was highly cutting edge for its time in its utilization of many recent technological advances, and its self-sufficient infrastructure. As is mentioned in its NRHP designation, "To this day, the artesian well in the basement still runs the elevators, of which there are eight. All the rooms had radiators; most had water closets and hot and cold water, and many also had gas fireplaces." The construction costs of the building amounted to $1.5 million.

It was listed on the National Register of Historic Places on January 9, 1978.

Preceded by Unknown	Tallest Building in Denver; 1892—1910; 45m	Succeeded by Daniels & Fisher Tower
