= Daniels & Fisher Tower =

- Daniels and Fisher Tower
- U.S. National Register of Historic Places
- Colorado State Register of Historic Properties
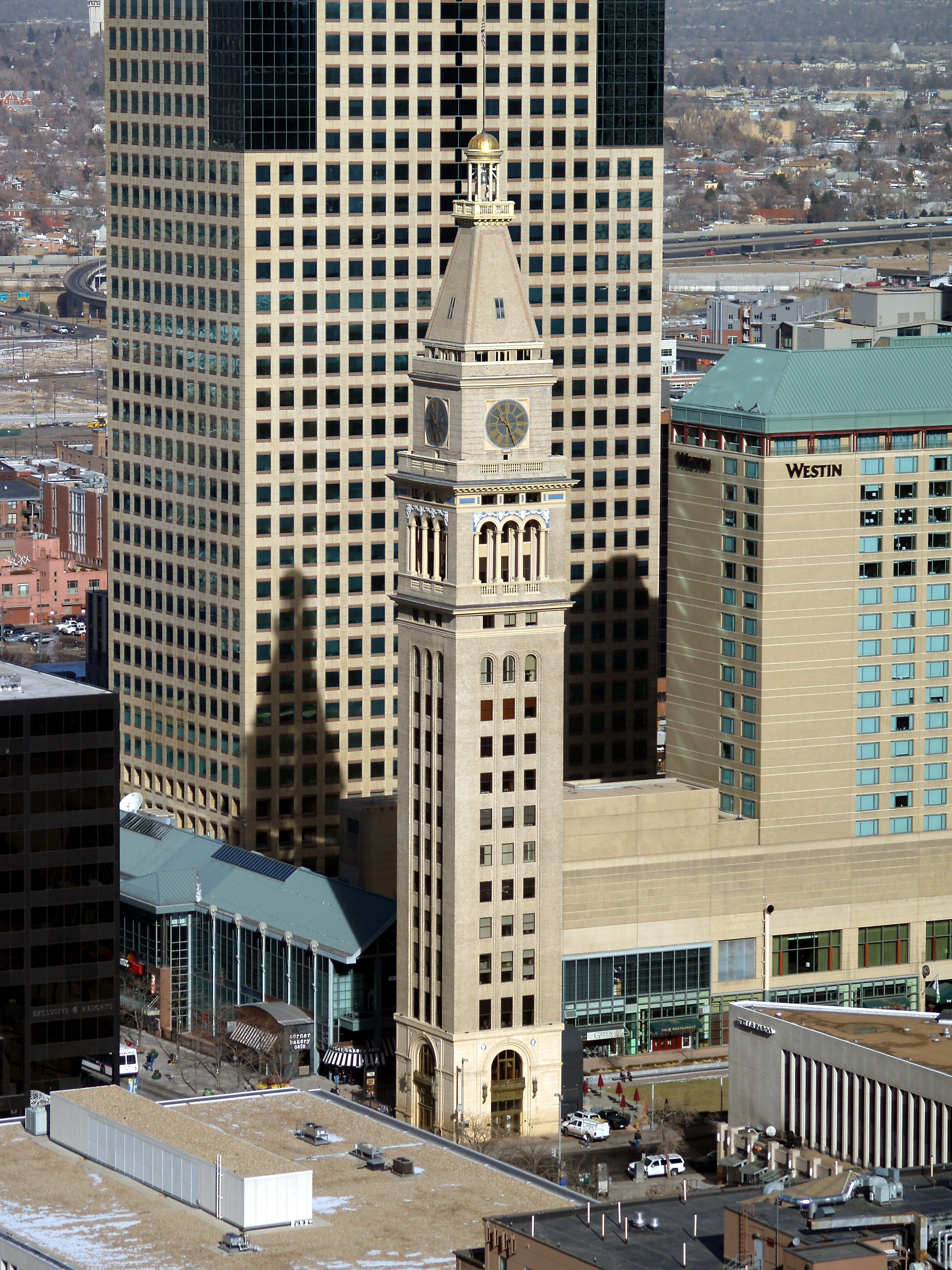
- Daniels and Fisher Tower (foreground) in 2009

- Location within Colorado Location within the United States
- Location: 1101 16th St., Denver, Colorado
- Coordinates: 39°44′54″N 104°59′43″W
- Area: 0.3 acres (0.12 ha)
- Built: 1911
- Architect: F.G. Sterner
- Architectural style: Late 19th and 20th Century Revivals, Italian Renaissance
- NRHP reference No.: 69000040
- CSRHP No.: 5DV.118
- Added to NRHP: December 3, 1969

The Daniels & Fisher Tower is a distinctive historic landmark located in Denver, Colorado.

== Description and history ==
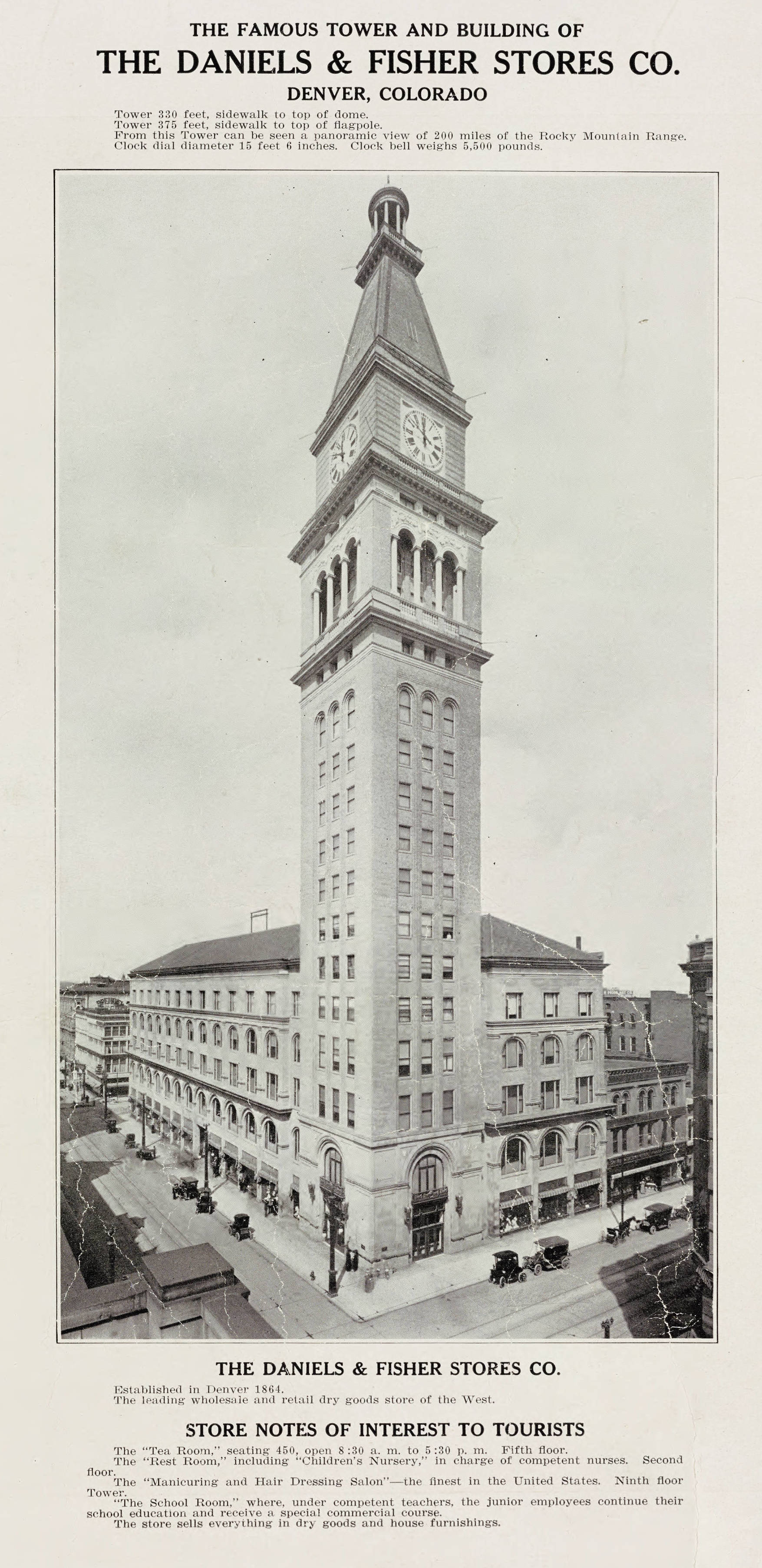
Birds-eye view of Denver and the Rockies as viewed from the tower of the Daniels and Fisher Stores Co., 1913.

Built as part of the Daniels & Fisher department store in 1910, it was the tallest building between the Mississippi River and the state of California at the time of construction, at a height of 325 feet (99 m). The building was designed by the architect Frederick Sterner and modeled after The Campanile (St. Mark's Bell Tower) at the Piazza San Marco in Venice, Italy. The 20-floor clock tower has clock faces on all four sides.

A 5,500 pound bell was installed in the top two floors of the tower on March 30, 1911, with the inscription "Presented to the Daniels & Fisher Realty company by William Cooke Daniels and Cicely Cook Daniels, 1911". The bell was manufactured by the McShane Bell company in Baltimore and was six feet in height and 5.5 feet in width. The clapper for the bell weighed 150 pounds and was connected to an electric motor, which rang the bell each hour.

On June 22, 1918, Jack Williams, known as "the human fly", climbed the tower from the base to the top of the flag pole in 38 minutes.

In 1919, a student nurse named Doris Heller fell from the twentieth story of the tower and landed on the seventeenth floor balcony, suffering a fractured spine and broken feet. After the accident happened, the injured woman was not found until 48 hours after it occurred.

May Company purchased Daniels & Fisher in 1958, and the store vacated the tower. When the store was demolished (ca. 1971), the tower was saved and renovated into residential and office space in 1981.

The tower is located within Denver's Skyline Park and the basement level has been home to the Clocktower Cabaret entertainment venue since 2006.

The tower was listed on the National Register of Historic Places on December 3, 1969.

On August 22, 1983, the tower was climbed by Gary Neptune to raise attention and funds for Mile High United Way's 1983 fund-raising campaign.

== Gallery ==
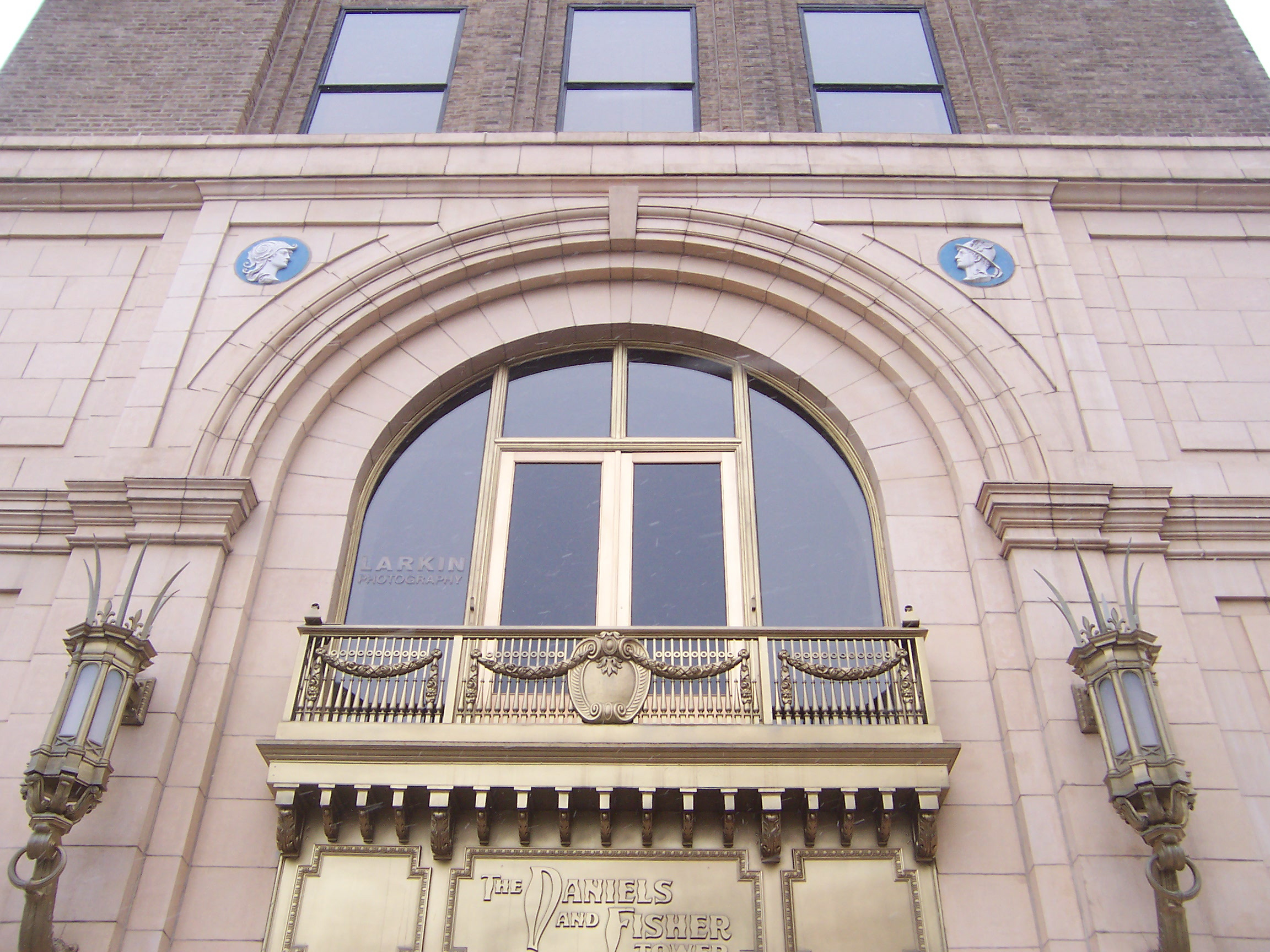
Entrance from 16th street

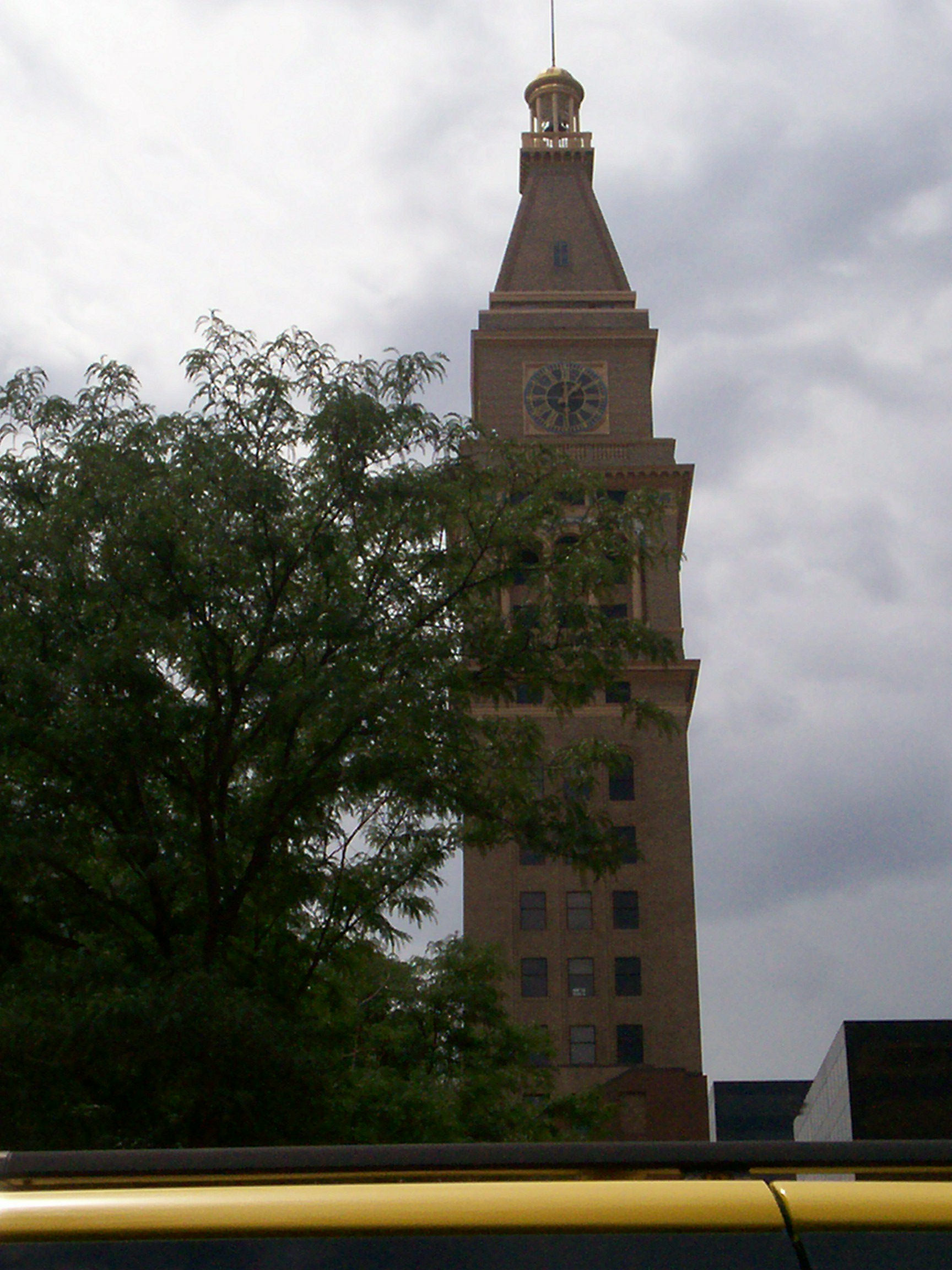
Tower from 17th Street

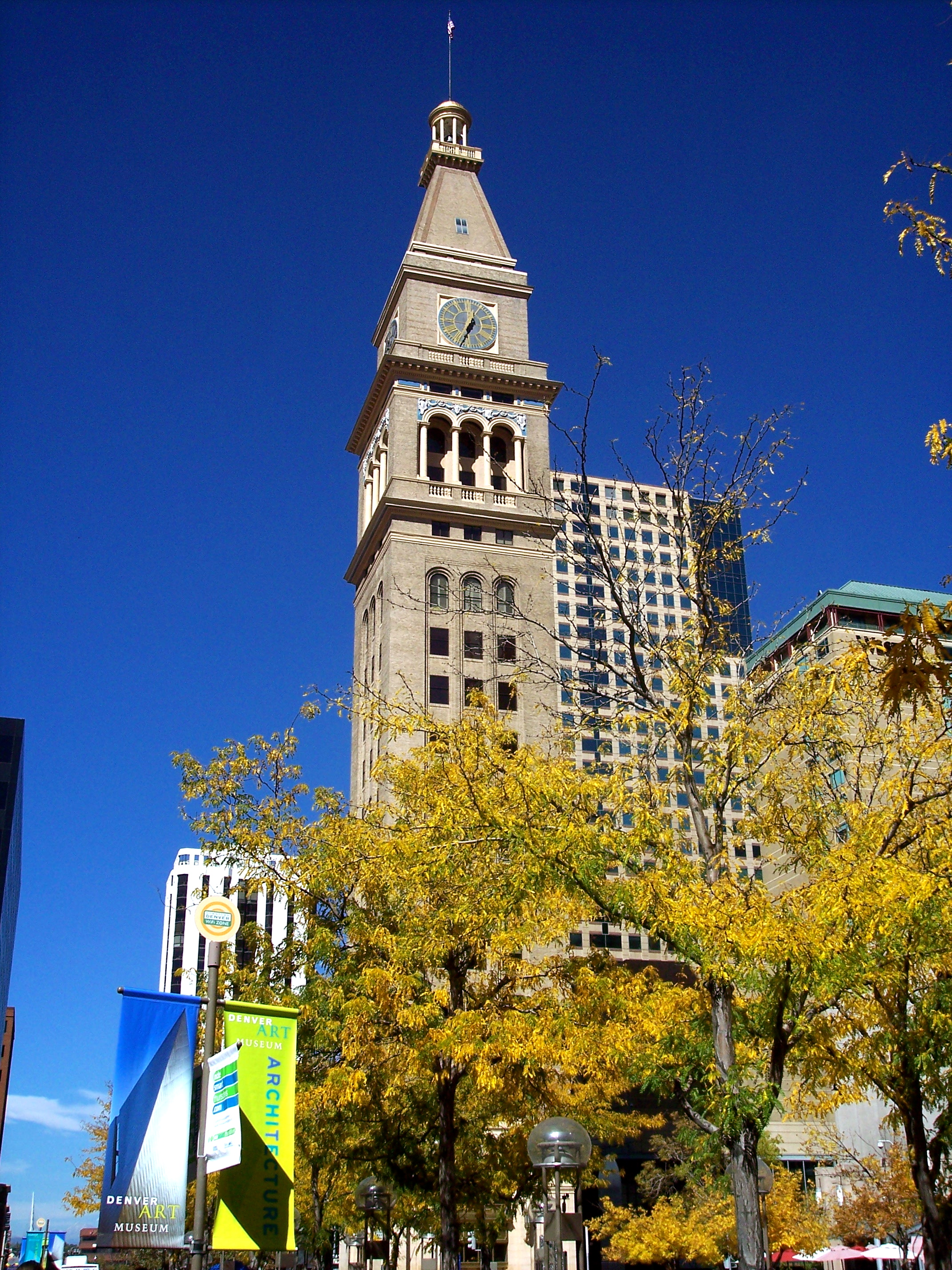
Tower viewed from 16th Street, looking north

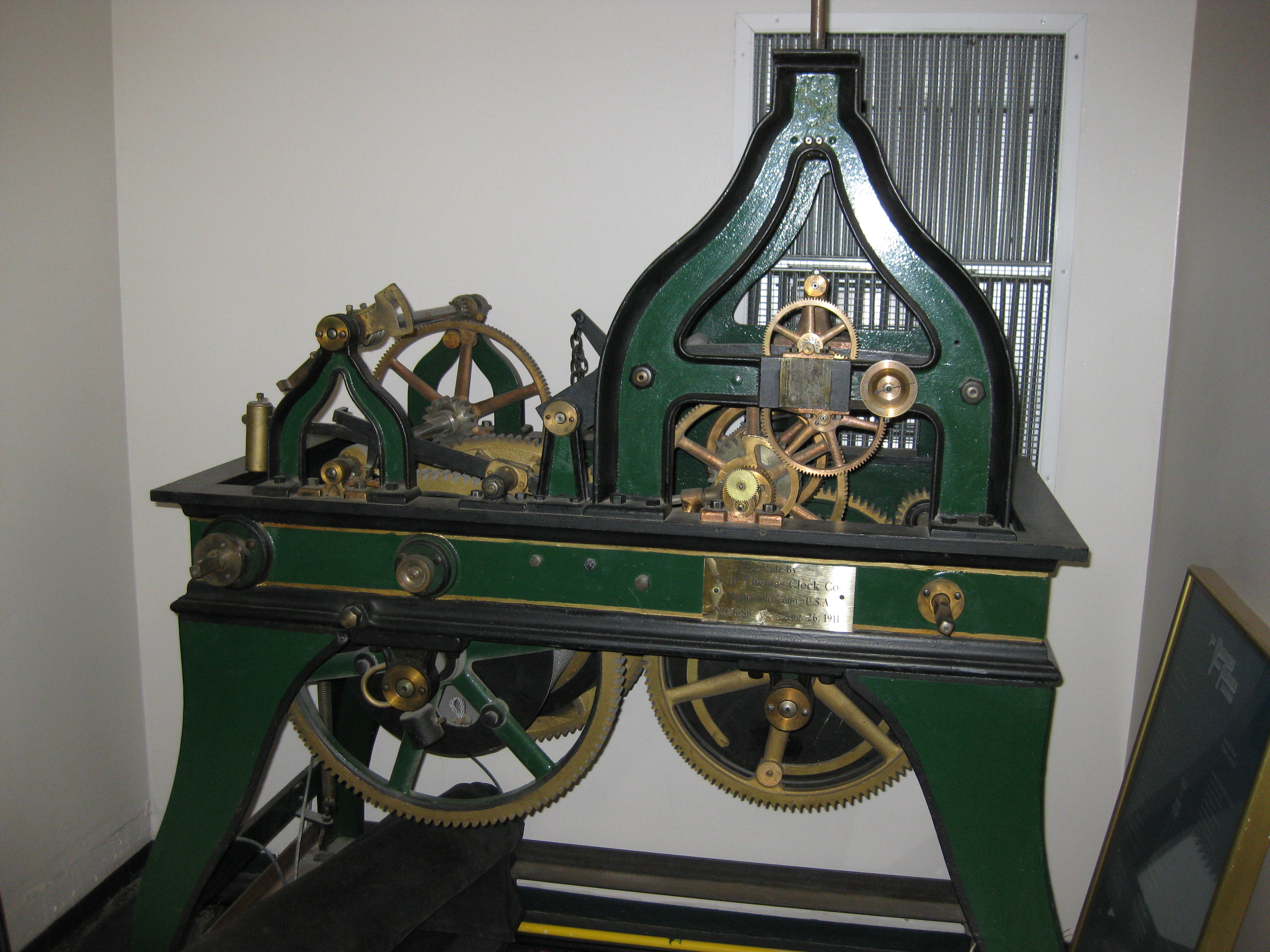
Original clock works

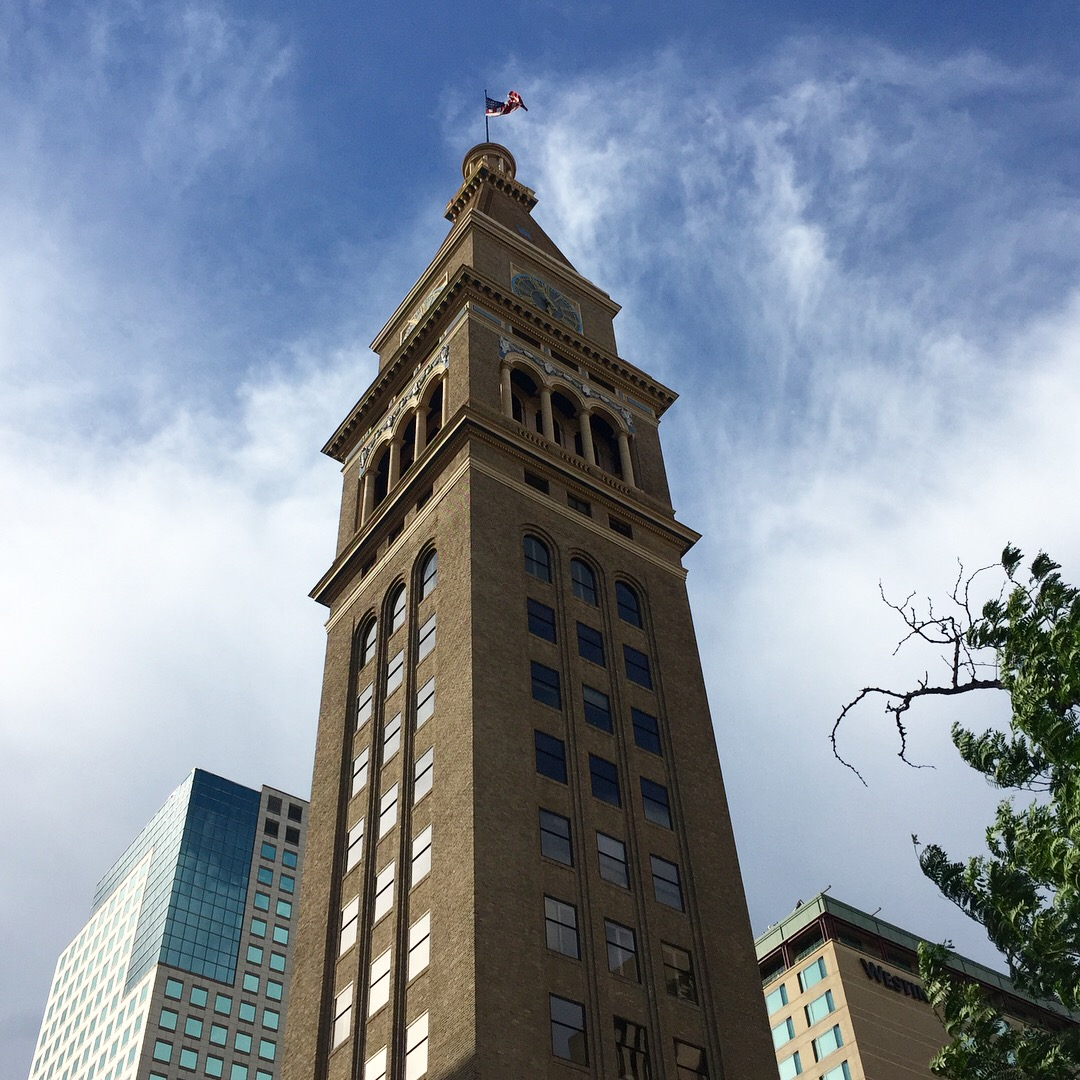
View of Daniels & Fisher Tower from the street

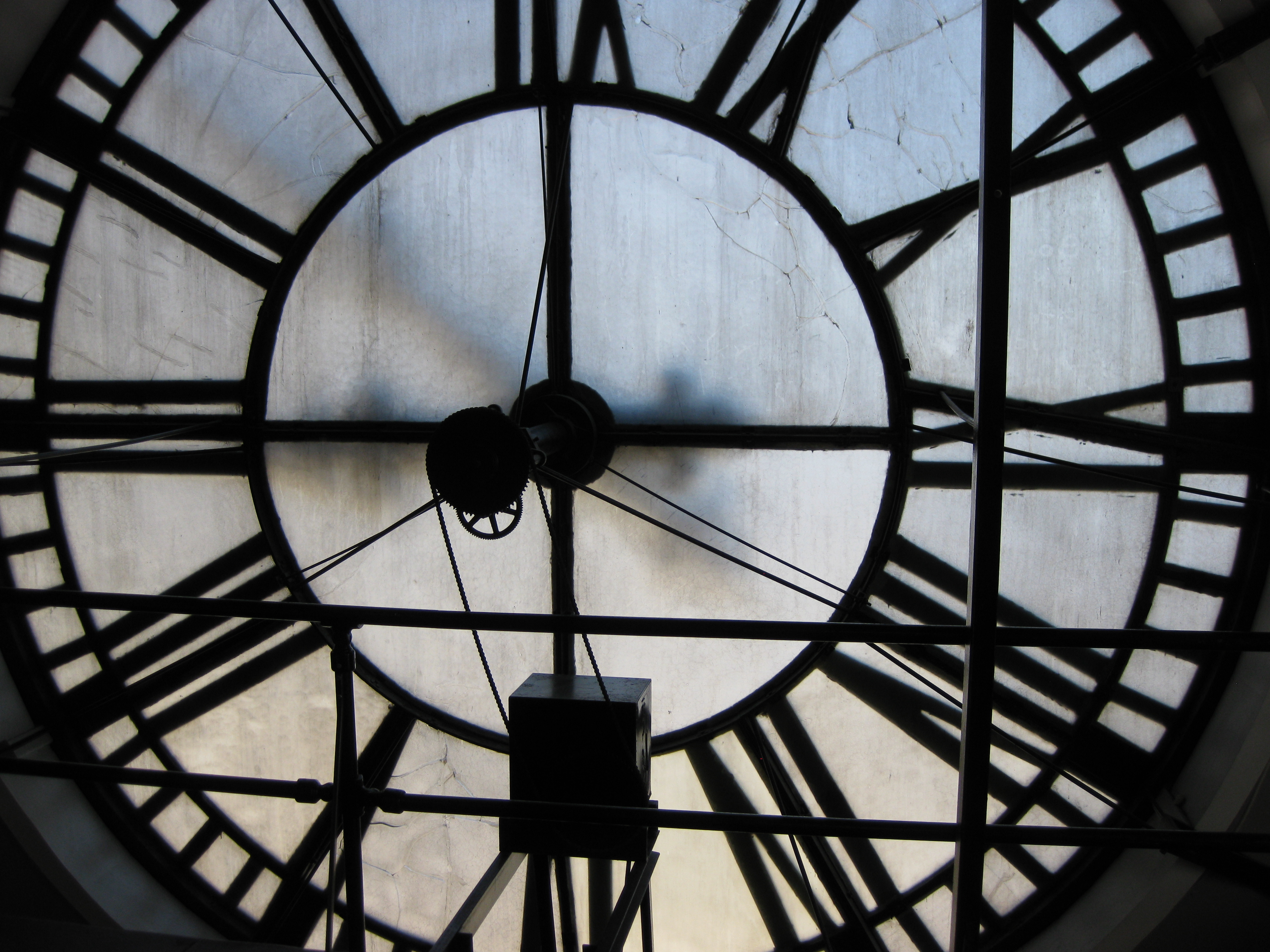
Interior view of southeast clock face

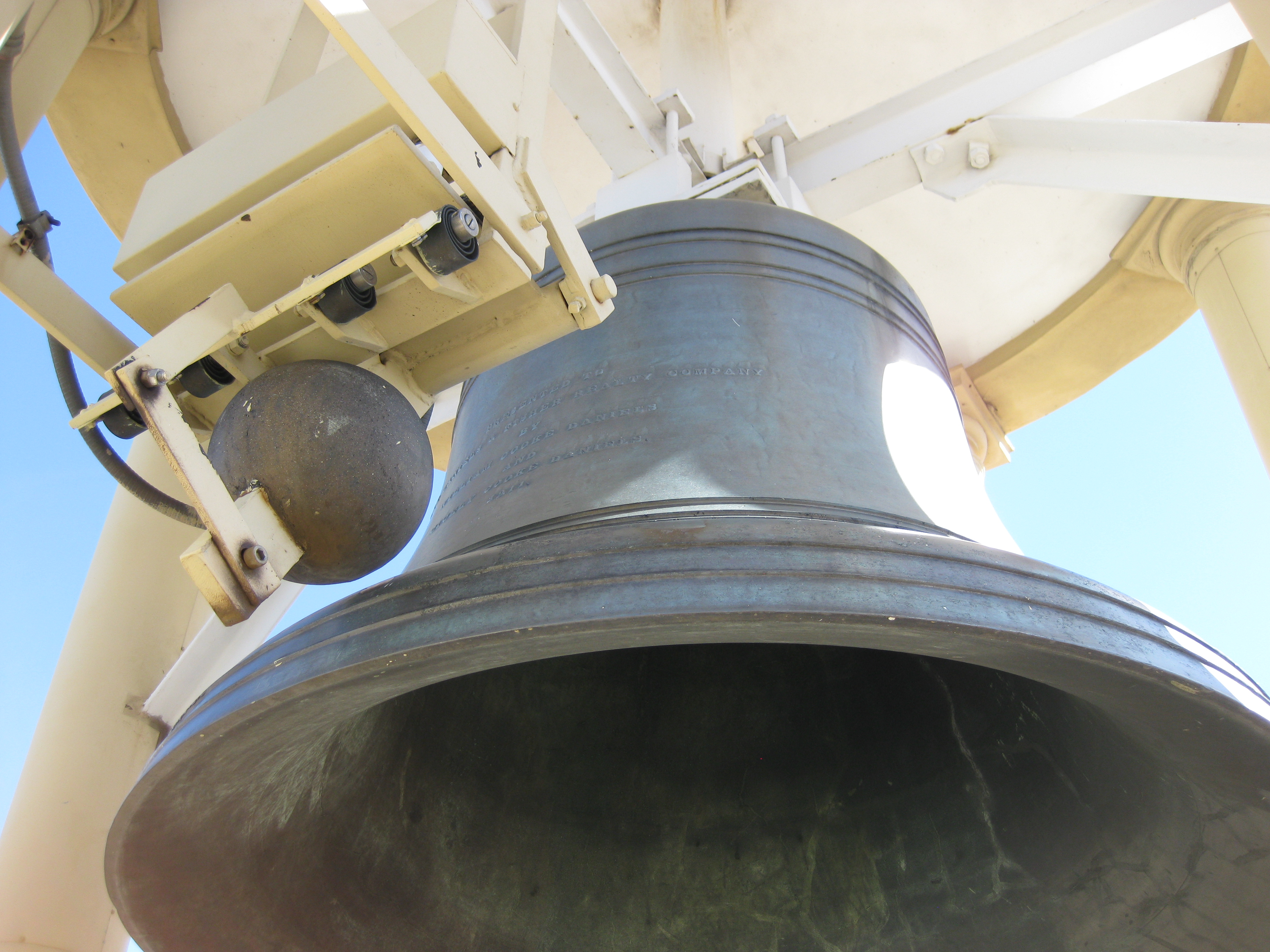
Bell and striker

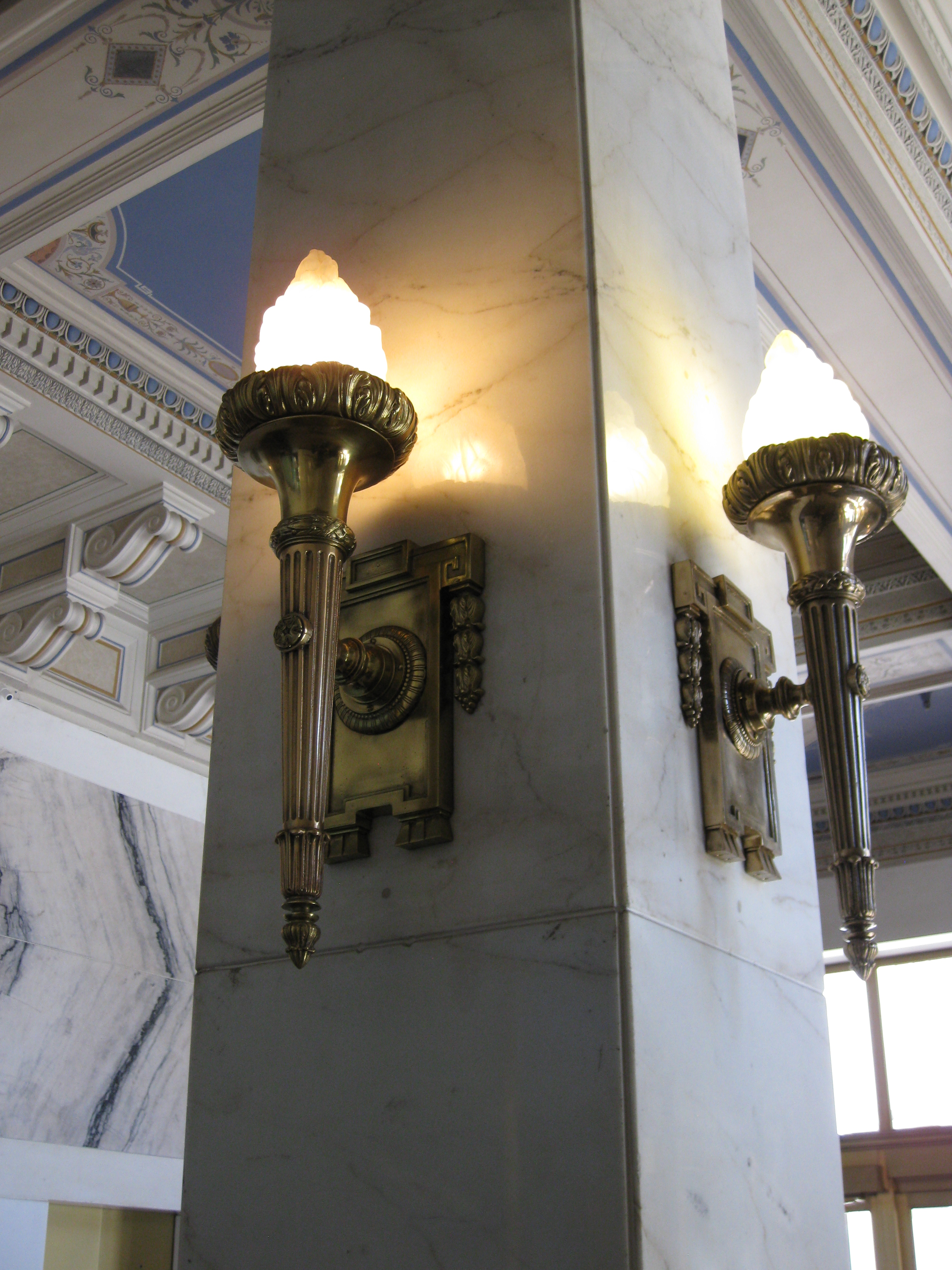
Sconces on first floor

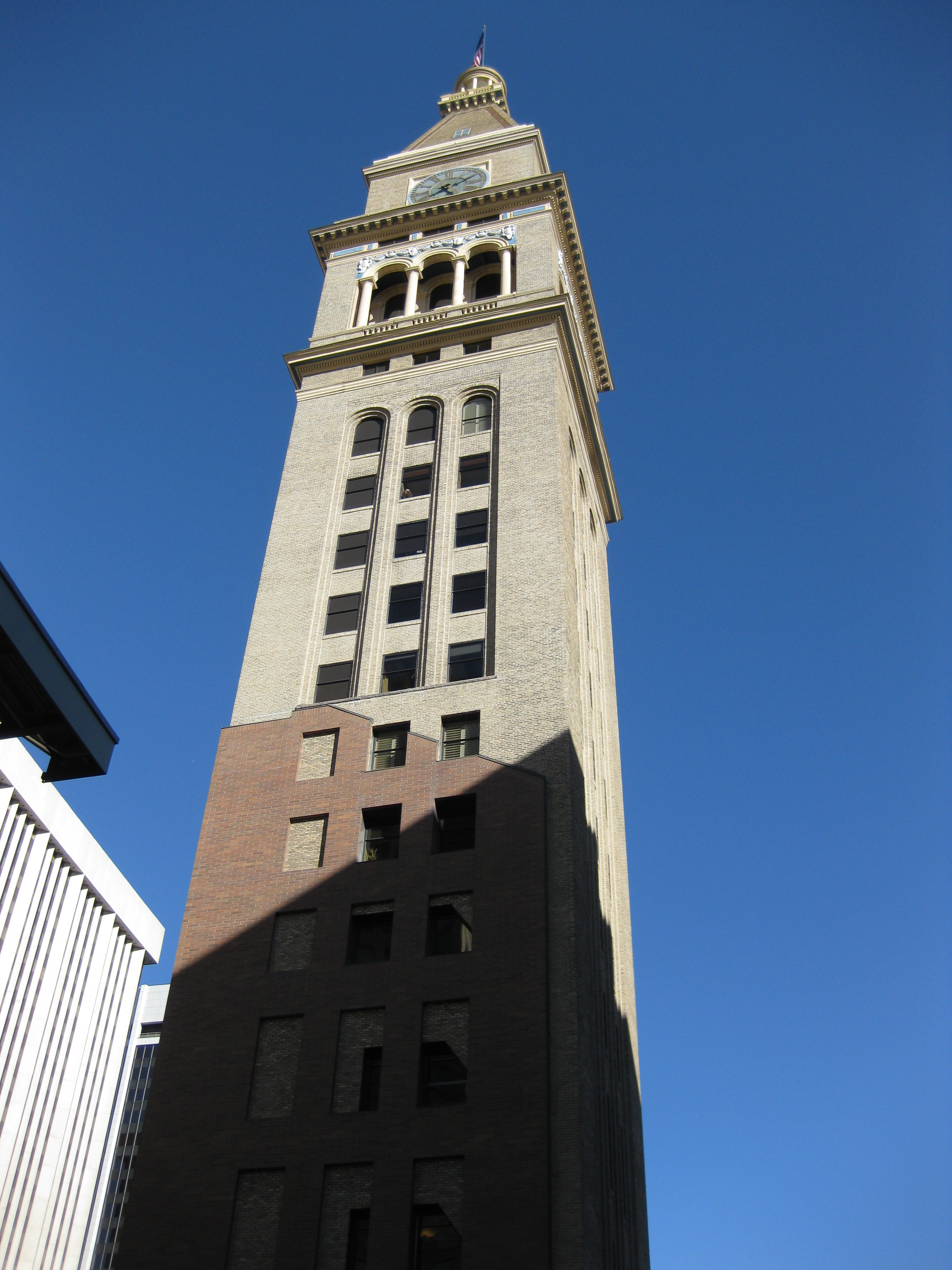
View from north-west (16th Street)

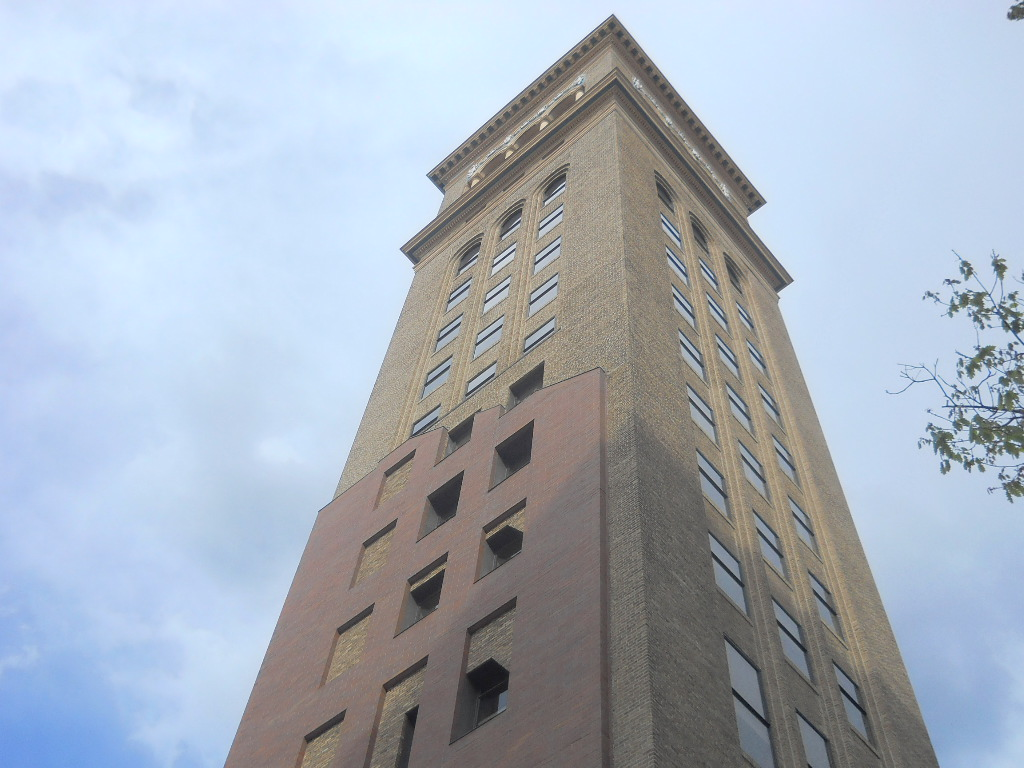
A ground view of the tower

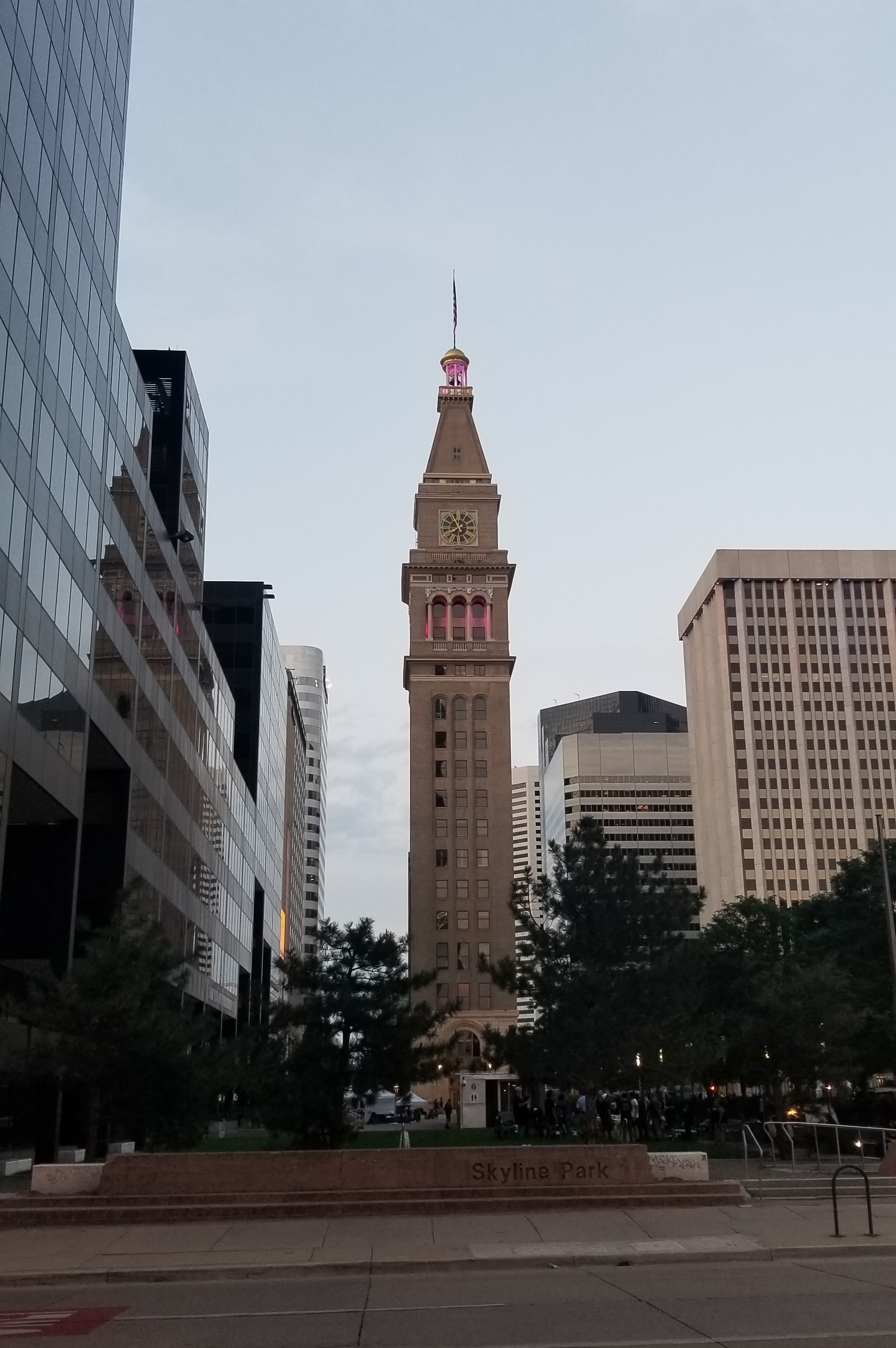
Daniels & Fisher Tower in Denver

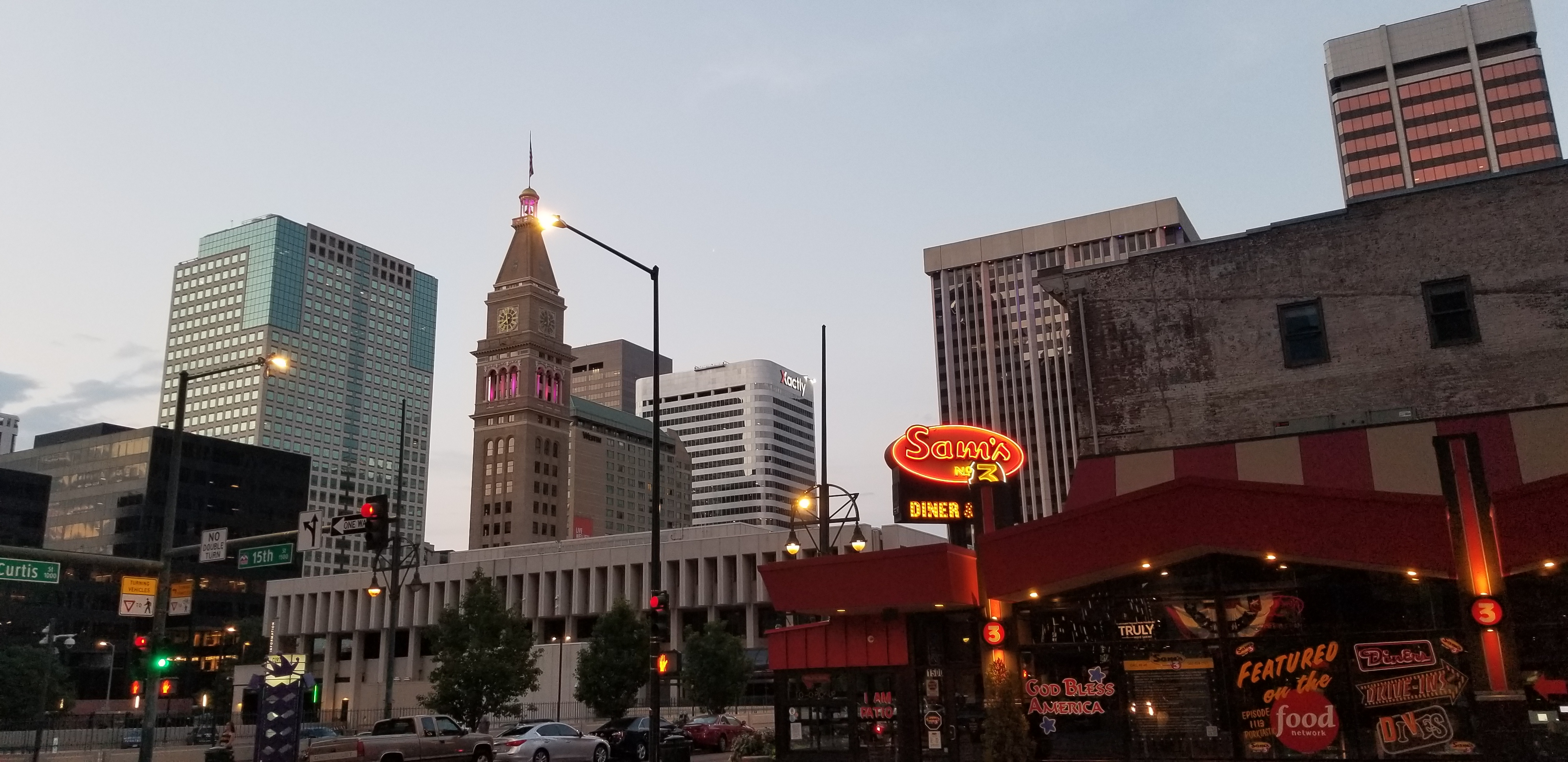
Daniels & Fisher Tower view from Curtis & 15th Street

== See also ==
- May-Daniels & Fisher
- Yule marble

Preceded by Equitable Building	Tallest Building in Denver; 1910—1957; 99m	Succeeded by 621 17th Street
