= 621 17th Street =

High-rise building in Denver, Colorado

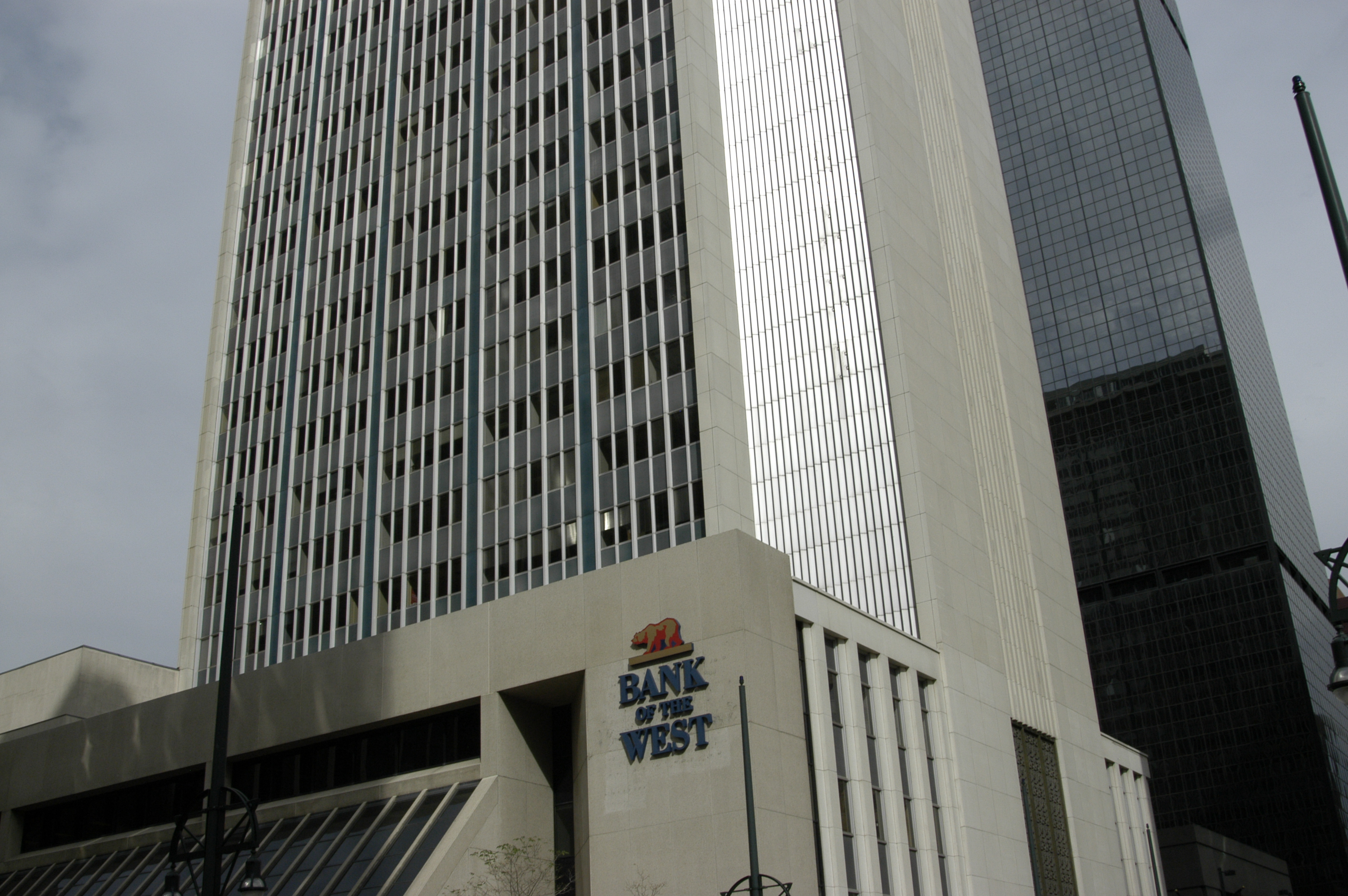
- Interactive map of the 621 17th Street area

General information
- Status: Completed
- Type: Office, Hotel
- Location: 621 17th Street, Denver, Colorado, United States
- Coordinates: 39.745867°N 104.990070°W
- Opening: 1957

Height
- Roof: 385 ft (117 m)

Technical details
- Floor count: 28

Design and construction
- Architects: Raymond Harry Ervin & Associates
- Developer: The Hearn Company, Mead & Mount Construction Company

621 17th Street, formerly known as the First Interstate Tower South, is a high-rise building in Denver, Colorado, United States. The building was completed in 1957, and rises 28 floors and 385 feet (117 m) in height. The building stands as the 20th-tallest building in Denver and Colorado. It also stood as the tallest building in the city at the time of its 1957 completion, and held that distinction for eleven years until it was surpassed by the 420-foot (128 m) Brooks Towers in 1968. 621 17th Street is considered to be one of the earliest modern skyscrapers in Denver.

At the time of its completion, 621 17th Street was known as "First National Bank Building", its primary tenant. After First Interstate merged with Wells Fargo in 1996, the building's official name became its address. The 434-foot (132 m) First Interstate Tower North, now known as 633 17th Street, was built adjacent to First Interstate Tower South in 1974. The two buildings together form the First of Denver Plaza. The building with the First of Denver logo can be seen in the opening credits of the television show Dynasty.

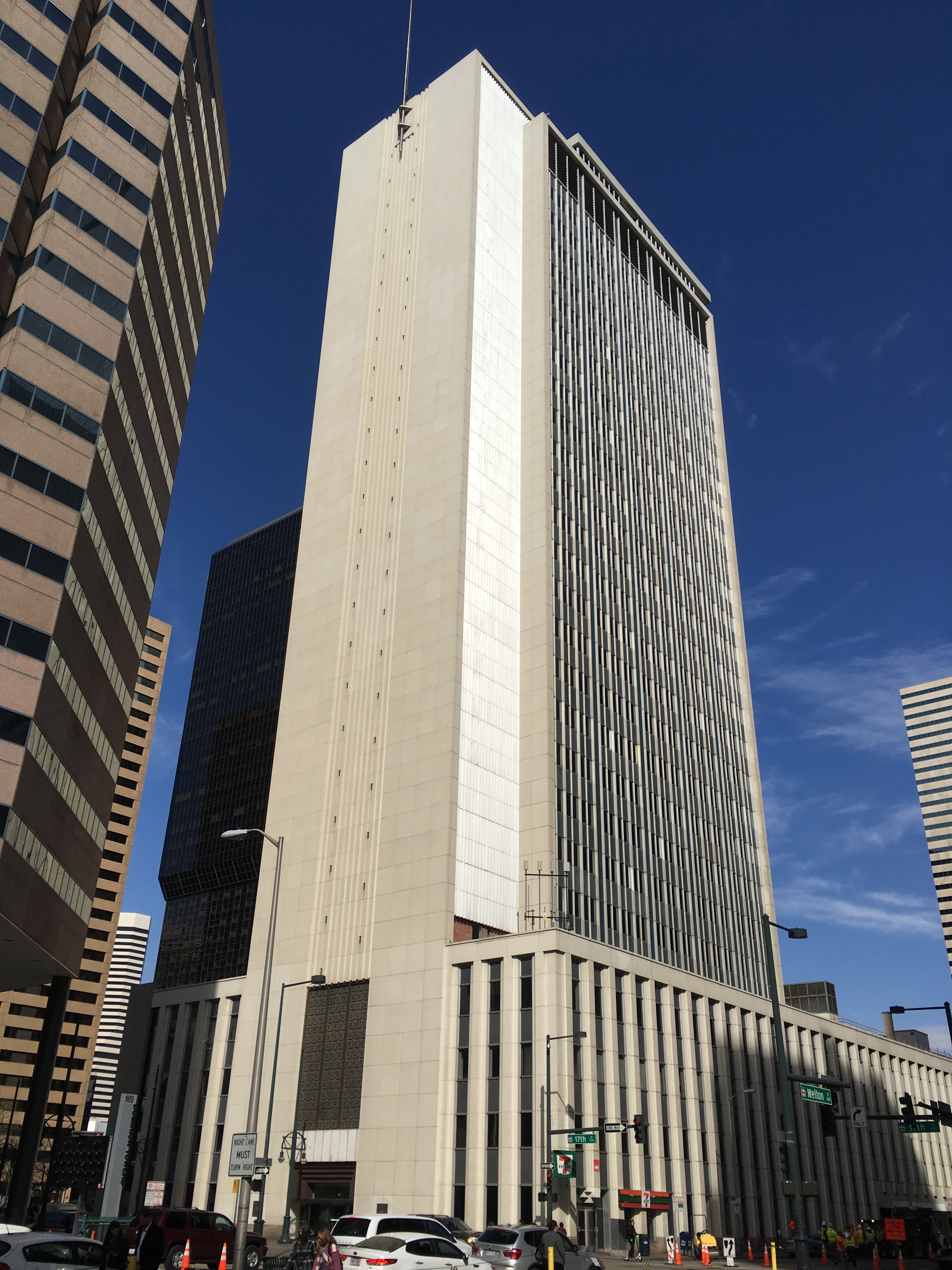
First Interstate Tower South -- Denver

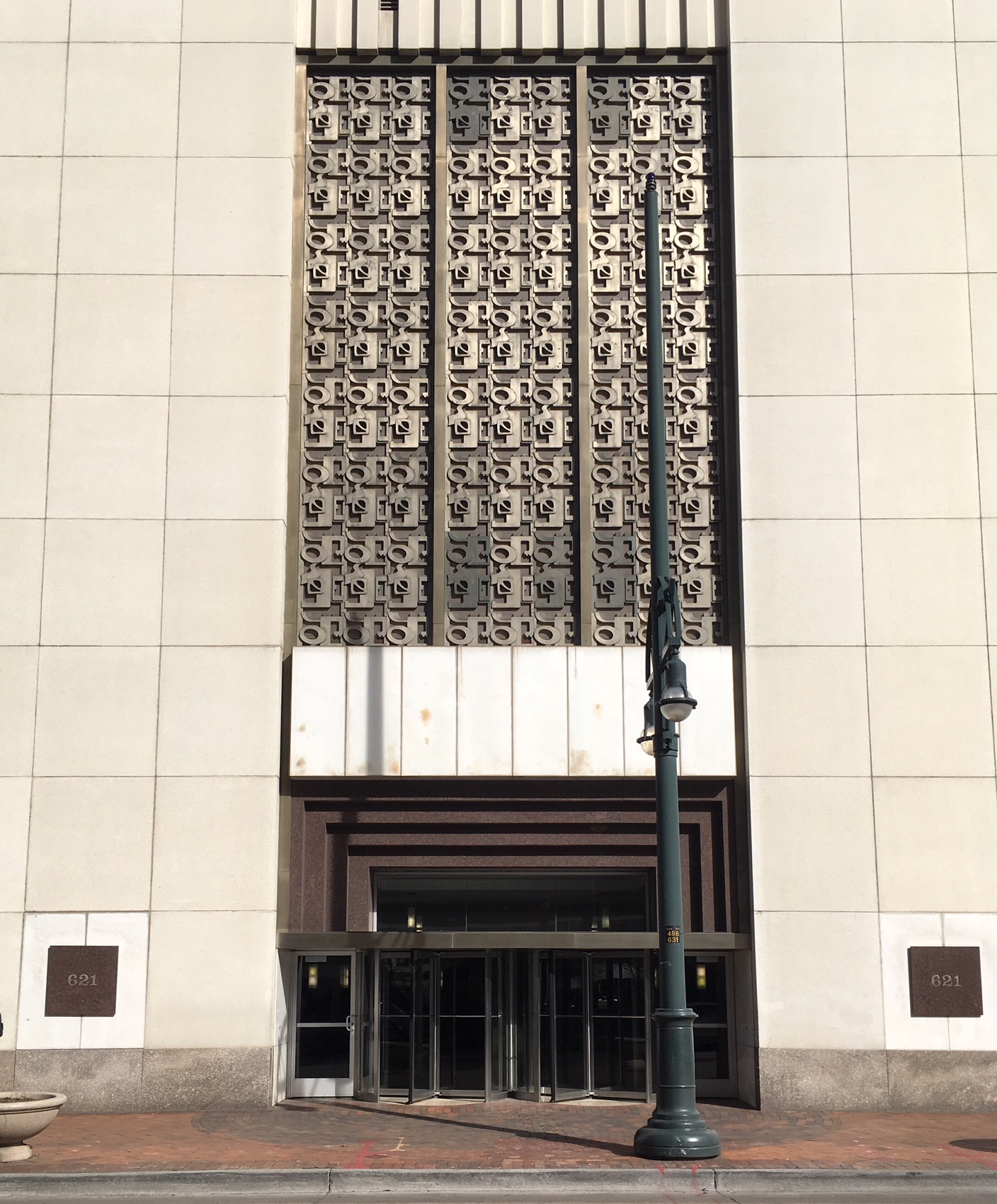
Entrance Detail - 621 17th Street, Denver

== See also ==
- List of tallest buildings in Denver

Preceded by Daniels & Fisher Tower	Tallest Building in Denver; 1957—1968; 117m	Succeeded by Brooks Towers
