= First Interstate Center (disambiguation) =

First Interstate Center may refer to:

- First Interstate Center, in Billings, Montana, United States, operated by the First Interstate BancSystem
- First Interstate Center (Missoula, Montana), U.S.
- First Interstate Center for the Arts, a theatre in Spokane, Washington

It may also refer to buildings of First Interstate BancSystem's predecessor, the former First Interstate Bancorp:

- Wells Fargo Center (Portland, Oregon), formerly named First Interstate Tower or First Interstate Center
- Wells Fargo Center (Seattle), formerly named First Interstate Center

== See also ==
- First Interstate Tower (disambiguation)
