= Walton Stinson =

American sound engineer

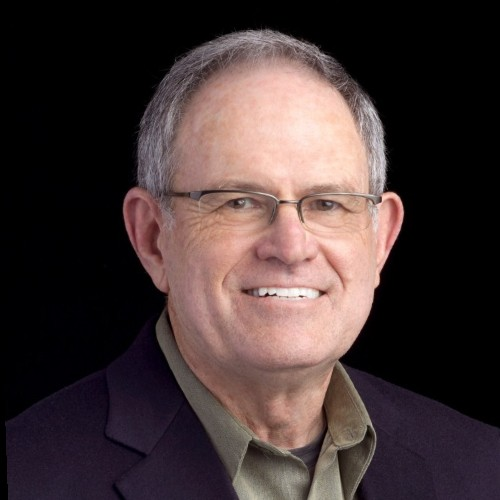
- Stinson top 10 consumer electronics specialty dealers in the USA
- Born: July 2, 1948 (age 78); United States
- Occupations: Sound engineer, business executive, and entrepreneur
- Known for: Helped introduce digital audio to the United States
- Call sign: W0CP

Walton Stinson (born July 2, 1948) is an American sound engineer, business executive, and entrepreneur. In 1982, Stinson helped introduce digital audio to the United States. He is co-founder and CEO of ListenUp, a privately held Colorado-based company that in 2019 was the 10th largest consumer electronics specialty dealer in the US. He co-founded the company, an audio-video retailer and systems integrator, in 1972 with Steven Weiner and Mary Kay Stinson. His work has also included concert sound engineering, recording and broadcasting, and consumer electronics industry leadership.

Stinson was inducted into the Consumer Electronics Hall of Fame in 2009, along with Apple co-founder Steve Jobs, Irwin M. Jacobs, former Chairman of Qualcomm, and Richard E. Wiley, former chairman of the Federal Communications Commission (FCC).

== Career ==
In 1973, Stinson established a concert recording and broadcasting operation at Ebbets Field (rock club). He arranged for performances to be broadcast live or recorded for subsequent transmission on local radio stations, including KFML (FM) and KBPI. Stinson, Weiner, and audio engineer Norm Simmer recorded performances using two-track reel-to-reel equipment. ListenUp subsequently developed a mobile recording studio.

ListenUp employee Phil Murray later restored and digitally transferred the original concert tapes. Stinson produced the original concert recordings subsequently released in the four-volume Live From Ebbets Field CD series, featuring artists including John Prine, Willie Nelson, Peter Frampton, Muddy Waters, Little Feat, and Taj Mahal (musician).

In 1982, he served as a delegate to the Compact Disc Group. Along with his partner, Steven Weiner, he traveled to Japan in October 1982 to obtain the first batch of compact discs and convinced Sony and Nippon Columbia (Denon) to provide him with the first available players. At a promotional event for CDs in Denver on March 13, 1983, at Rainbow Music Hall, he fooled an audience of 1,000 into believing they were listening to a live band, Grub Stake, when he segued the live performance into a digital recording of the band mid-performance to demonstrate the “live quality” of digital reproduction.

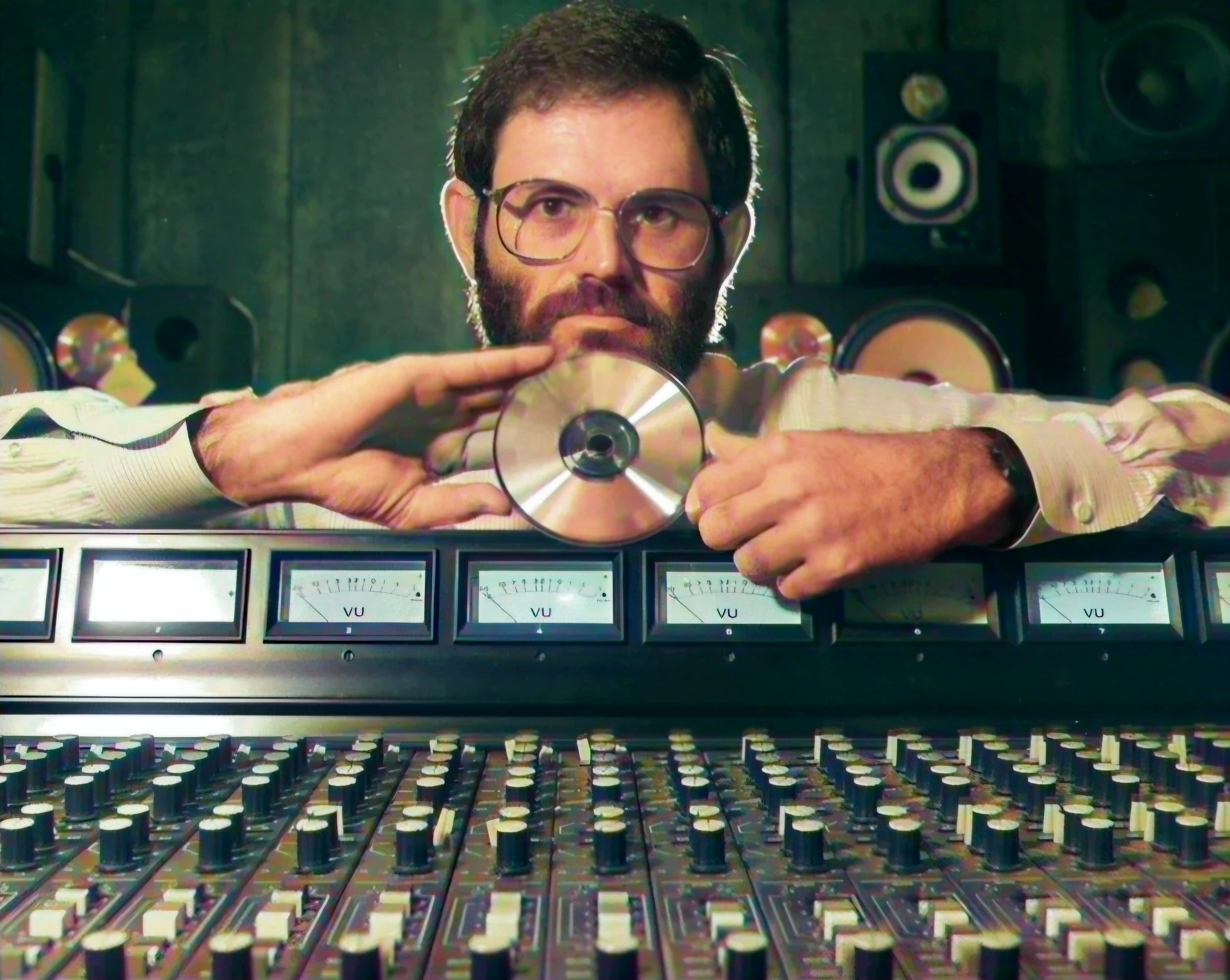
Walt Stinson Founder of ListenUp, 1983

In the words of Greg Milner, author of Perfecting Sound Forever, An Aural History of Recorded Music: “People like Stinson were the grassroots end of a publicity and marketing juggernaut that, in the space of a few years, transformed the CD from an expensive curiosity into the dominant music media.”

Stinson incorporated dramatic stunts into his advocacy for CDs, highlighting their durability and reliability. During a gathering at the Gates Planetarium in Denver, he demonstrated this by smearing peanut butter and jelly on a CD, scribing it with a knife, then rinsing it in water and showing its flawless playback.

In 2010, Home Entertainment Source (HES) merged with ProGroup to form ProSource, the largest consumer electronics buying group in North America, with over $5.5 Billion in sales. In 2021, Stinson was elected chairman of ProSource.

== Personal life ==
Stinson has been a lifelong amateur radio enthusiast since the age of 10, also known as ham radio, with call sign W0CP.

In October 1983, during the United States invasion of Grenada, codenamed Operation Urgent Fury, Stinson communicated via amateur radio with medical student Mark Baratella, who was based in Grenada. Baratella had hidden his ham radio gear at the start of the coup in a body bag in the medical school's anatomy lab. Operating from his room at the Grand Anse campus of Saint George's Medical School, Baratella became an essential link between the island and the rest of the world — as a source of news and vital information. With telephone services down from the conflict, Stinson kept the media informed about the movements of Cuban troops, evacuation arrangements, and the safety and welfare of the medical students on the Grenada campuses, of which 120 American students were unaccounted for.
