= ListenUp =

Independent audio/video retailer and sound company

- Company type: Private
- Industry: Consumer Electronics
- Founded: October 10, 1972
- Founders: Walton Stinson, Steven Weiner, Mary Kay Stinson
- Headquarters: Denver, United States
- Number of locations: 5
- Key people: Walton Stinson (Executive Chairman) Ben Larkin (President)
- Products: Building automation; Home audio; System Integration; Consumer Electronics; Electrical contractor
- Website: listenup.com

ListenUp is an independent audio/video retailer and systems integrator founded in Denver, Colorado, in 1972 by Walton Stinson, Mary Kay Stinson and Steven Weiner, graduates of Knox College (Illinois).

In the early 1980s, ListenUp was instrumental in launching the compact disc (CD) into the US market. The first commercially available compact disc players were shown at the Sony booth at the 1982 Japan Audio Fair. Stinson and Weiner both attended and brought back discs and technical information. On returning from Japan, Stinson was questioned by US customs about “the shiny discs” in his luggage.

Lacking funds to purchase advertising, Stinson and Weiner produced live broadcasts of concerts from Ebbets Field, a downtown Denver nightclub, for two Denver radio stations in return for an on-air credit, with the phrase “Sound by ListenUp.” Ebbets Field was Denver's premier music venue of the 1970s and Billboard (magazine) named it Club of the Year in 1975 and 1976. ListenUp produced broadcasts and recorded artist at Ebbets Field from 1973 to 1977. They released a four-CD set of “Live from Ebbets Field” concert recordings by artists such as Taj Mahal (musician), Dan Fogelberg, Joan Armatrading, Doc Watson, Peter Frampton, Muddy Waters, Willie Nelson, and Little Feat.

ListenUp created the sound system for and produced live broadcasts and recordings from the Rainbow Music Hall, a concert venue operated by Barry Fey and Chuck Morris, from 1979 through 1988.

In 2019 ListenUp was the 10th largest consumer electronics specialty dealer in the US and had garnered 12% of consumer electronics share among the top 100 consumer-direct sales businesses, alongside Apple Inc., Bose Corporation and Video & Audio Center.

ListenUp co-founder, Walt Stinson, was one of two audio engineers in 2009 inducted into the Consumer Electronics Hall of Fame. According to the Consumer Technology Association, the Hall of Fame recognizes consumer technology pioneers whose "Insights and hard work have delivered to consumers, worldwide, the technologies, products and services that enrich lives and livelihoods while furthering human security and wellbeing.”
