= Rainbow Music Hall =

Music venue in Denver, Colorado

- Interactive map of Rainbow Music Hall
- Address: 6360 E. Evans; Denver, Colorado; United States
- Coordinates: 39°40′41″N 104°54′50″W
- Operator: Barry Fey
- Capacity: 1,485

Construction
- Opened: 1979; 47 years ago
- Closed: 1989; 37 years ago

The Rainbow Music Hall was a 1,485-capacity music venue located in Denver, Colorado. The venue opened in 1979 by concert promoter Barry Fey and closed in 1989. Many famous artists performed at the Rainbow Music Hall, including:

- Journey,
- Accept,
- AC/DC,
- Adrian Belew,
- April Wine,
- Bob Dylan,
- Berlin,
- B.B. King,
- Elvin Bishop,
- Black Flag,
- Blackfoot,
- Blondie
- Bobby & The Midnights,
- David Bromberg,
- Savoy Brown,
- Roy Buchanan,
- The Call,
- The Charlie Daniels Band,
- Cheech & Chong,
- Cheap Trick,
- Stanley Clarke,
- John Cougar,
- The Cult,
- The Cure,
- The Damned,
- Miles Davis,
- Def Leppard,
- Rick Derringer,
- DEVO,
- The Dinosaurs,
- The Dirt Band,
- Dixie Dregs,
- Bob Dylan,
- The English Beat,
- Erasure,
- Firefall,
- Gamma,
- Greg Kihn Band,
- Jean-Luc Ponty,
- Jessie Colin Young,
- Jerry Garcia,
- J. Geils Band,
- Judas Priest,
- Gentle Giant,
- Bruce Hornsby,
- Joe Jackson,
- Al Jarreau,
- Howard Jones,
- The Knack,
- Leo Kottke,
- Lonnie Mack,
- McGuinn, Clark & Hillman,
- Meat Loaf,
- Jim Messina,
- Metallica,
- Midnight Oil,
- Minutemen,
- Ozzy Osbourne,
- Katy Moffatt,
- Willie Nelson,
- Siouxsie and the Banshees,
- Stevie Nicks,
- Graham Parker,
- Tom Petty,
- The Police,
- The Pretenders,
- Prince,
- John Prine,
- The Psychedelic Furs,
- Rainbow,
- The Ramones,
- Randy Hansen,
- Bonnie Raitt,
- Reconstruction, Red Hot Chili Peppers,
- R.E.M.,
- Roxy Music,
- Siouxsie and the banshees,
- The Specials,
- Rick Springfield,
- Spirit,
- Steppenwolf,
- Thin Lizzy,
- Peter Tosh,
- Tanya Tucker,
- U2
- Shooting Star
- Suzanne Vega,
- Stevie Ray Vaughan,
- Tom Waits,
- Jerry Jeff Walker,
- Wall of Voodoo,
- Johnny Winter,
- Warren Zevon,
- Zephyr (band),
- 38 Special
- Anthrax
- Pat Benatar

On May 9, 1979, Journey recorded a live performance. The concert followed the release of their 5th studio LP Evolution; released March 20, 1979.

Many of the early performances were recorded by local audio/video company ListenUp, which was instrumental in the 1980s in introducing compact discs to the US market for the first time. At one memorable concert at Rainbow Music Hall, ListenUp CEO, Walton Stinson tricked an audience of 1,000 into believing they were listening to a live performance of the band Grub Stake, but had segued the performance into a digital recording mid-performance to demonstrate the superior quality of digital audio over analog technology.
