= 633 17th Street =

Skyscraper in Denver, Colorado

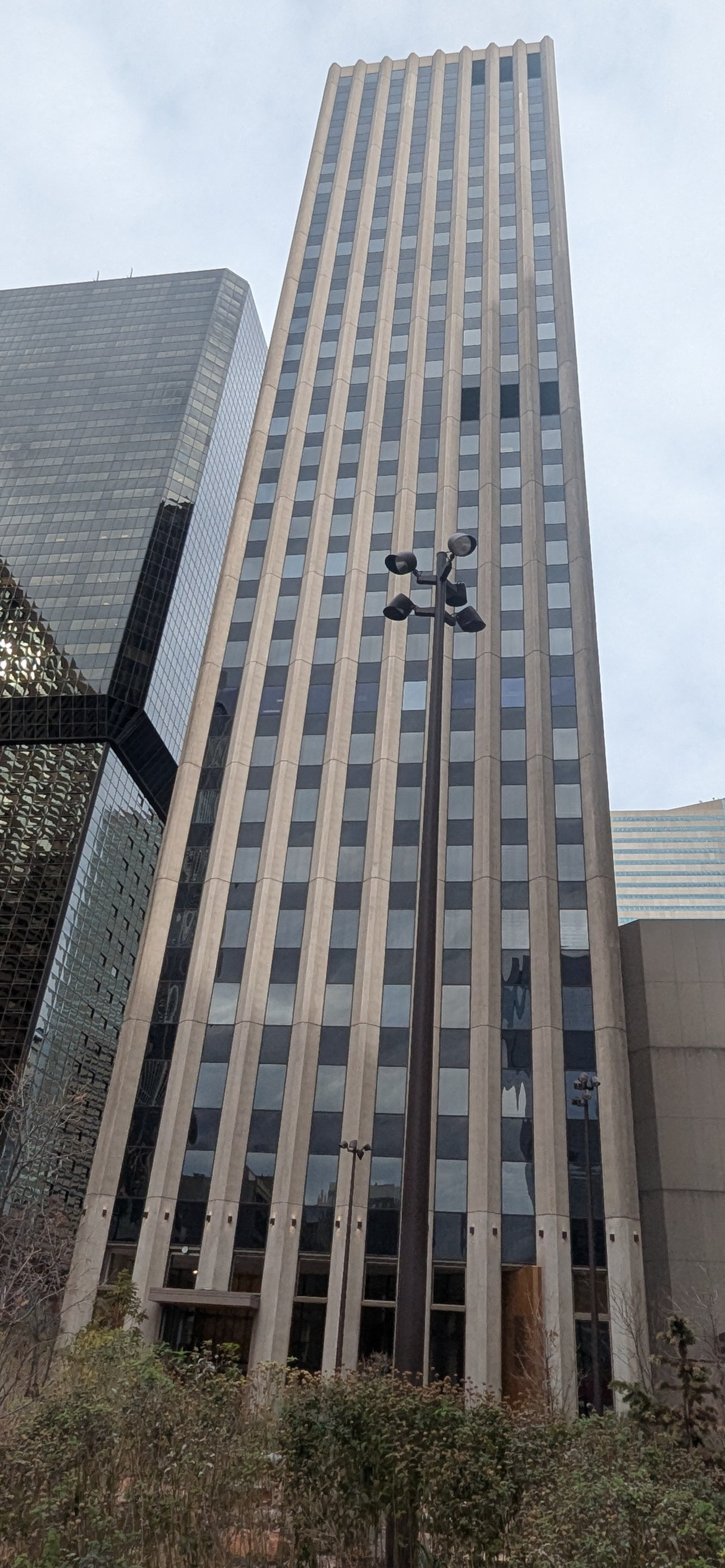
- 633 17th Street Denver from the front entrance along 17th st.
- Interactive map of the 633 17th Street area

General information
- Status: Completed
- Type: Office
- Location: 633 17th Street, Denver, Colorado, United States
- Coordinates: 39.746599°N 104.989919°W
- Opening: 1974

Height
- Roof: 434 ft (132 m)

Technical details
- Floor count: 32
- Floor area: 541,403 sq ft (50,298.0 m^{2})

Design and construction
- Developer: Derr Steel Erection Company, Cushman & Wakefield, Inc.

633 17th Street, formerly known as the First Interstate Tower North, is a high-rise building in Denver, Colorado. The building was completed in 1974, and rises 32 floors and 434 feet (132 m) in height. The building stands as the twelfth-tallest building in Denver and Colorado. It also stood as the tallest building in the city at the time of its 1974 completion, and held that distinction for four years until it was surpassed by the 507-foot (155 m) 555 17th Street in 1978.

At the time of its completion, 633 17th Street was known as "First Interstate Tower North" after First Interstate Bancorp, its primary tenant. After First Interstate merged with Wells Fargo in 1996, the building's address became its official name. First Interstate Tower North was built adjacent to the pre-existing First Interstate Tower South, now known as 621 17th Street, which rises 386 feet (118 m) in height. The two buildings together form the First of Denver Plaza.

Exterior shots of the building were used in the opening credits of the television series Dynasty

In 2025 real estate developer Asher Luzzatto purchased the entire city block containing 633 & 621 17th St. for $3.2M. A residential conversion is planned for both buildings.

== See also ==
- List of tallest buildings in Denver

Preceded by Brooks Towers	Tallest Building in Denver; 1974—1978; 132m	Succeeded by 555 17th Street
