= Brooks Tower =

Residential skyscraper Denver, Colorado

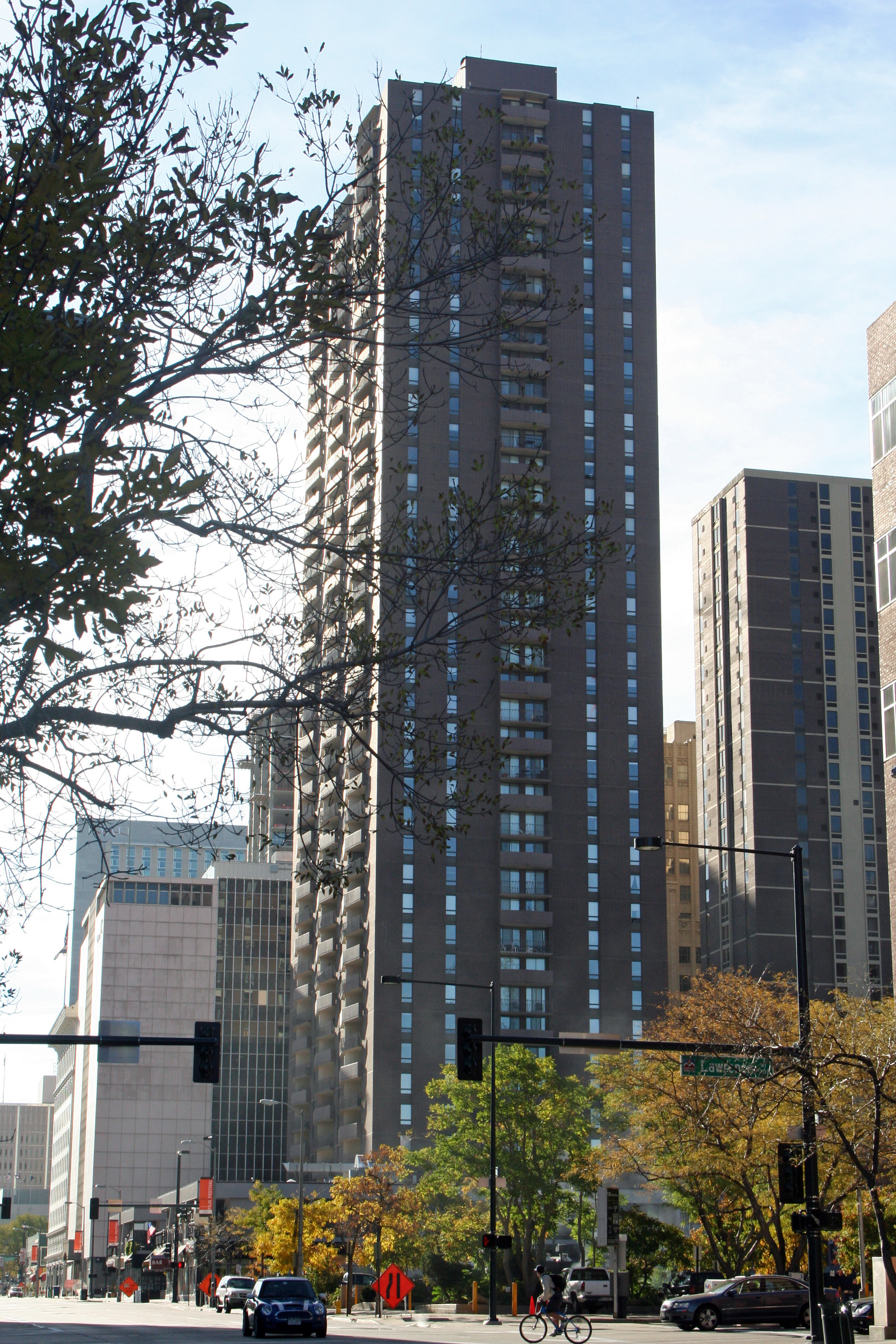
- Brooks Tower in Denver

General information
- Type: Condominiums (formerly Apartments)
- Architectural style: Modern
- Location: 1020 15th Street; Denver, Colorado; USA
- Coordinates: 39°44′47.93″N 104°59′47.29″W
- Construction started: June 8, 1966
- Completed: 1968
- Owner: Various (Condominium ownership)

Height
- Height: 420 ft (130 m)

Technical details
- Floor count: 42

Design and construction
- Architect: Max Ratner
- Developer: Brooks Realty and Construction Company (Aaron Brooks)
- Structural engineer: Karl R. Rohrer Associates
- Services engineer: Karl R. Rohrer Associates
- Main contractor: Hunkin-Conkey Construction Company

Website
- brookstower.net

Brooks Tower is a 42-story, 420-foot (130 m) residential skyscraper at 1020 15th Street in downtown Denver, Colorado, completed in 1968. It was designed by Cleveland architect Max Ratner and developed by the Brooks Realty and Construction Company.

Brooks Tower was Denver's first high-rise residential building and its tallest building until 1974, when it was surpassed by 633 17th Street. The tower was originally built as rental apartments, and was converted into condominiums in 1995.

As of late 2023, it ranks as the 15th-tallest building in Denver.

== History ==
=== Development and construction ===
Brooks Tower occupies the former site of Denver's Mining and Exchange building. A 12-foot copper statue from the site, "The Old Prospector" (1891), remains in the building's front garden.

Aaron Brooks led the development through his company, Brooks Realty and Construction. The tower was designed by Ohio-based architect Max Ratner, with engineering by Karl R. Rohrer Associates, also of Ohio, and construction by the Hunkin-Conkey Construction Company.

Construction began June 8, 1966, under an initial $7.6 million contract. Delays from labor disputes, weather, and owner-requested changes led to a legal dispute between the Brooks Towers Corporation and Hunkin-Conkey Construction. Court records show the architect granted the contractor 215 days of extensions. The tower was mostly complete around June 1, 1968, and formally opened in February 1969.

=== Opening ===
Brooks Tower was the tallest building in Denver and the Rocky Mountain region from its opening in 1968, to 1974, when 633 17th Street (then the First National Bank Building) was completed. A February 1969 article in The Denver Post described the building's site as having changed from a "shoddy slum to busy zone."

The second floor of Brooks Tower housed Ebbets Field, a Denver music venue co-founded by concert promoters Chuck Morris and Barry Fey, from 1973 to 1977. Billboard magazine named it Club of the Year in 1975 and 1976.

=== Condominium conversion ===
In 1995, Brooks Tower transitioned from being a rental apartment building to a condominium complex. The Rocky Mountain News reported it as the largest condominium conversion project in Denver's history up to that point, with 517 units involved.

== Architecture and amenities ==
Brooks Tower is a cylindrical modern-style building. Its shape was designed to give residents panoramic views of downtown Denver and the Rocky Mountains.

Residential units range from studios to penthouses. Amenities include an outdoor swimming pool, a fitness center, and 24-hour front desk. The ground level contains commercial and retail space.

== See also ==
- List of tallest buildings in Denver
- Modern architecture
- 633 17th Street
- Ebbets Field (rock club)

Preceded by Denver's Mining and Exchange Building	Tallest Building in Denver; 1968–1974	Succeeded by 633 17th Street
