= List of condo hotels in the United States =

This is a list of condo hotels located in the United States.

- 900 North Michigan
- Aqua
- Bridgman's View Tower
- Conrad Fort Lauderdale
- Cosmopolitan of Las Vegas
- Edison Condominiums
- EPIC Miami Residences and Hotel
- Four Seasons Hotel Denver
- Four Seasons Hotel Miami
- Hotel Valley Ho
- L.A. Live
- Mandarin Oriental - Atlanta, Georgia
- Mandeville Place
- Old Chicago Main Post Office Twin Towers
- Park Tower - Chicago, Illinois
- Plaza Hotel
- Residences at Mandarin Oriental
- The Residences Providence
- Ritz-Carlton Denver
- The Signature at MGM Grand
- Soleil Center
- South Station Tower
- Three PNC Plaza
- Trump Hotel Las Vegas
- Trump International Hotel and Tower - Chicago, Illinois
- Trump International Hotel and Tower - Honolulu, Hawaii
- Trump International Hotel and Tower - New Orleans, Louisiana
- Trump International Hotel and Tower - New York City, New York
- Trump SoHo
- Victory Tower
- W Boston Hotel and Residences
- W New York Downtown Hotel and Residences
- Waldorf Astoria Chicago
- Waldorf-Astoria Hotel and Residence Tower
- Wanda Vista
- Water Tower Place
- Westin Book Cadillac Hotel
- Wolf Point South Tower

== See also ==
- List of condominiums in the United States
- List of condo hotels in Canada
