= Mandalay Bay =

Casino resort in Paradise, Nevada

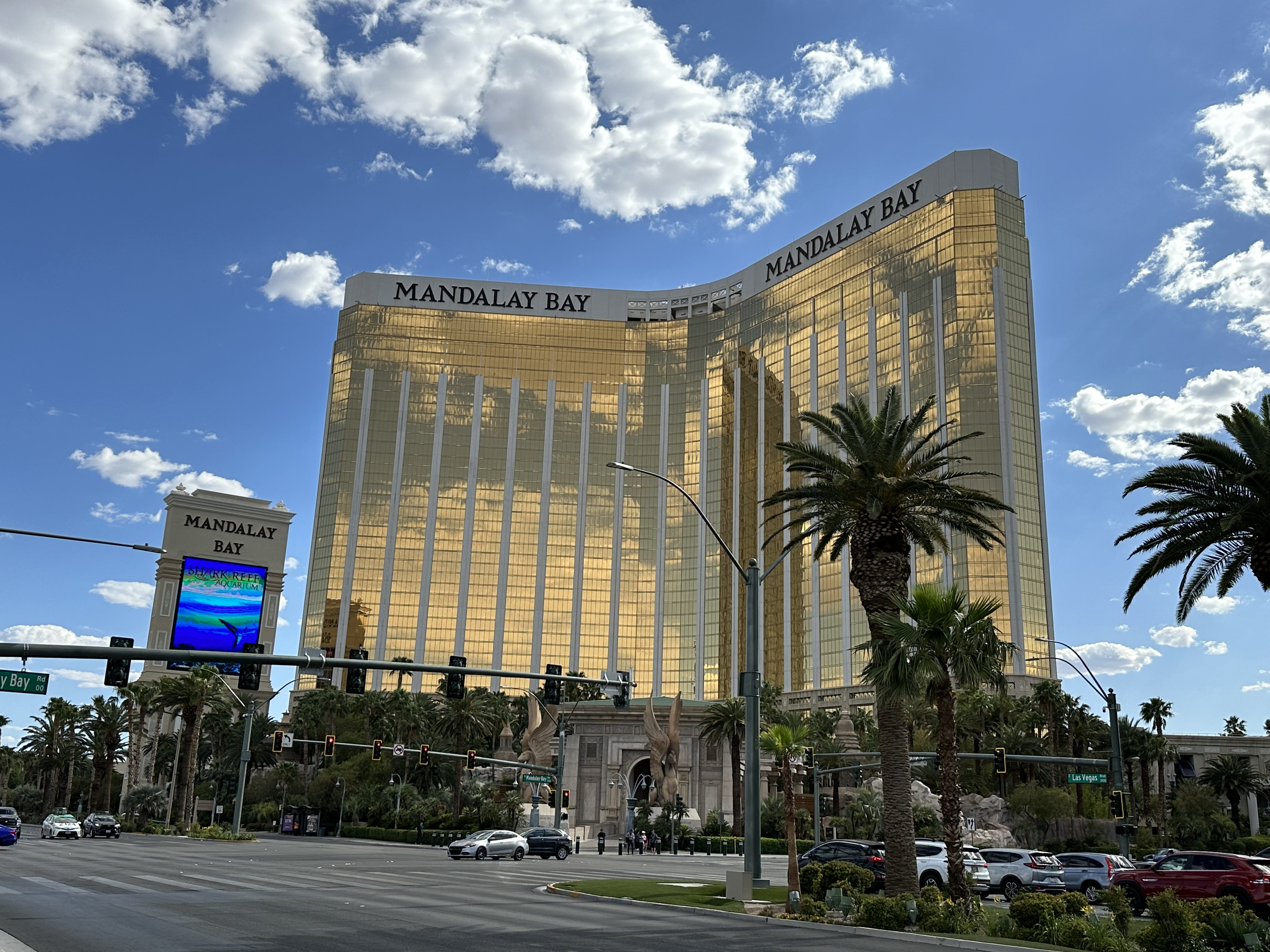

- Location within Las Vegas Strip Location within Nevada
- Interactive map of Mandalay Bay
- Location: Paradise, Nevada, U.S.; 3950 South Las Vegas Boulevard; 36°5′30″N 115°10′29″W
- Opened: March 2, 1999; 27 years ago
- Theme: Tropical
- No. of rooms: 3,209
- Gaming space: 147,992 sq ft (13,748.9 m^{2})
- Permanent shows: Chicago (1999–2000); Mamma Mia! (2003–2009); The Lion King (2009–2011); Michael Jackson: One
- Signature attractions: Mandalay Bay Convention Center; Michelob Ultra Arena; Shark Reef; House of Blues; Mandalay Bay Beach; The Shoppes at Mandalay Place
- Notable restaurants: Aureole (1999–2023); Fleur (2004–2023); Lupo (1999–2023); Red Square (1999–2019); StripSteak; Border Grill
- Casino type: Land-based
- Owner: Vici Properties
- Operating license holder: MGM Resorts International
- Renovated in: 2003, 2006, 2012–13, 2015–16
- Website: mandalaybay.com

Mandalay Bay is a 43-story luxury resort and casino at the south end of the Las Vegas Strip in Paradise, Nevada. It is owned by Vici Properties and operated by MGM Resorts International. It was developed by Circus Circus Enterprises and completed at a cost of $950 million. It opened on March 2, 1999, on the former site of the Hacienda hotel-casino. MGM acquired Mandalay Bay in 2005, and the Blackstone Group became a co-owner in 2020. Vici acquired MGM's ownership stake in 2022.

Mandalay Bay has a tropical South Seas theme and covers 120 acres (49 ha). It includes a 147,992 sq ft (13,748.9 m^{2}) casino and 3,209 rooms. The 43-story tower includes a Four Seasons hotel, which has rooms on floors 35 through 39. It is managed separately from the Mandalay Bay hotel. In 1999, the Four Seasons became the first Las Vegas hotel to win the AAA Five Diamond Award.

Several additions opened in 2003, including the Mandalay Bay Convention Center, and a second hotel tower, W Las Vegas. It has 1,117 rooms, and was renamed W Las Vegas in 2024. A shopping mall, Mandalay Place, was also added in 2003. Other features include a House of Blues club, the Shark Reef aquatic attraction, and an events center known as Michelob Ultra Arena. The resort also has an 1,800-seat theater, which has hosted several Broadway shows, including Chicago (1999–2000), Mamma Mia! (2003–2009), and The Lion King (2009–2011). Since 2013, the theater has hosted Michael Jackson: One.

On October 1, 2017, gunman Stephen Paddock opened fire from the hotel's 32nd floor, killing 60 people in attendance at an outdoor music festival nearby. It is the deadliest mass shooting by a lone gunman in U.S. history to date.

== History ==
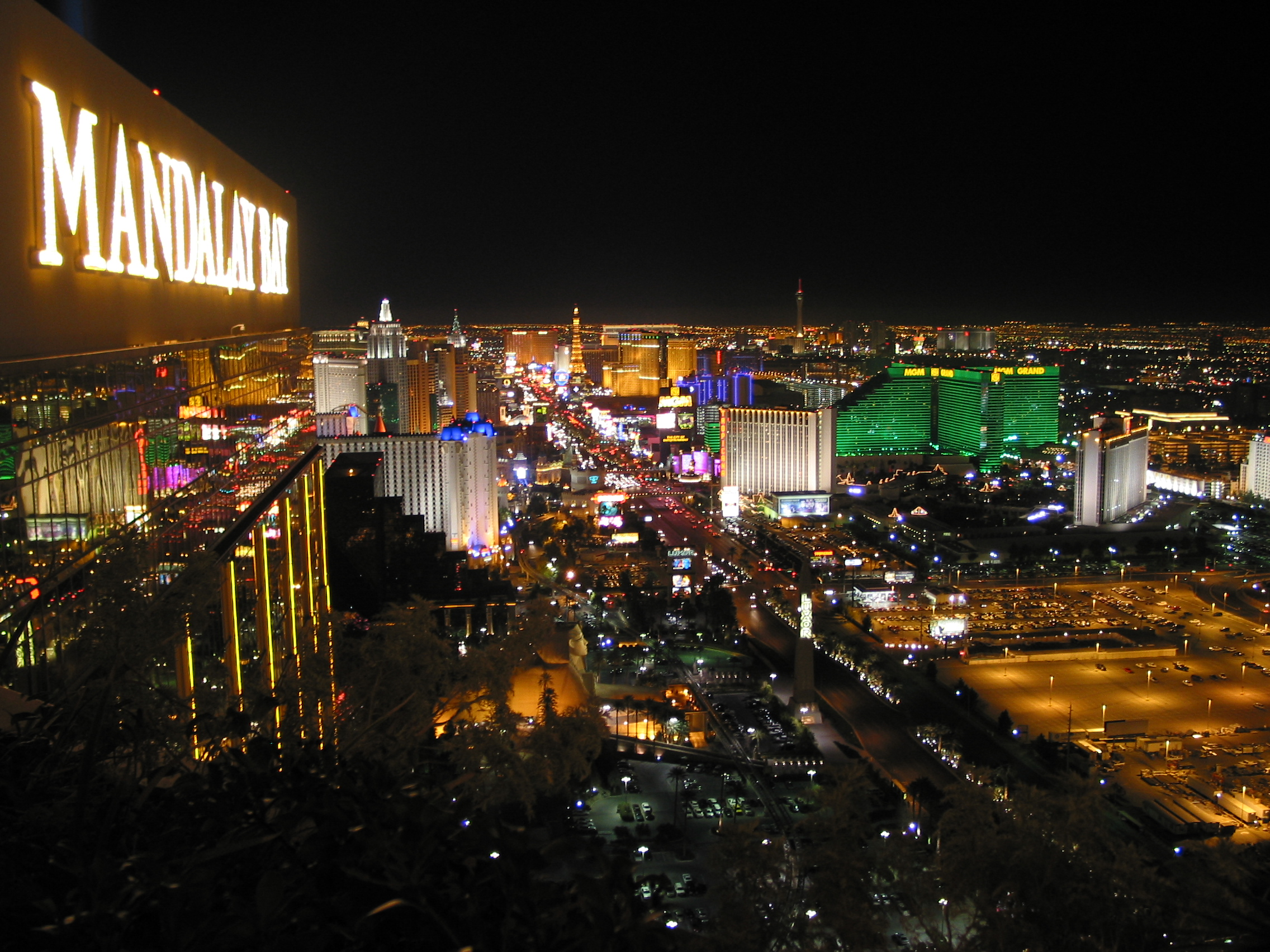
View from the Mandalay Bay hotel looking north (2003)

Mandalay Bay was built on the former site of the Hacienda hotel and casino at the southern end of the Las Vegas Strip. In 1995, Circus Circus Enterprises purchased the Hacienda for $80 million and an adjacent 74-acre (30 ha) site, directly south, for $73 million. That June, plans were announced for a new resort project, tentatively known as Millennium, to replace the Hacienda.

The Hacienda closed on December 1, 1996, and was demolished on New Year's Eve. Details about its replacement were unveiled on the same day; the tropical-themed resort, now known under the working title "Project Paradise", had an estimated budget of $800 million to $1 billion, with completion expected by the end of 1998. The target clientele would be higher-end compared to Circus' prior resorts, competing against The Mirage and new properties such as the Venetian and Paris resorts. It was planned as part of a larger project known as the Masterplan Mile, a complex which would include two other new resorts by Circus, although these never materialized.

Construction on Project Paradise began in 1997. Problems arose during construction in mid-1998, because of excessive and uneven settling of the soil beneath the resort; the core of the building sank by 17 inches (430 mm), while one of the wings had settled by only 2 inches (51 mm). Rumors about the severity of the issues depressed Circus Circus's stock price. The problem was solved by installing 536 micropiles (200-foot-long metal pipes filled with grout, each capped with a hydraulic jack) below the building, at an estimated cost of $8 million to $10 million. The damage from the settling was limited to minor cracks in the resort's valet parking facility.

In February 1998, the project was officially named Mandalay Bay, after the city of Mandalay in Myanmar. The name was also chosen to evoke the exotic tropical romanticism of the poem "Mandalay" by Rudyard Kipling. More than a dozen names had been considered for the resort. Mandalay Bay cost $950 million to build, making it the most expensive project to date for Circus Circus. The company expected to spend more than $10 million on a print and television advertising campaign in the months leading up to the resort's opening.

Mandalay Bay opened at 10:00 p.m. on March 2, 1999, following a private opening for VIPs earlier in the day that included numerous celebrities. Grand opening festivities included the Blues Brothers (Dan Aykroyd, James Belushi, and John Goodman) leading a procession of 200 motorcycles to Mandalay Bay's front doors. Later, they performed at the resort's House of Blues club, as did Bob Dylan. Mandalay Bay employed 5,000 people, with 30 percent coming from other Circus Circus properties. The company changed its name to Mandalay Resort Group later in 1999, reflecting Mandalay Bay as its flagship property.

In 2002, Mandalay Bay sought approval from the U.S. and Chinese governments to import two panda bears for exhibit at the resort. The property would build a glass-domed structure for the animals, next to the resort's Shark Reef aquatic attraction and away from the casino floor. The panda exhibit would generate up to $50 million a year, which would be given to the Chinese government to further conservation efforts for the species. Critics viewed the proposed exhibit as an exploitative way to attract casino patrons. Ultimately, the resort did not gain approval to import the animals.

In 2003, the resort added a convention center and a second hotel tower. Two years later, the resort was bought by MGM Mirage as part of its acquisition of Mandalay Resort Group. In 2006, Mandalay Bay was investigated by the U.S. Department of Justice over complaints that the resort failed to comply with the Americans with Disabilities Act of 1990. The property eventually spent $20 million to correct the entry doors of 3,000 hotel rooms, as they were deemed too narrow. The resort's first major renovation began in late 2012, and continued into the next year, improving various areas of the property.

Stunt performer Andy Lewis achieved a new slacklining record at Mandalay Bay in 2013, walking 360 feet across a loose rope situated 480 feet above the property.

In January 2020, Mandalay Bay was named the pre- and post-game venue for the Las Vegas Raiders, an NFL team that plays at the Allegiant Stadium directly west of the resort. That month, MGM Resorts also announced that it would sell Mandalay Bay to a joint venture consisting of MGM Growth Properties and The Blackstone Group. MGM would own 50.1 percent of the joint venture, and Blackstone would own the remainder. Mandalay Bay would be leased to MGM Resorts, which would continue to operate the resort. The deal was finalized in February 2020. Vici Properties bought MGM Growth in April 2022, and then bought out Blackstone's stake in Mandalay Bay in January 2023.

=== 2017 mass shooting ===
On October 1, 2017, gunman Stephen Paddock opened fire from his room on the hotel's 32nd floor. He targeted concertgoers attending a music festival, located diagonally across from the resort. He killed 60 people and wounded approximately 867 others, before killing himself as authorities approached his room. The incident is the deadliest mass shooting by a lone gunman in U.S. history.

Mandalay Bay remained open following the shooting. Hospitality experts believed the massacre would have only a minimal impact on the resort's revenue. Several hundred workers, out of 7,400, were laid off as a result of decreased visitation due to the shooting. MGM had also paused its marketing of the resort after the incident, which contributed to profit losses. Finances gradually improved, with a near-full recovery in 2019.

Resort security was increased as a result of the shooting, while MGM announced that it had no plans to rent Paddock's suite out to future guests. Floors 31 through 34 were renumbered as 56 through 59. Numerous lawsuits were filed against MGM by the shooting survivors, alleging inadequate preventative measures at Mandalay Bay. The company and plaintiffs eventually settled for $800 million.

== Features ==
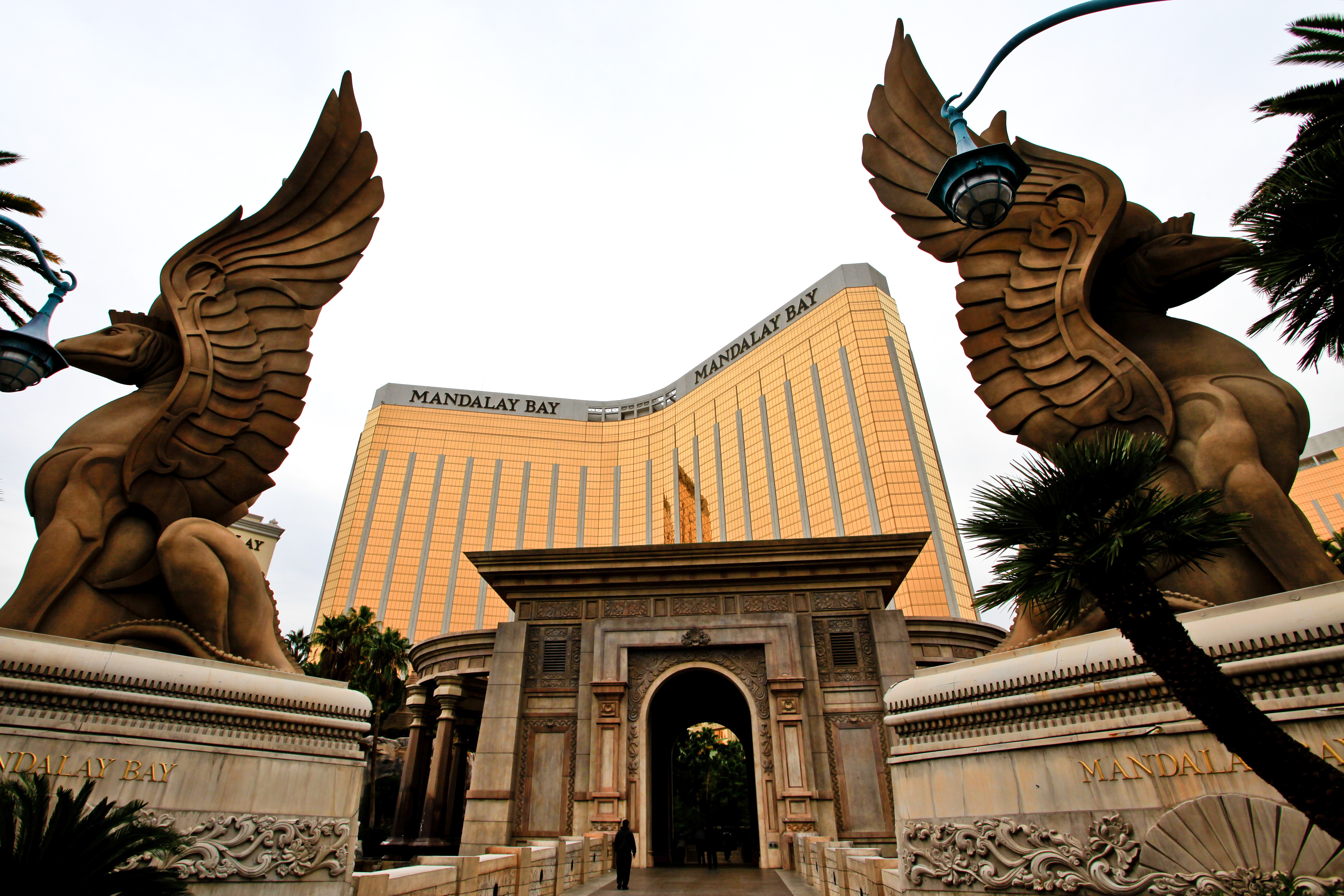
Exterior of entrance on Las Vegas Boulevard, featuring griffin statues.

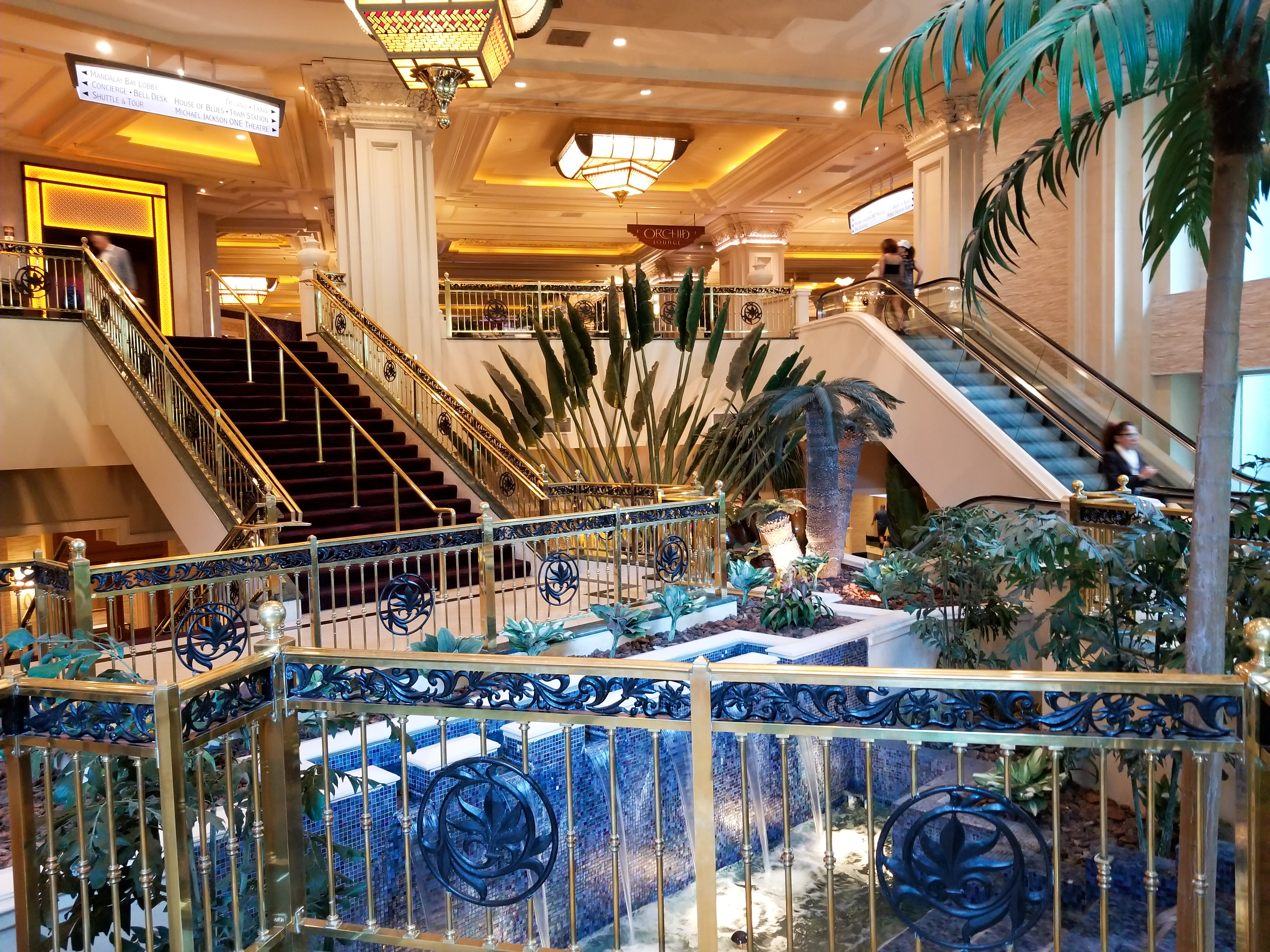
Interior entrance

The Mandalay Bay complex occupies 120 acres. The resort includes a 147,992 sq ft (13,748.9 m^{2}) casino. It initially opened with 135,000 sq ft (12,500 m^{2}) of gaming space, featuring 122 table games and 2,400 slot machines. As of 2006, the casino had one of the largest sports books in Las Vegas, with a wall of 31 television screens. The casino floor was renovated in 2013, with new carpeting and chairs added. The sports book was updated in 2018.

Mandalay Bay has a tropical South Seas theme. Water features, including numerous fountains, are present throughout the resort. The hotel lobby features a two-story aquarium containing 12,600 gallons of water. The resort also has an aquatic attraction known as Shark Reef, which includes a 1,300,000 US gal (4,900,000 L) aquarium. The $40 million facility opened on June 20, 2000, and contains the largest aquarium on the Strip, featuring mostly sharks.

The 12,000-seat Mandalay Bay Events Center opened on April 10, 1999, and was renamed the Michelob Ultra Arena in 2021. It has hosted numerous entertainers as well as sports games.

Construction on another facility, the Mandalay Bay Convention Center, began in 2001. Work was temporarily stopped due to the economic impact of the September 11 attacks. It eventually opened in January 2003, and is among the largest convention centers in the U.S. Convention business makes up a significant portion of the resort's revenue.

When it opened, the resort included the Treasures of Mandalay Bay Museum, which had a rare currencies exhibit worth more than $40 million. Exhibit items included two $100,000 bills, among only a handful known to still exist.

The Luxor and Excalibur resorts, also built by Mandalay Resort Group, are located north of Mandalay Bay. The term "Mandalay Mile" was created by company president Glenn Schaeffer in reference to the three resorts, which are connected via the Mandalay Bay Tram.

Mandalay Bay has a poker room with 10 tables and hosts both cash games and tournaments.

=== Hotels ===
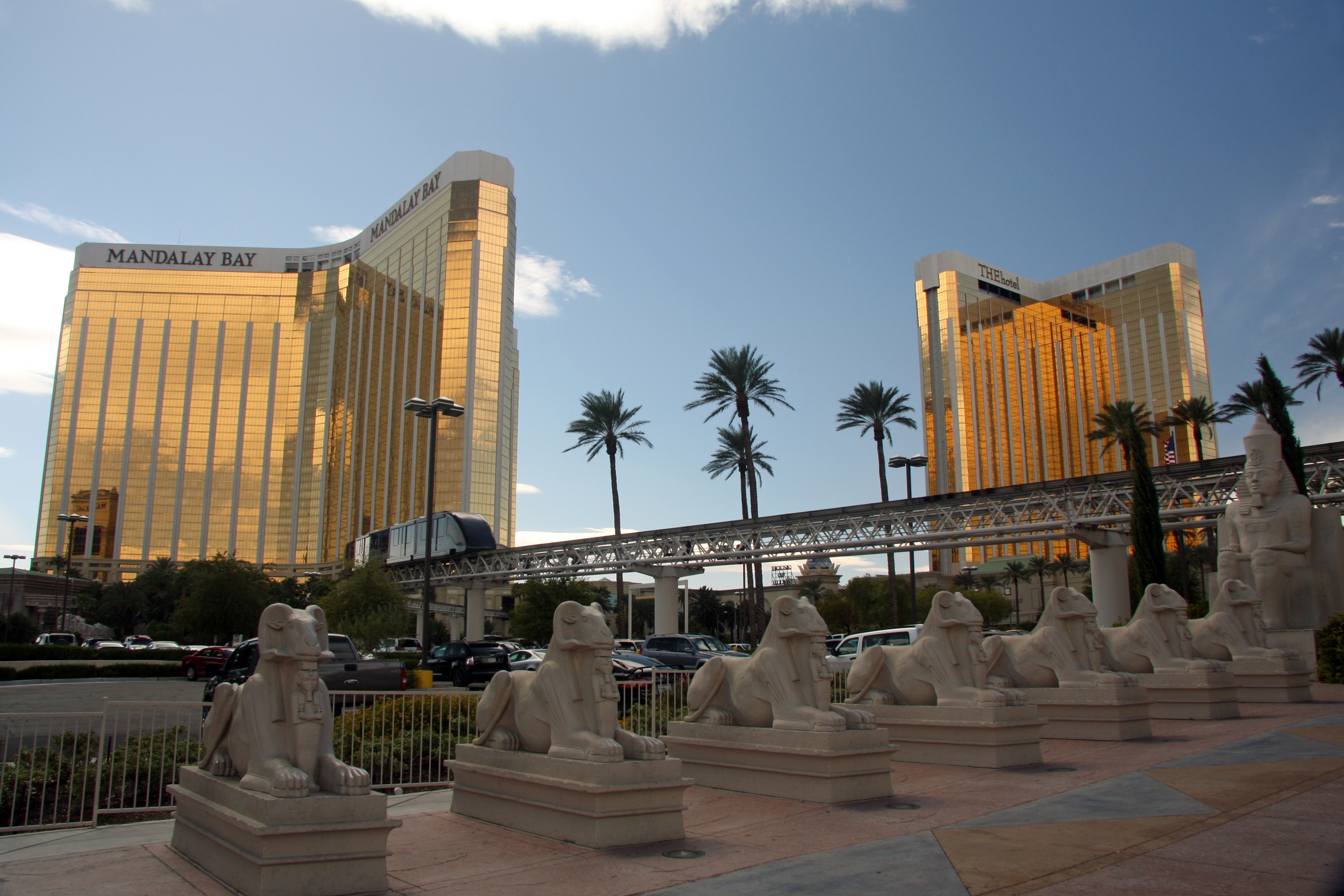
The property's hotel towers in 2009, with Luxor statues in the foreground.

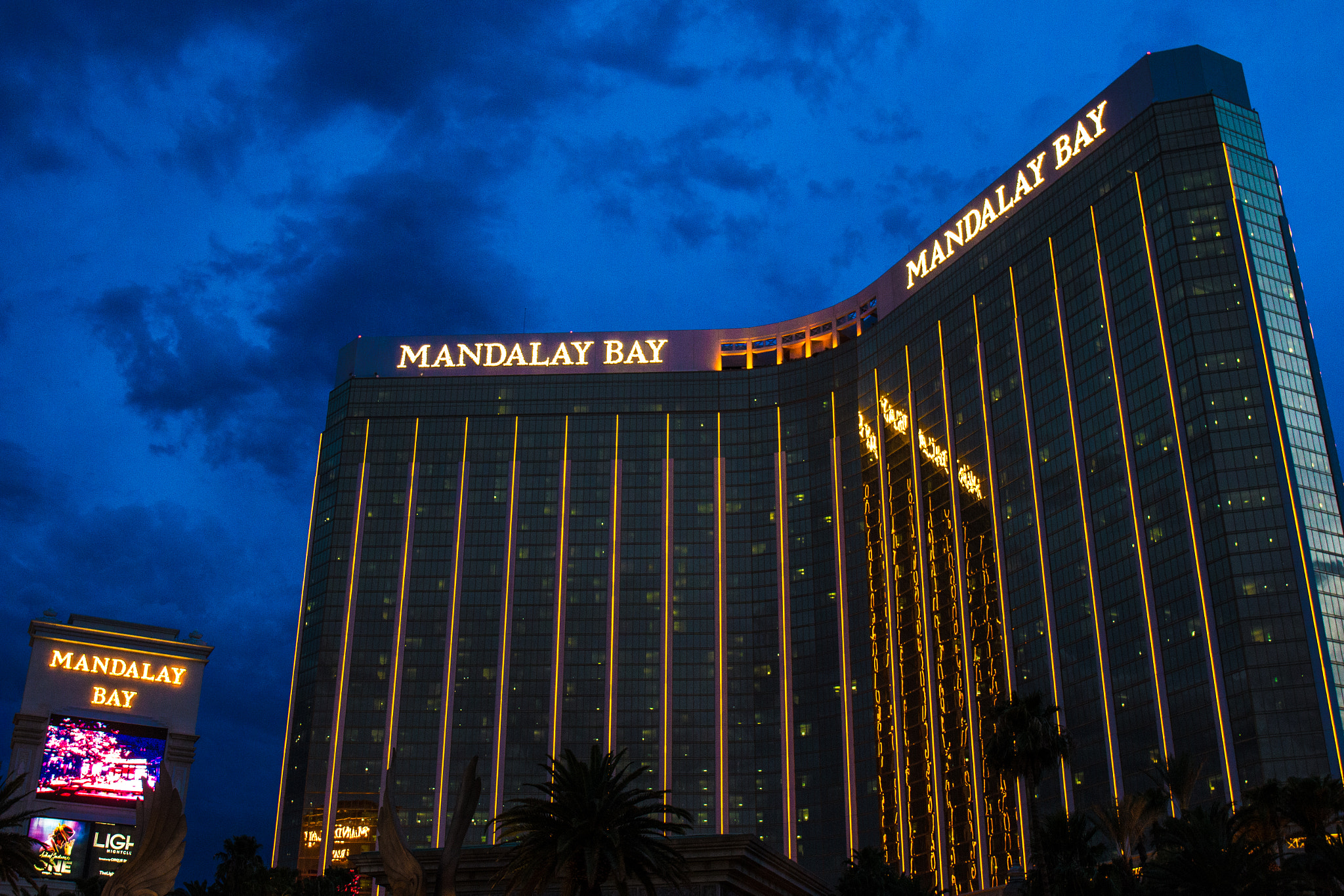
Main hotel tower at night

In addition to Mandalay Bay's primary hotel, the property also includes two others: W Las Vegas (formerly THEhotel and later, Delano) and a Four Seasons hotel. Four Seasons shares a tower with Mandalay Bay, and W is operated in a second tower.

Mandalay Bay has 3,209 rooms, excluding the other on-site hotels. The Mandalay Bay tower is built out in a Y-shaped layout. Rows of gold neon tubing run up the tower's sides, in between mirrored, gold-colored windows. Although the tower is 43 stories, the top four floors are numbered 60 through 63. Four Seasons occupies the 35th through 39th floors. The 40th through 42nd floors contain suites which are managed by Mandalay Bay. A club known as the Foundation Room operates on the top floor.

W Las Vegas originally opened in December 2003, as THEhotel at Mandalay Bay. It was renamed Delano in 2014, and became part of the W Hotels brand in 2024. Like the Mandalay Bay tower, W is also 43 stories. It has 1,117 rooms, all of them suites. It is marketed as a separate hotel.

The Mandalay Bay hotel rooms were upgraded in 2006, after MGM acquired the resort. A $100 million renovation of the rooms took place from 2015 to 2016, and further room renovations took place in 2023, ahead of the property's 25th anniversary.

==== Four Seasons ====
In June 1996, Circus Circus Enterprises announced its partnership with Four Seasons Hotels, which would manage a hotel connected to Mandalay Bay. The Four Seasons hotel opened along with the resort on March 2, 1999. It marks the first Las Vegas location for Four Seasons Hotels, a luxury hotel company which, for years, had wanted to open a property in the area. The Four Seasons was built to compete with a growing number of upscale Strip resorts such as Bellagio.

The Four Seasons includes 424 rooms, and has various amenities – including restaurants, lounges, a spa, and a health club – which are located in a two-story facility on the south side of the Mandalay Bay property. Most of the amenities at the Four Seasons are inaccessible to guests of Mandalay Bay. The hotel excludes gaming, although Mandalay Bay's casino and other amenities are open to guests of the Four Seasons.

The Four Seasons has been favorably received by guests. Since 1999, it has been a repeat winner of the AAA Five Diamond Award. It was the first hotel in the Las Vegas Valley to win the award, and in 2000, it became the first in the area to add a permanent kosher kitchen. The hotel received a $30 million renovation in 2012, and was renovated again in 2023.

=== Restaurants and clubs ===
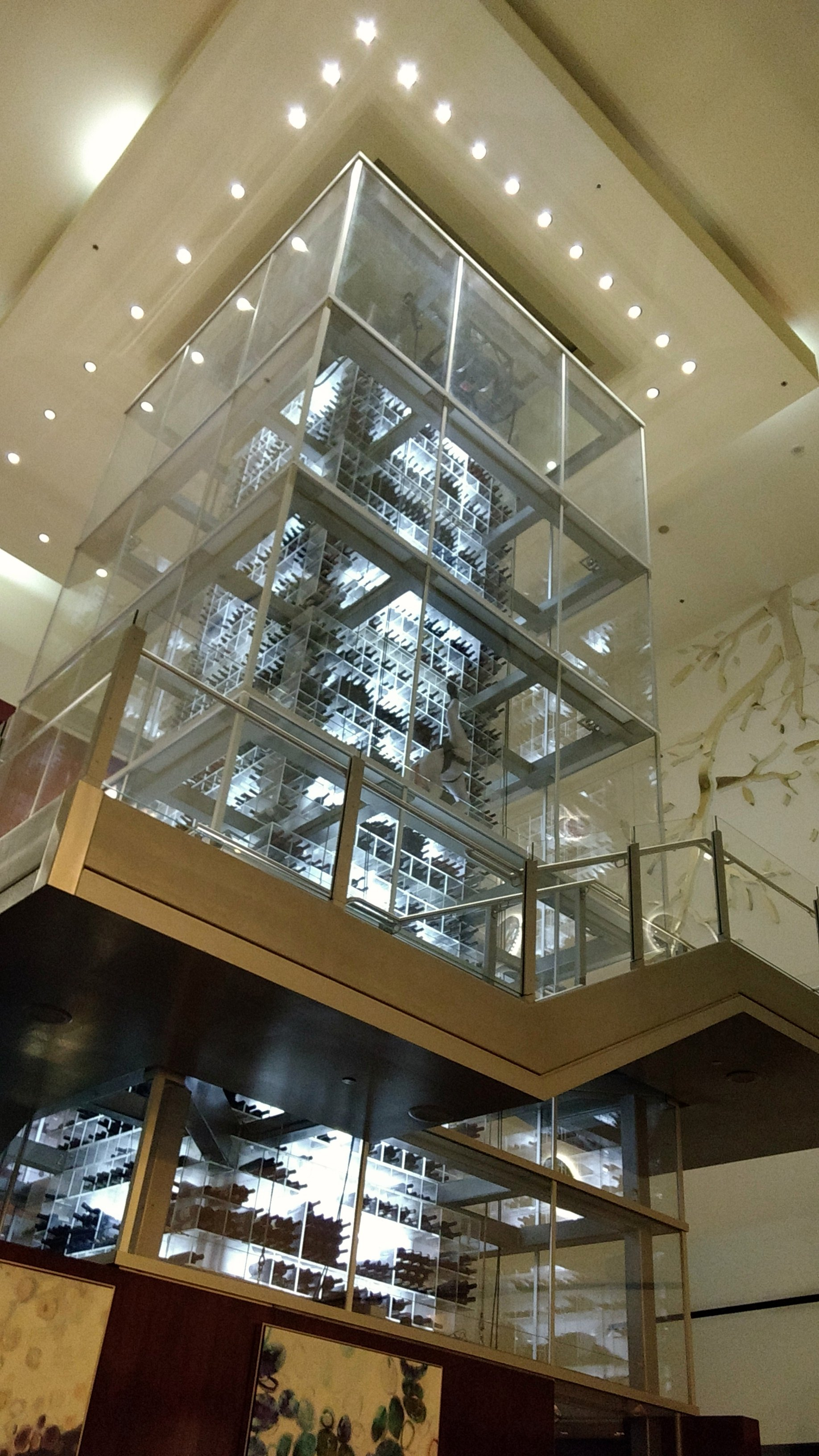
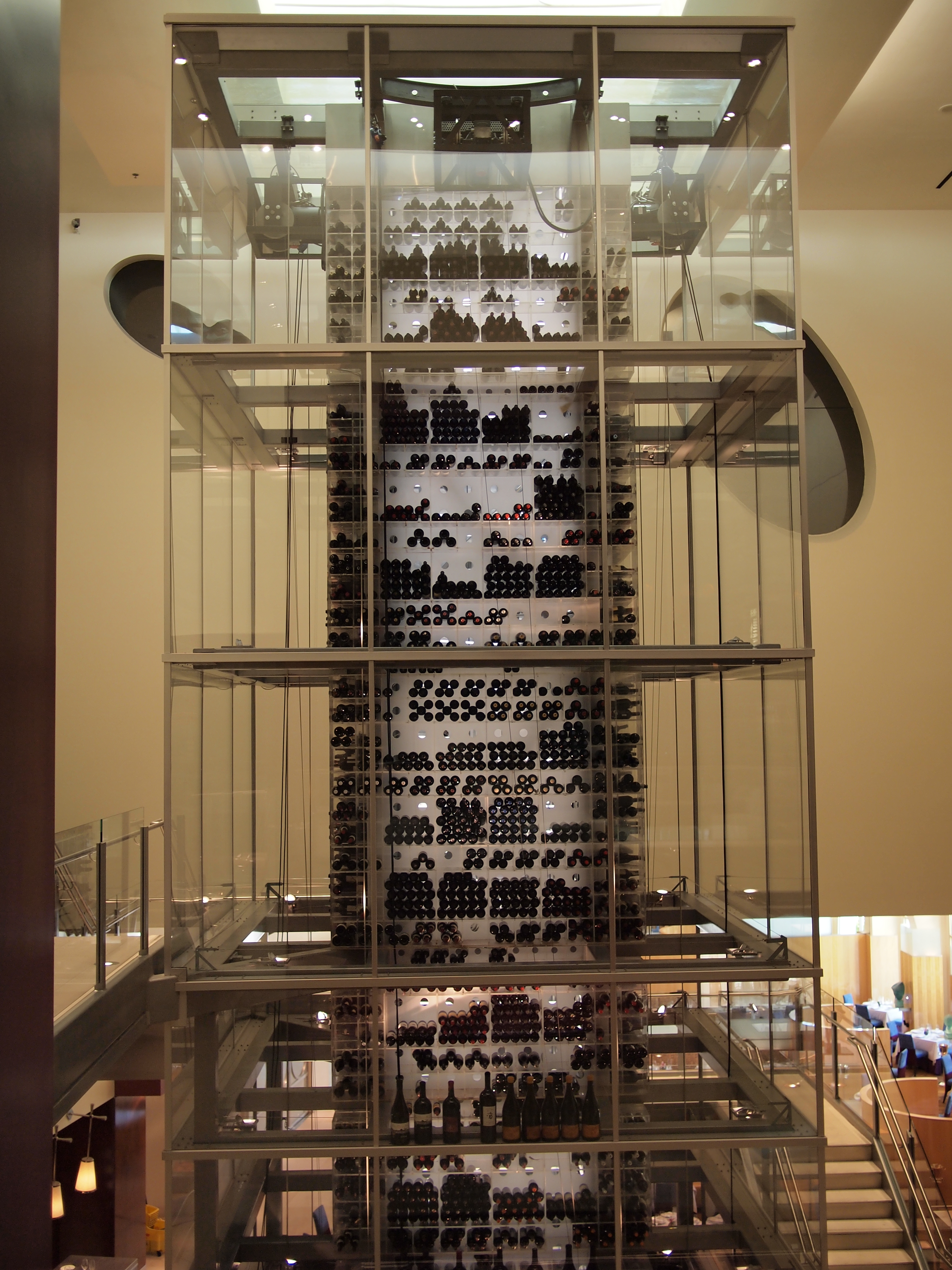
Aureole's four-story wine tower

Mandalay Bay originally had 15 restaurants, 11 of which were leased out. Most of the restaurants opened with the resort, while three others debuted later in 1999.

Among the restaurants was Aureole by chef Charlie Palmer, named after another restaurant of his in Manhattan. The Las Vegas Aureole was designed by Adam Tihany and included a four-story wine tower made of glass and steel. It could hold 10,000 wine bottles, which were retrieved by harnessed workers, referred to as wine angels. The tower is surrounded by stairs descending into the restaurant. Aureole closed in April 2023, making way for Retro, a new restaurant by sibling chefs Bryan and Michael Voltaggio. Retro features a 1980s and 1990s theme, and Aureole's wine tower was retained, serving as an exhibit space for various pop culture items.

Mandalay Bay also included Trattoria del Lupo, the first Italian restaurant by chef Wolfgang Puck. Other celebrity chefs include Mary Sue Milliken and Susan Feniger, who opened Border Grill. A Russian-themed restaurant, Red Square, featured a 16-foot headless statue of Vladimir Lenin at its entrance. It also included a walk-in vodka freezer with a bar top made of ice.

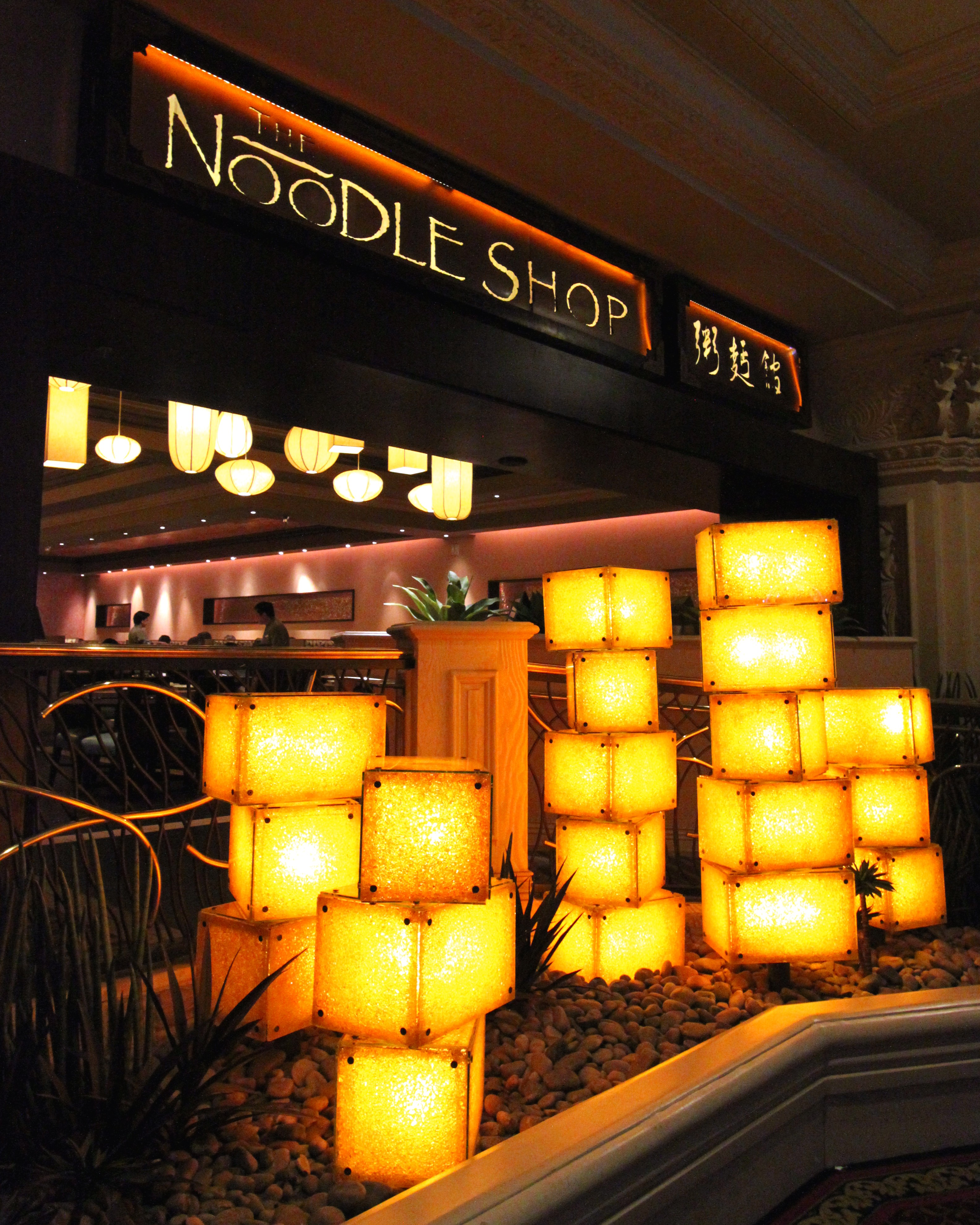
The Noodle Shop

The resort also featured several Asian restaurants, including The Noodle Shop, and Shanghai Lily. The latter was designed by Tony Chi, and eventually closed in 2011. The entrance to another restaurant, China Grill, featured a moat and working drawbridge, which could be lifted to provide privacy for reserved parties. The adjacent China Grill Cafe and Zen Sum served dim sum on a conveyor belt counter, while robot carts with camera sensors brought food to diners elsewhere in the restaurant.

By 2001, a new fine dining restaurant had opened as "3950", named after the resort's address. It served steaks and seafood, and included a lounge area with live cam footage of the Shark Reef. The restaurant was designed and managed by Mandalay Bay, unlike most of the others at the resort.

Chef Hubert Keller opened Fleur de Lys, a French restaurant, in 2004. It operated for six years, before being remodeled and renamed as simply Fleur. In 2011, the restaurant began offering a $5,000 burger, which included a bottle of Petrus wine. Chef Fleur eventually departed Mandalay Bay in 2021, and the resort took over ownership and operations of his restaurant.

As of 2006, Mandalay Bay had 23 restaurants. That year, chef Michael Mina opened his first steakhouse there, StripSteak. It also serves seafood, and includes a 70-seat bar and lounge area, serving more than 600 types of wine and more than 100 Scotch malts. Numerous restaurants were added in 2013, as part of ongoing renovations. Two decades after Mandalay Bay's opening, four of its original restaurants remained in operation, including Aureole, Lupo, and Border Grill. Red Square closed later that year, and was eventually replaced by the S Bar.

A restaurant revamp began in 2023, and included the closure of Fleur. Mina replaced it with a second restaurant in 2024; known as Orla, it serves Mediterranean cuisine. Puck closed Lupo and opened a new Italian restaurant in its place known as Caramá, which also debuted in 2024.

==== Rumjungle ====
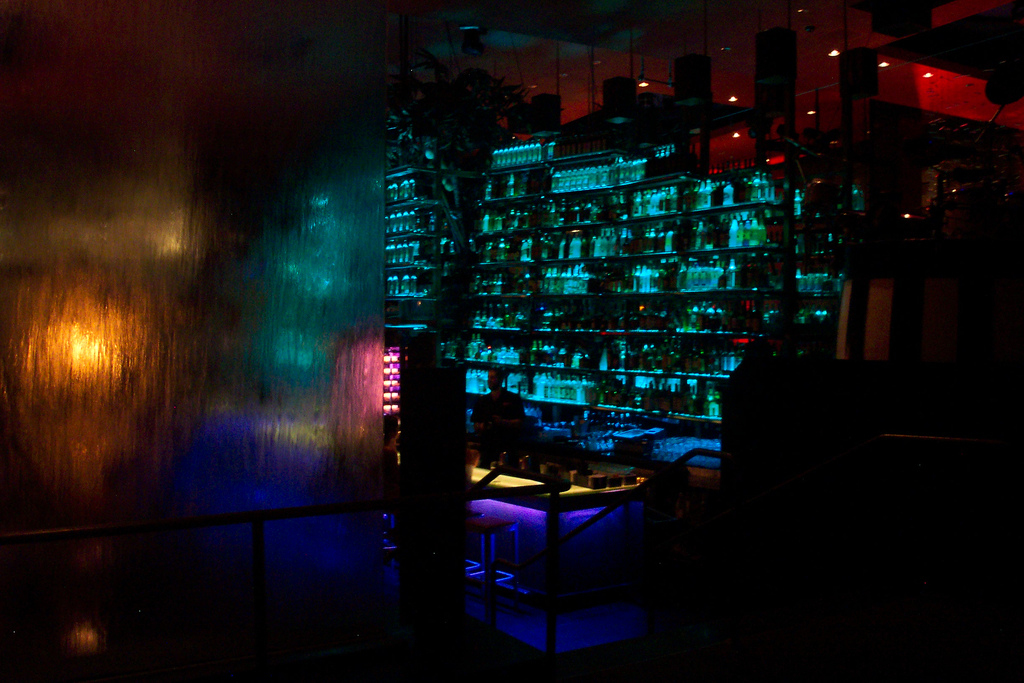
Inside the Rumjungle club

Rumjungle, a restaurant and dance club, opened with the resort. The three-story Rumjungle included the world's largest rum bar and offered more than 100 varieties of rum. Guests would enter through an opening in a wall of flames. Rumjungle, which leased its space from the resort, filed for Chapter 11 bankruptcy in March 2010, to prevent its eviction. It alleged that Mandalay Bay broke its contract agreement, which stated that Rumjungle would be the sole nightclub at the resort; in 2008, Mandalay Bay opened a lounge venue known as "eyecandy", and Rumjungle stated that its profits suffered since then. The resort countered that Rumjungle's financial problems were due to the latter's outdated facilities and the Great Recession. Mandalay Bay eventually prevailed in litigation and evicted Rumjungle in August 2010. A new nightclub, Light, opened in its in place in 2013, in partnership with The Light Group and Cirque du Soleil. It closed in 2022.

Swingers, a three-level golf and entertainment complex, opened in the former club space in 2024. The 40,000 sq ft (3,700 m^{2}) attraction includes four nine-hole golf courses, as well as bars, dining, and carnival games.

==== House of Blues ====
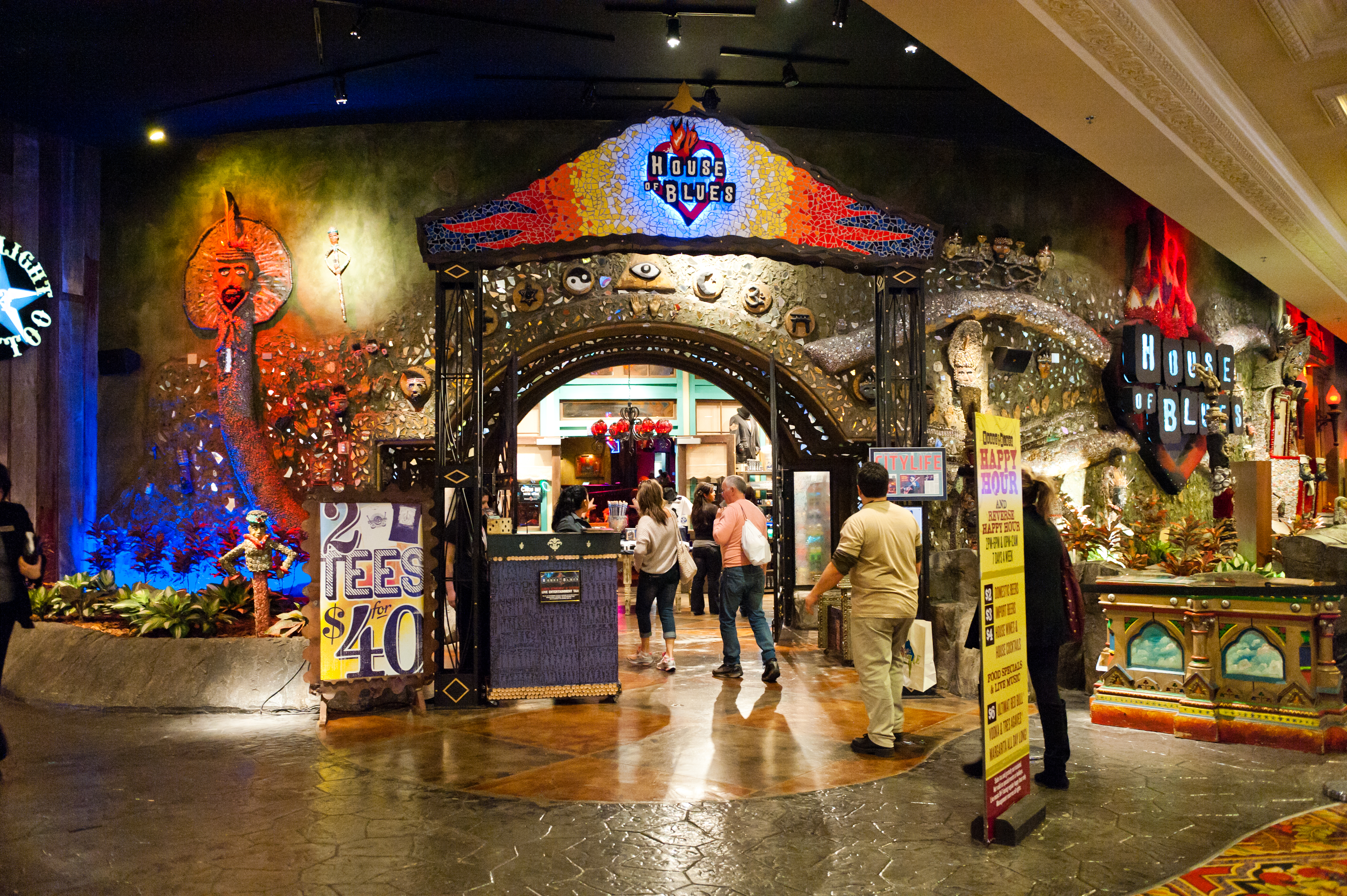
House of Blues at Mandalay Bay

Mandalay Bay opened with a House of Blues music venue and restaurant, marking the chain's seventh location. The two-story House of Blues includes capacity for 1,800 people during concerts. It also has a 1,200 sq ft (110 m^{2}) retail store. The Las Vegas House of Blues would compete against the Hard Rock Hotel, which was known for hosting rock performances at its Joint venue. House of Blues had wanted to open a Las Vegas location for years, and partnered with Mandalay Bay after discussions with the Las Vegas Hilton failed to produce an agreement. The venue has hosted numerous entertainers, including Carlos Santana, who began a residency in 2012. He has performed there for more than a decade, and extended his residency to May 2026. Two live albums were also recorded there: House of Yes: Live from House of Blues by Yes (2000), and Live in Las Vegas by Macy Gray (2005).

House of Blues also operates the Foundation Room, an upscale private bar and dining club on the hotel's top floor. It targets wealthy individuals, such as casino VIPs, corporate executives, and celebrities. Club membership is acquired through annual dues. In 2014, MGM agreed to pay a $500,000 fine after undercover police officers, during a sting operation, were provided with drugs and prostitutes at the Foundation Room by its employees. In 2020, the club removed a statue depicting Mahavira of the Jainism religion. Religious leaders had objected to the statue, calling its presence in a casino club inappropriate and disrespectful.

=== Mandalay Place ===
Mandalay Bay includes a mall known as The Shoppes at Mandalay Place. The resort had 13 retail shops upon opening, with a full shopping mall planned for property between Mandalay Bay and the Luxor. Circus Circus Enterprises and Westcor developed the mall, and Nordstrom was announced as an anchor tenant in May 1999, with the mall's opening scheduled for 2001. The project was set back when Westcor dropped out later in 1999, unable to secure a second anchor tenant. Construction stopped in 2000, after Nordstrom also backed out. In May 2002, Mandalay Resort Group announced that it would resume construction, with the mall scaled back from 1,200,000 sq ft (110,000 m^{2}) to 100,000 sq ft (9,300 m^{2}).

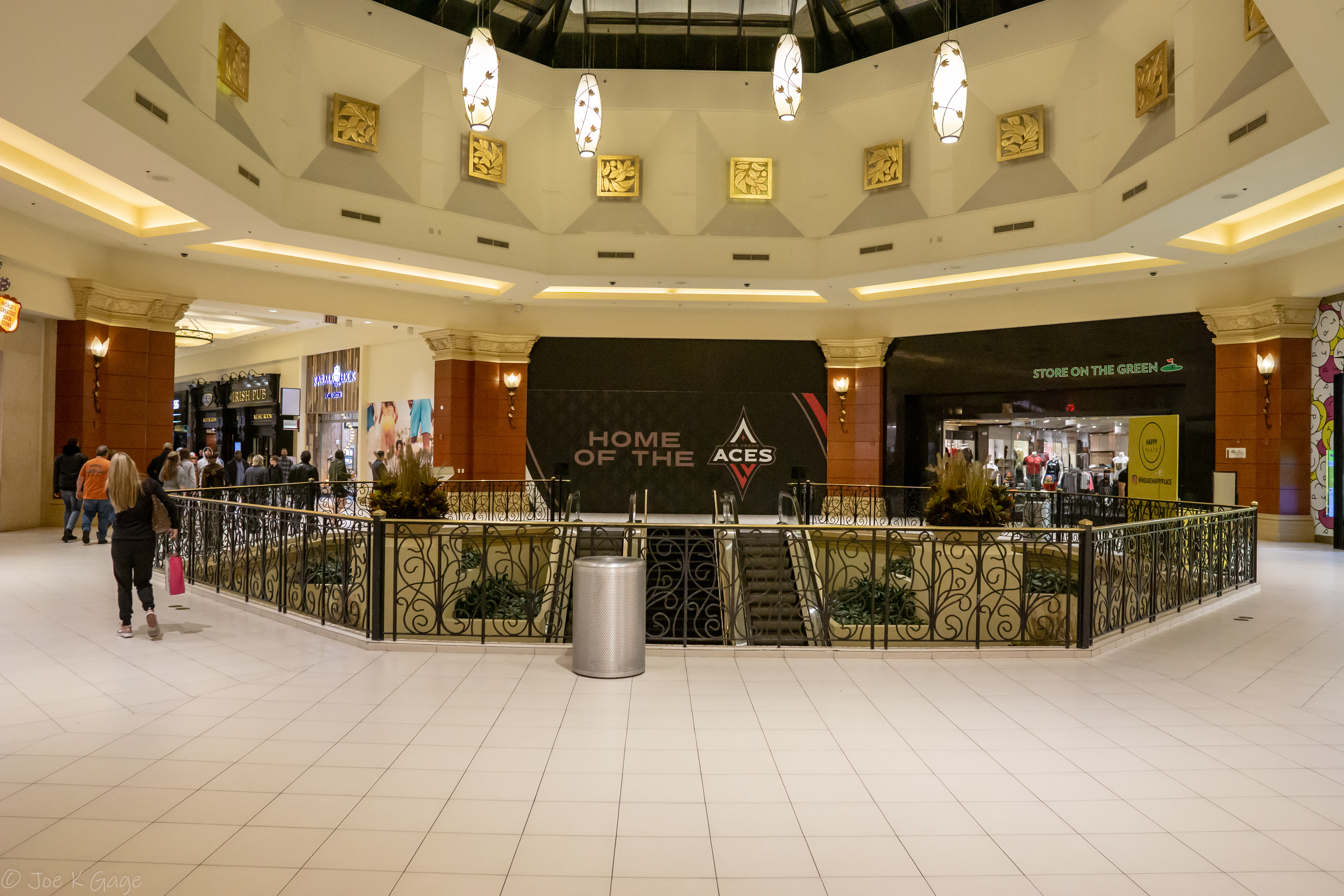
Mandalay Place in 2019

Mandalay Place opened in October 2003 with 41 retailers located along a 310-foot skybridge connecting Mandalay Bay to the Luxor. It opened with several retailers not found elsewhere in Las Vegas, in an effort to attract locals as well as tourists. Tenants have also included several restaurants, including two by chef Rick Moonen.

Among the mall's notable retailers was the Reading Room, a bookstore popular for its author signings. The store was devised by Schaeffer, although the concept of a bookstore on the Strip was met with some skepticism. Schaeffer said, "What could be a more obvious place for a bookstore than a destination that has nearly 40 million visitors a year?" It was the only bookstore on the Strip until it closed in 2009.

Ivan Kane's Forty Deuce, a speakeasy with burlesque 1940s-style dancers, operated at Mandalay Place from 2004 to 2009. The space was reoccupied in 2014 by 1923 Bourbon & Burlesque, a cigar lounge with a Prohibition-era theme whose primary attractions were performances by Holly Madison and a burlesque troupe. Madison left less than a year later over a dispute with her business partners, and it was renamed 1923 Prohibition Bar.

=== Pool area ===
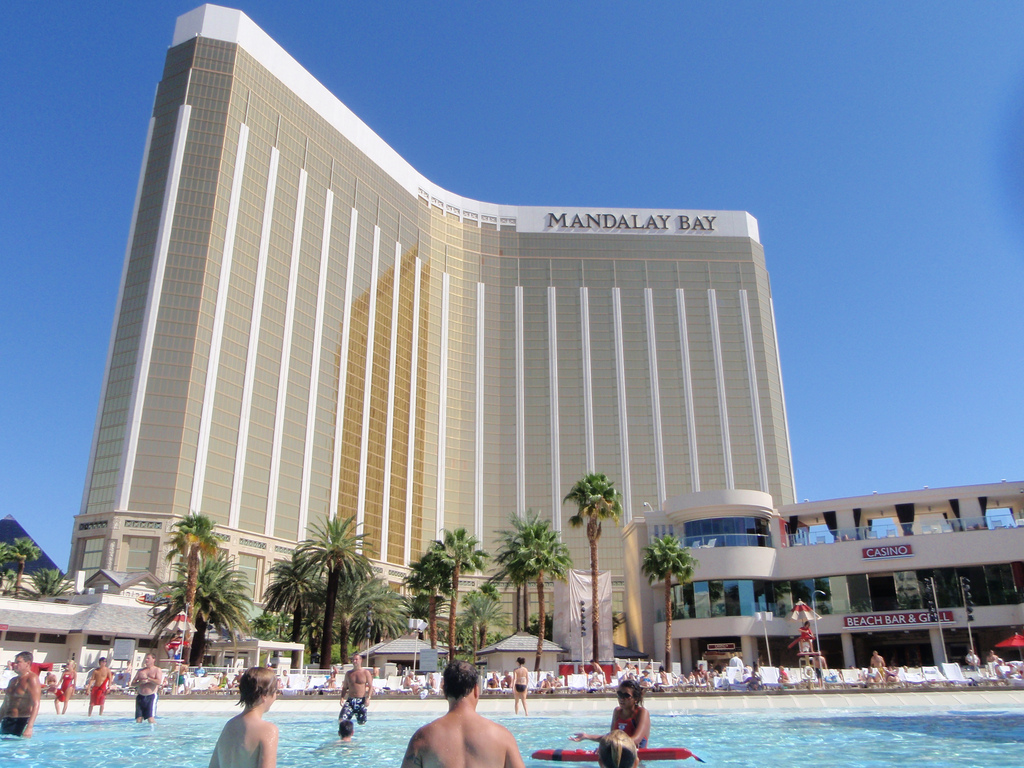
Mandalay Bay pool area

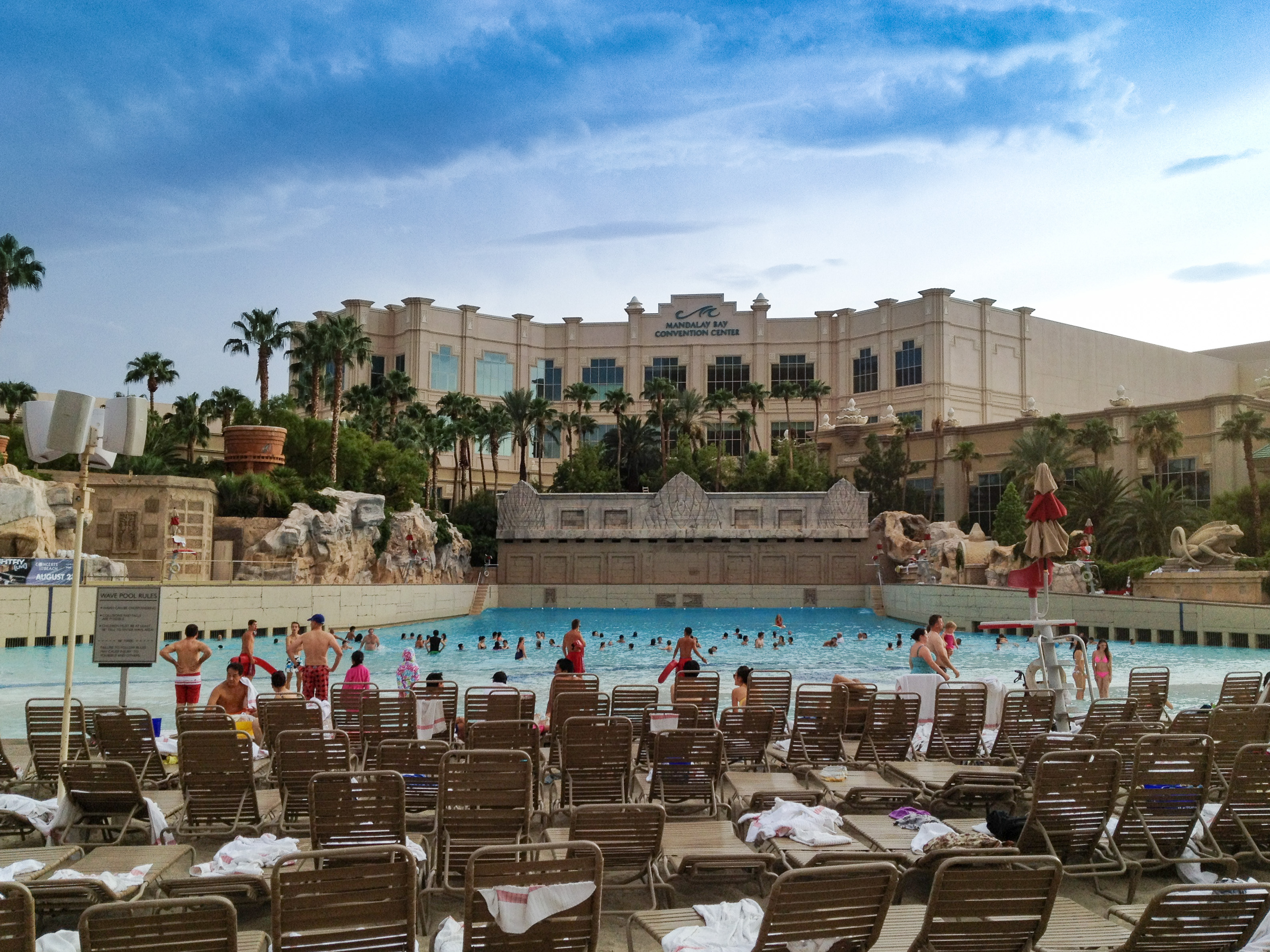
Wave pool

The resort includes an 11-acre pool area known as Mandalay Bay Beach, which features 2,700 tons of sand imported from California. One of the pools includes a wave machine producing six-foot waves. It was designed to host championship surfing. The pool area also features a lazy river, and includes a stage for summer concerts, a staple since the resort's opening. This popularized the concept of poolside concerts at Las Vegas resorts.

A topless sunbathing area known as Moorea Beach Club opened in 2003. It is named after Mo'orea, an island near Tahiti. The resort's pool area became popular among local families following the closure of the Wet 'n Wild water park in 2004. In 2013, The Light Group took over a 50,000 sq ft (4,600 m^{2}) area of the pool space and converted it into a dayclub and nightclub, known as Daylight Beach Club and Eclipse respectively.

== Shows ==
The resort includes the 1,800-seat Michael Jackson: One Theatre, originally known as the Mandalay Bay Theatre. Among Las Vegas tourists, entertainment offerings became increasingly popular during the 1990s, in addition to gambling. Circus Circus Enterprises believed that Las Vegas had evolved enough to support a full-time Broadway show. A production of the classic Broadway musical Chicago debuted at Mandalay Bay's 1999 grand opening and ran for one year. Storm, an original production show featuring Latin music, weather effects, and aerialists, ran from April 2001 to July 2002.

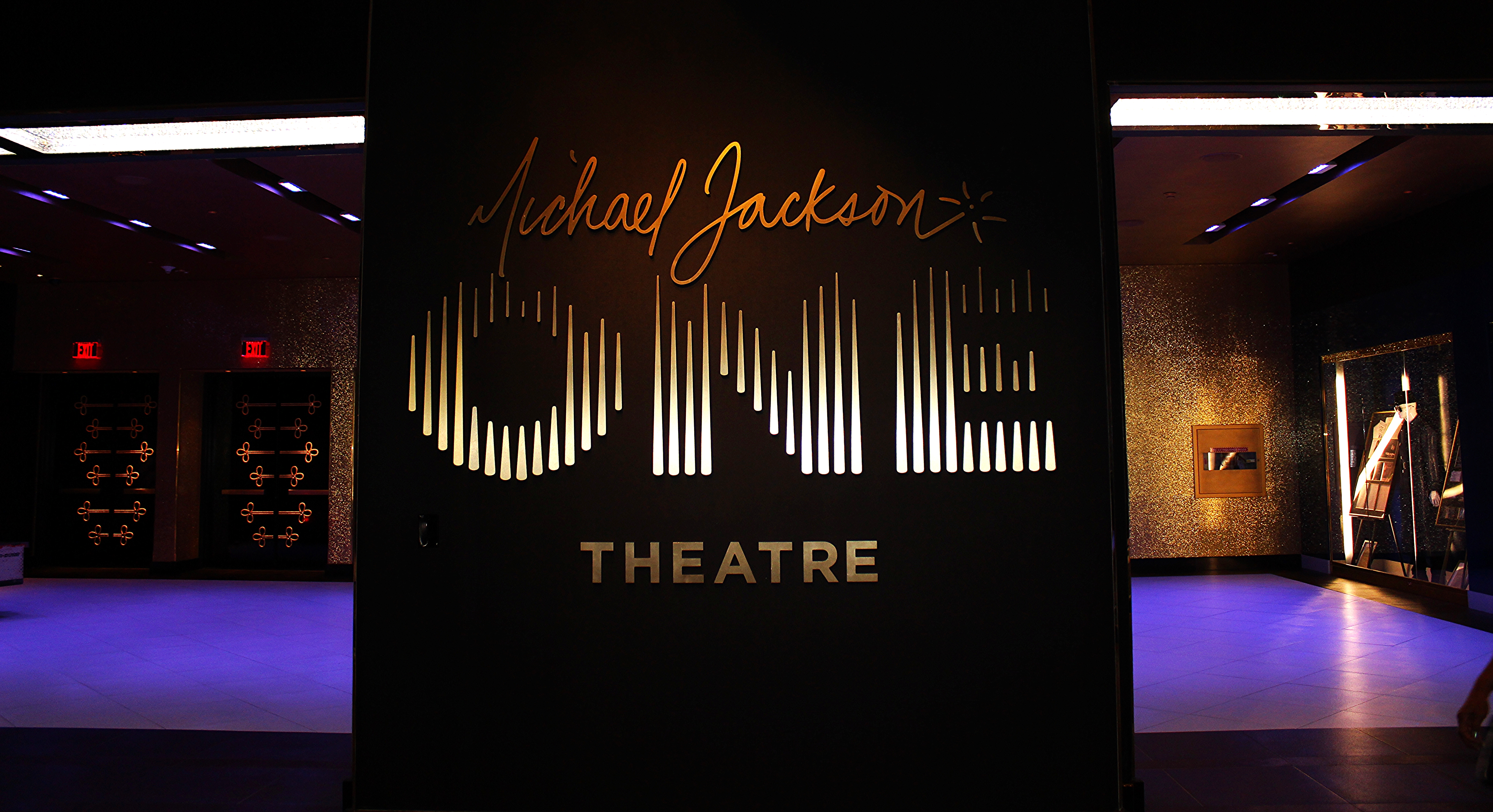
Michael Jackson: One Theatre

Both Chicago and Storm failed to achieve wide success. Schaeffer acknowledged that the resort needed "a more forceful and exciting show", prompting the addition of the Broadway musical Mamma Mia! in February 2003. It had a successful run which ended in January 2009, after approximately 2,300 performances. It was replaced by another Broadway show, Disney's The Lion King, which ran from May 2009 to December 2011.

During that time, resort executives realized that the property needed an A-list show, as many guests would travel elsewhere to see live entertainment. In response, Mandalay Bay partnered with Cirque du Soleil to create Michael Jackson: One, which eventually opened in May 2013. It is a music production show featuring numerous songs by late singer Michael Jackson.

== In popular culture ==
Mandalay Bay made its film debut in the 1999 film Play It to the Bone, which shot in several areas of the resort. The first season of Las Vegas (2003) was also filmed partially at Mandalay Bay, which stood in as the fictional Montecito resort. Filming included the casino, lobby, and wave pool. A 2014 episode of Modern Family, titled "Las Vegas", was also filmed at Mandalay Bay.

== See also ==
- List of largest hotels
- List of integrated resorts
