= Shark Reef Aquarium =

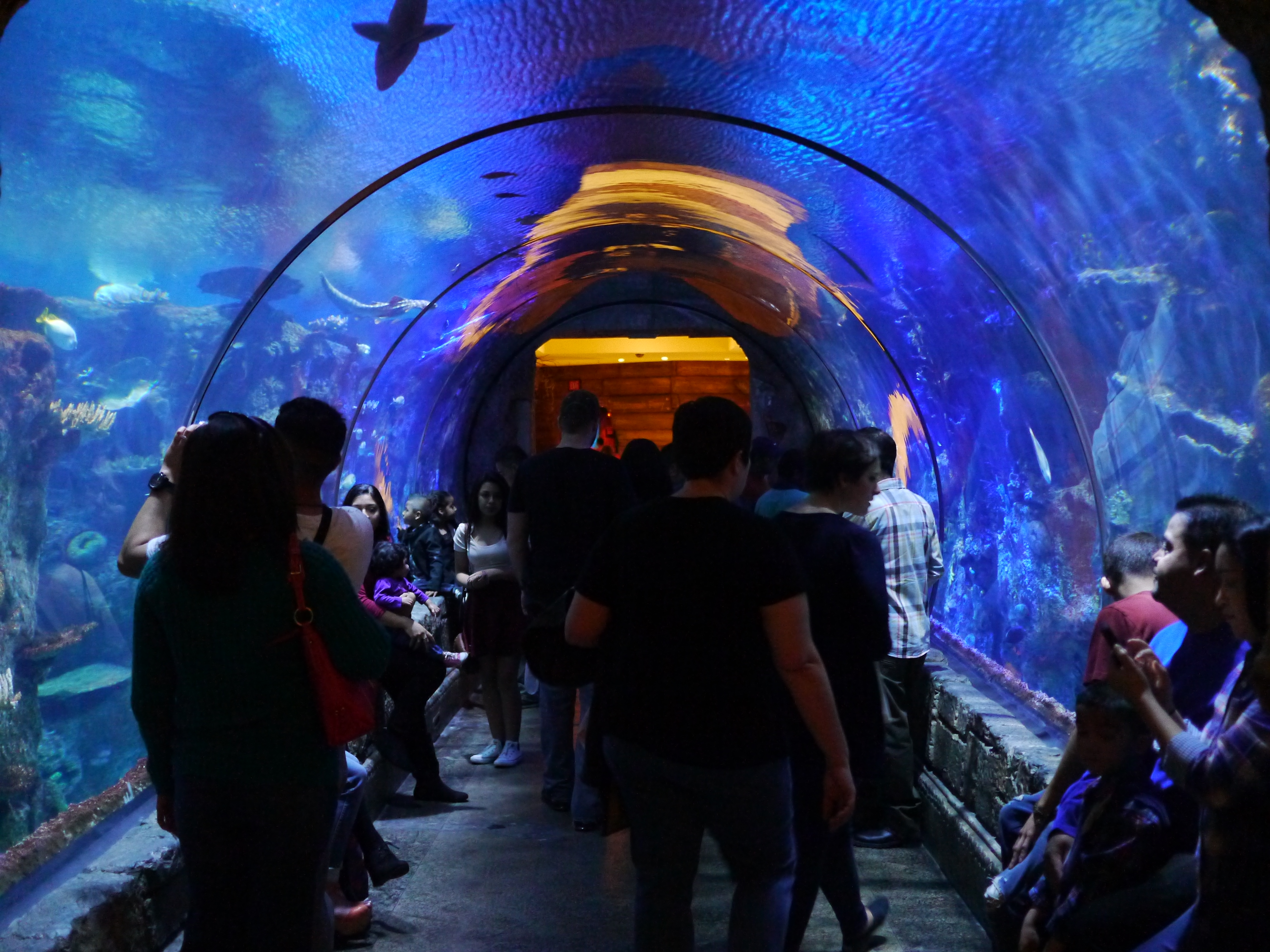
- Shark tunnel
- Interactive map of Shark Reef Aquarium
- 36.0903327°N 115.1765442°W
- Date opened: June 20, 2000
- Location: Paradise, Nevada, United States
- Floor space: 105,000 sq ft (9,800 m^{2})
- No. of animals: Over 2,000
- No. of species: Over 100
- Volume of largest tank: 1,300,000 US gal (4,900,000 L)
- Total volume of tanks: 1,600,000 US gal (6,100,000 L)
- Memberships: AZA
- Website: mandalaybay.mgmresorts.com/en/entertainment/shark-reef-aquarium.html

Shark Reef Aquarium is a public aquarium on the Las Vegas Strip in Paradise, Nevada. It is located at and owned by the Mandalay Bay resort. The attraction opened on June 20, 2000. Its main tank is 1,300,000 US gallons (4,900,000 L), one of the largest in North America. The facility is 105,000 sq ft (9,800 m^{2}), and displays numerous species of sharks, rays, fish, reptiles, and marine invertebrates. It also features a shark tunnel. The reef was developed in consultation with the Vancouver Aquarium.

== History ==
Shark Reef was developed with help from the Vancouver Aquarium. It was built at a cost of $40 million, and was opened on June 20, 2000. Shark Reef received its 1 millionth visitor in May 2001, and had generated $10 million up to that point. It was accredited by the Association of Zoos and Aquariums in 2003.

As of 2017, Shark Reef had 80 workers, including 35 aquarists. The facility receives an annual 900,000 visitors on average.

In 2020, Shark Reef announced plans for a 36-seat virtual reality theater showing aquatic short films. It opened later that year.

== Exhibits and animals ==
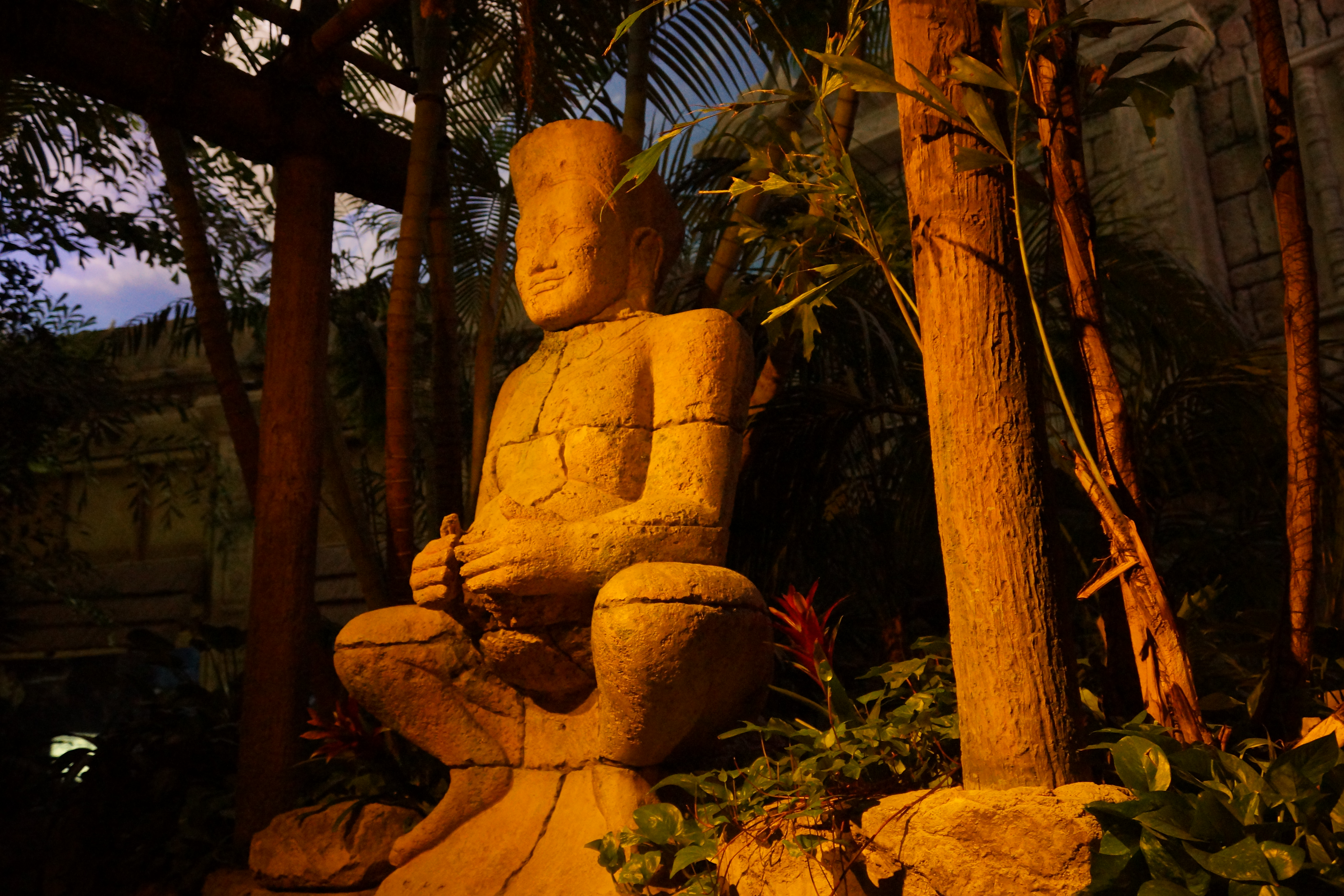
Temple statue at Shark Reef

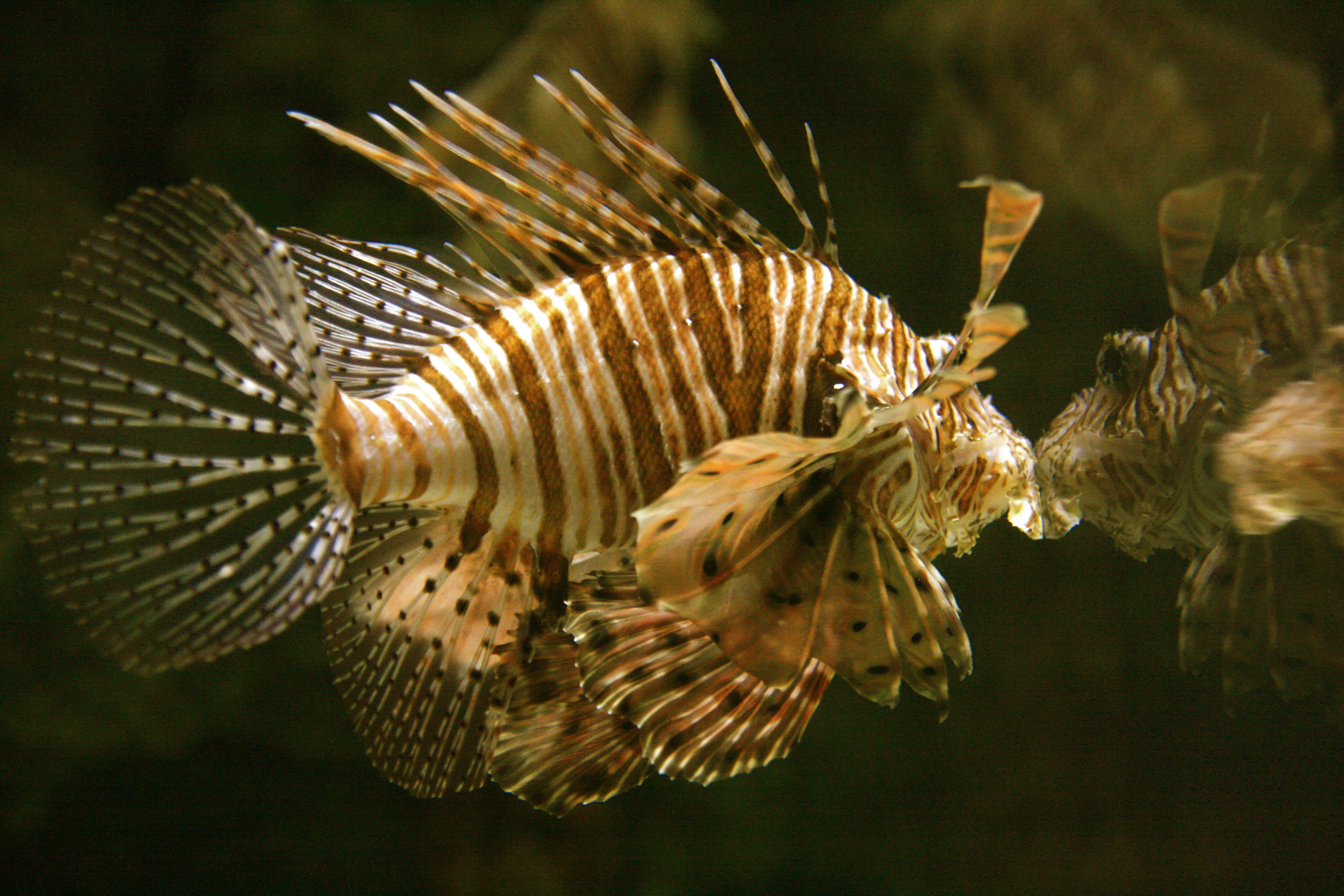
Pterois volitans in the aquarium.

The 105,000 sq ft (9,800 m^{2}) facility is designed to resemble a sinking ancient temple. It includes the largest aquarium on the Las Vegas Strip, holding 1,300,000 US gallons (4,900,000 L). Features include a shark tunnel, and a viewing area designed as the interior of a sunken ship. The 1,300,000 US gal (4,900,000 L) shipwreck tank, touted as the third largest in North America, is home to several endangered and threatened marine species including green sea turtles, Galapagos sharks, blacktip reef sharks, sand tiger sharks, and green sawfish.

Upon opening, it included the only indoor shark exhibit on the U.S. west coast, featuring 10 shark species. Other animals have included small stingrays, horseshoe crabs, moon jellyfish, and water monitors. Sharks generally do not hunt the other fish present in the aquarium, as they are kept well-fed. As of 2005, Shark Reef had more than 2,000 aquatic animals and reptiles, and one employee responsible for preparing their food. Large lights above the tank are used to indicate feeding time for the sharks. The facility spent $150,000 annually on food, equaling about 500 pounds per week. In total, the facility had 65 employees.

By 2007, the aquarium contained 15 types of sharks. In 2008, Shark Reef received a Komodo dragon from the Miami Zoo. Additional Komodos were introduced in 2013. By that time, the aquarium had also introduced a diving program, allowing guests to swim with the sharks. Guests can also feed the various animals, through a separate program introduced in 2013.

Two scalloped hammerheads were introduced in 2015, making Shark Reef one of three aquariums in the U.S. to feature the species. At the time, the aquarium contained 16 shark species representing 100 individuals. It also had 14 exhibits dedicated to the various animals. A new exhibit, introduced later in 2015, featured aquatic animals preserved through plastination.

=== Devils Hole pupfish ===
In May 2006, two adult male Devils Hole pupfish were moved to Shark Reef from Devils Hole, while two adult females were relocated from a refuge at Hoover Dam, in hopes of augmenting the population. As of July 2020, these fish can be found in a small exhibit in the first section of the aquarium. Additionally, over 200 of the fish are in a breeding program in the sister site.

=== Great hammerhead shark ===
Shark Reef Aquarium was the first closed-system aquarium in North America to exhibit a great hammerhead shark. The female juvenile was less than four feet long when she was accidentally caught off the coast of Florida. The shark was flown into Mandalay Bay in August 2001 on a 16-hour flight in a transportation tank designed specifically for it. It remained in a private quarantine tank for 2.5 years until the in-house aquarium husbandry team decided it had grown large enough where it would not fall prey to the other sharks in the exhibit tank. It measured six feet long when it was finally introduced into the 1,300,000 US gal (4,900,000 L) tank on November 3, 2003, for public exhibition. The shark died suddenly and unexpectedly on December 16, 2004. A necropsy later attributed an intestinal infection as the cause of death. She had grown to 6.5 ft (2.0 m) and weighed in at 95 lb (43 kg) at time of death.

== Conservation and sustainability ==
Members of the Shark Reef staff participate in the "Adopt-a-Cove" program to aid in the clean up of Lake Mead.
