= W Hotels =

Lifestyle luxury hotel chain owned by Marriott

- Type: Subsidiary
- Industry: Hospitality
- Founded: 1998; 28 years ago
- Headquarters: Bethesda, Maryland, U.S.
- Number of locations: 71 (2023)
- Area served: Worldwide
- Parent: Marriott International
- Website: w-hotels.marriott.com

W Hotels is an American hotel chain franchise founded by Starwood Hotels and Resorts but now owned by Marriott International operating around 70 upscale hotels and long-stay apartment facilities worldwide. Globally, the 2024 average daily rate was $321, and occupancy 67%.

== History ==
W Hotels was launched in 1998 with W New York, a conversion of the former Doral Inn hotel on Lexington Avenue, Manhattan. Barry Sternlicht, then CEO of Starwood Hotels and Resorts Hotels 1995–2005, created the brand. The concept included dark, muted colors, brushed metal, hotel staff in black T-shirts, photographs, and a bar. His demand for all-white bedding required manufacturers to develop white fabric that stayed clean without weekly dry cleaning. Many properties are co-located with luxury apartments known as "Residences at the W", such as W Boston and W Austin. About 3 in 10 W Hotels have Residences.

The earlier W Hotels in the U.S. were renovations of existing hotels within the Starwood group. Replacing the lobby with the "living room" concept, where guests could gather at the bar, differed from the traditional hotel. Although W Hotels receives credit for the idea, the underlying concept was once common. In the 1800s, the lobby provided a social gathering point in most communities. In earlier eras, the bar was often unseparated from the lobby. In 2001, Starwood added W New York - Times Square, a design model for the rapid expansion of properties in the United States over the next decade.

W Hotels opened its first hotel in Europe in Istanbul in 2008. Within the renovated Akaretler Row Houses, a group of historic structures built in the 1870s to house the employees of the Dolmabahçe Palace. Opened in 2009, W Barcelona hotel was W's first in Western Europe.

In 2012, W Hotels opened its first property in Singapore — W Singapore-Sentosa Cove on Sentosa Island — marking the brand’s 43rd hotel worldwide and its seventh in the Asia-Pacific region.

In 2016, Marriott incorporated the W chain into its own portfolio as part of its acquisition of Starwood.

In 2024, the Delano Las Vegas, located within the Mandalay Bay, and owned by MGM Resorts International & VICI Properties, became the W Las Vegas.

In December 2024, W Hotels opened W Prague at the Grand Hotel Evropa in Prague, its first hotel in the Czech Republic.

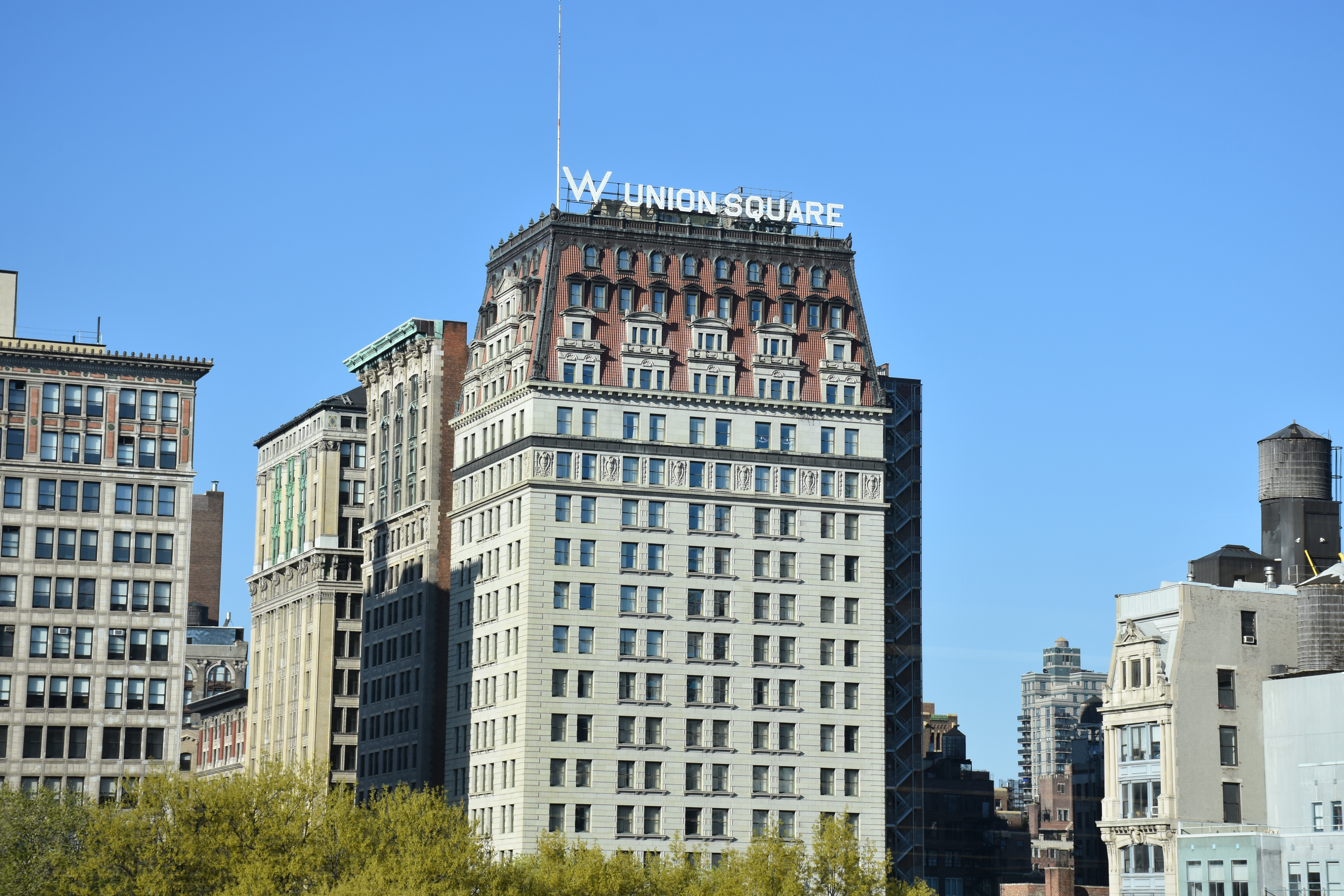
W Hotel in Union Square, Manhattan

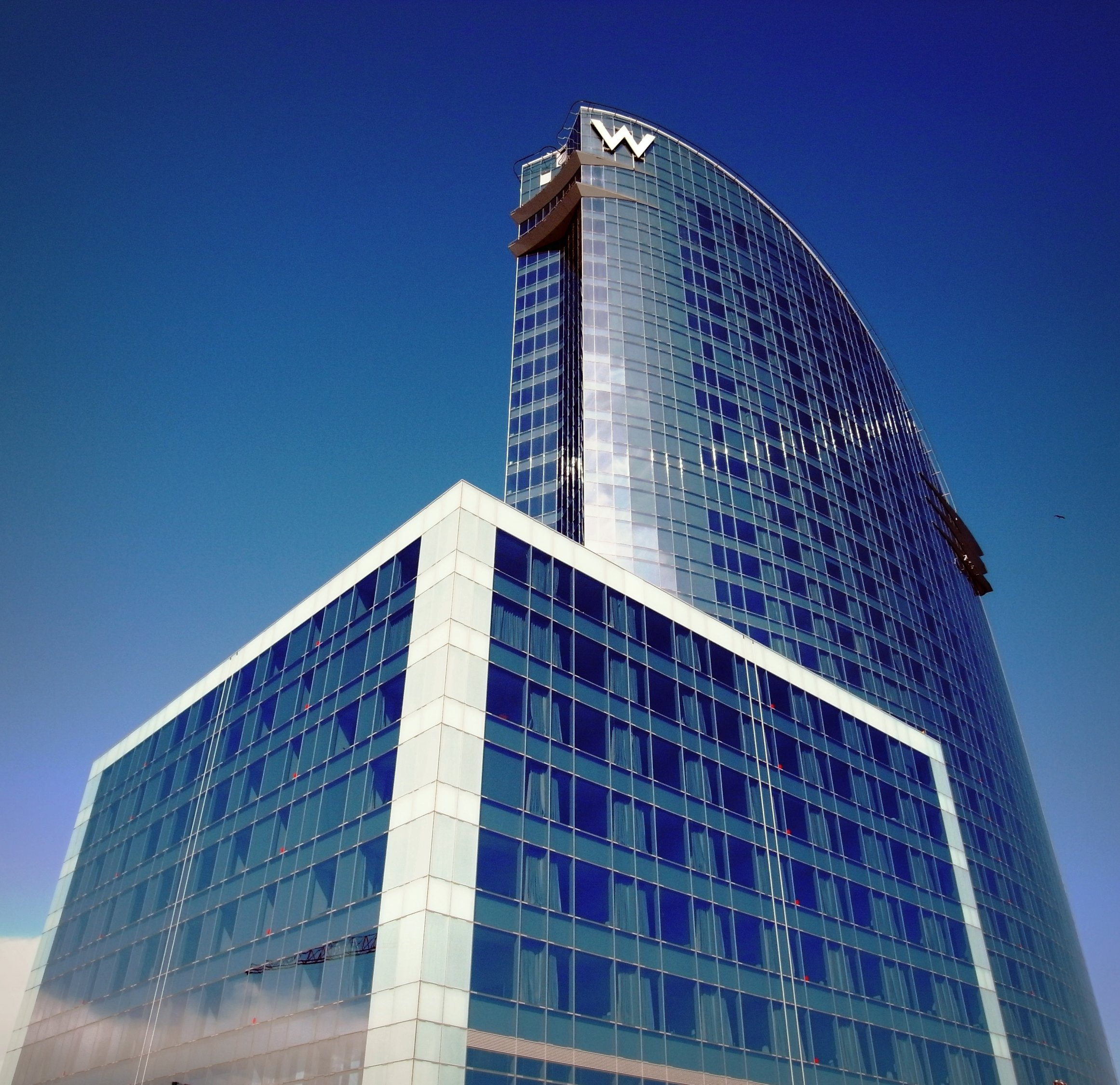
W Hotel in Barcelona

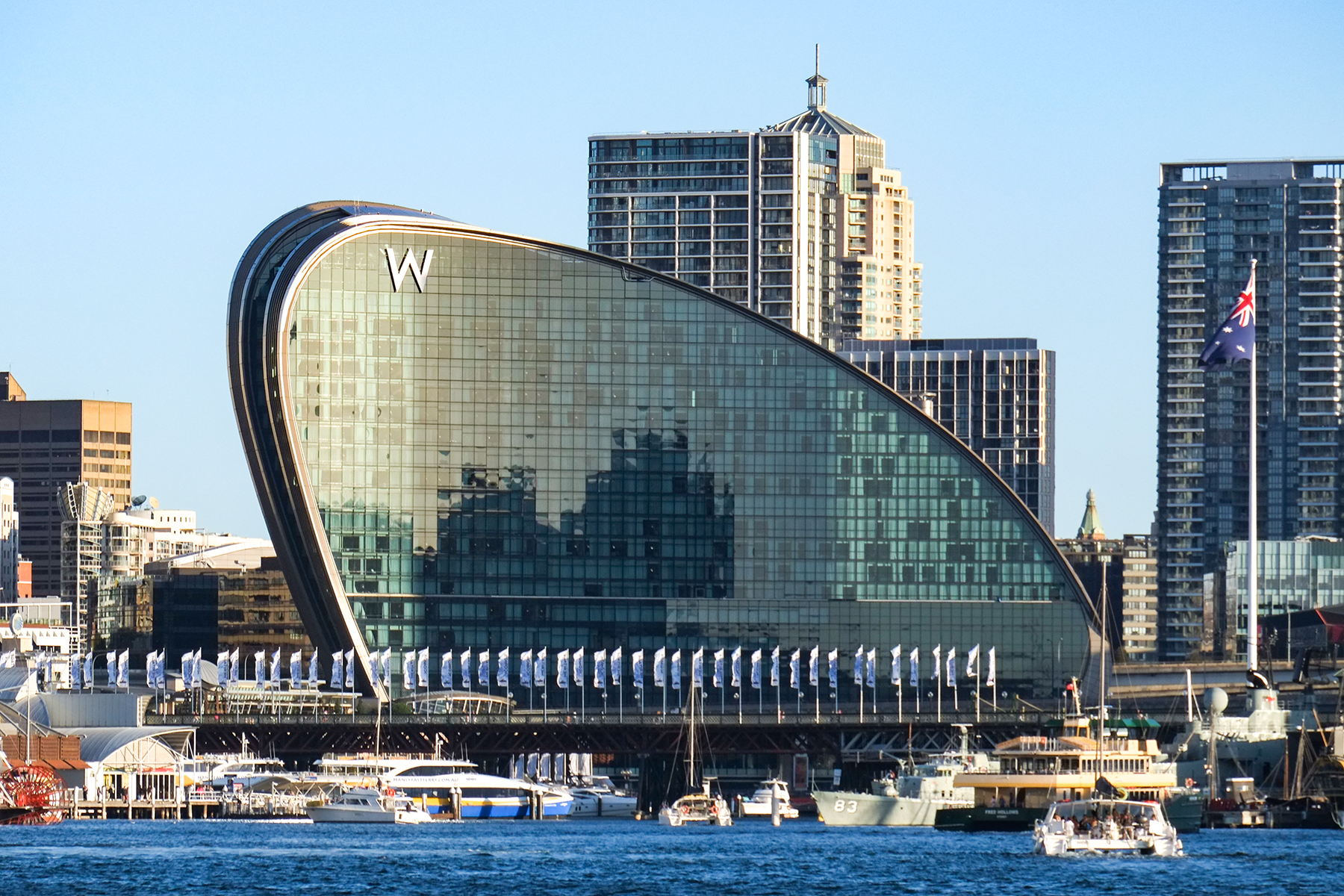
W Hotel in Sydney
