= W Boston Hotel and Residences =

W Boston Hotel & Residences
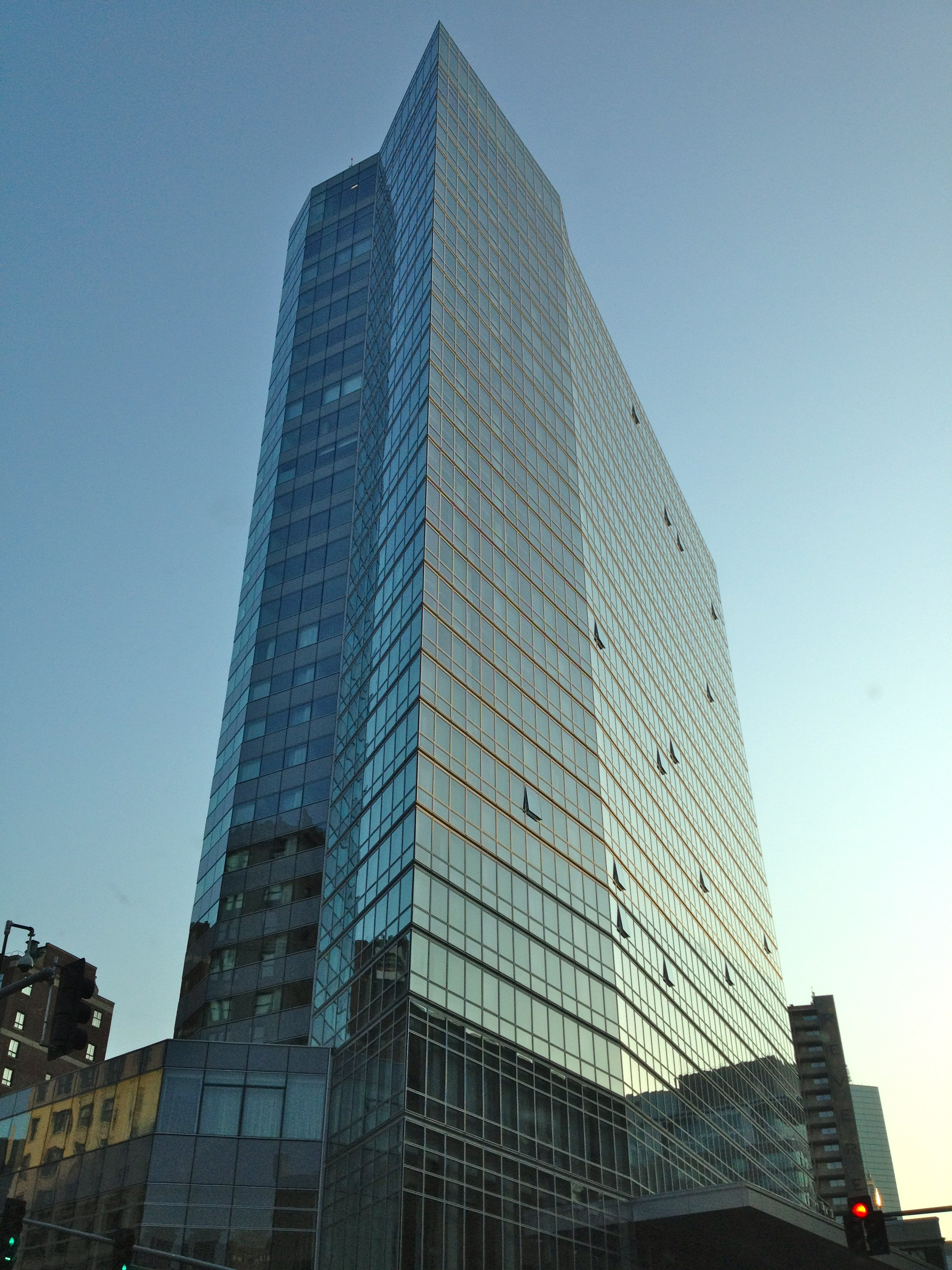
- Interactive map of the W Boston Hotel & Residences area

General information
- Status: Completed
- Type: Mixed-Use
- Location: 100 Stuart Street; Boston, Massachusetts
- Construction started: 2007
- Completed: 2009
- Opening: October 29, 2009
- Cost: $234 Million
- Owner: Pebble Brook Hotel Trust (Hotel), Sawyer Enterprises (Condo)

Height
- Roof: 84 m (276 ft)

Technical details
- Floor count: 26
- Lifts/elevators: 7

Design and construction
- Architects: William Rawn Associates, Architects Inc., TRO Jung Brannen Inc.
- Developer: Sawyer Enterprises
- Main contractor: Bovis Lend Lease

The W BOSTON Hotel and Residences is a 301-feet-tall tower (92 m) located in the Boston Theater District of Downtown/Midtown neighborhood, Boston, Massachusetts (USA). The 26-story building, completed in 2009, is a mixed-use development with hotel, condo, restaurant, spa, retail, and bar components.

W BOSTON is located across the street from the Boston Transportation Building, with the official address of 100 Stuart Street. It is managed by Marriott International as part of the W Hotel chain and was W Hotel's 35th hotel, opening in October 2009. The development comprises one restaurant, MARKET by Jean Georges (Closed), two bars, W Lounge and TUNNEL (formerly DESCENT, closed), the latter being the destination bar, a spa, BLISS, a retail store, W Hotels The Store (Closed), the 235-room hotel, on floors 3-13, and 123 branded luxury residential condominiums, on floors 14-26.

The architecture firms that designed the W BOSTON Hotel and Residences are William Rawn Associates, Architects Inc. and TRO Jung Brannen Inc. The interiors are designed by Bentel and Bentel Architects. The building is developed by Sawyer Enterprises.

== Development ==
In 2001, originally known as the Loews Project, the developer Sawyer Enterprises was set to construct the Loews Hotel on the site of the now W Boston. However, after 9/11 all projects were stalled. In 2007, the project was revived and W Hotels became the new hotel to be on site. The original plan for an all-hotel building was restructured into a mixed-use development. The fall of 2007, W Boston broke ground. The building was completed by early 2009. However, as the hotel was set to open in late summer/fall, developer lacked funding to furnish the remaining the hotel rooms, install fixtures for the residences, or complete the remaining public spaces of the hotel including the bar and restaurant spaces to the standards that people expected from the W Brand. If uncompleted, the hotel would not be allowed to open on time. As the City of Boston offered a program to revive stalled projects during the tough economic times, the W Boston project was granted an additional $10 million to finish the remaining spaces. W Boston finally opened October 29, 2009.

== Hotel ==
=== W BOSTON ===
Opened in the fall of 2009, the 235-room hotel has seven room classes including two WOW Suites and one "Extreme WOW" Suite. These suites are the hotel's specialty suites.

==== W Hotels The Store ====
The hotel's gift shop which sold clothing, jewelry, toys, etc. After being open for just two years, due to slow business as well as a chain-wide decision, the store closed September 2011.

==== MARKET By Jean Georges ====
Three Michelin Star Chef, Jean Georges Vongerichten's fine dining restaurant in W Boston. Opened in November 2009.

In December 2013, Market announced that it would close. The Last dinner service was December 21.

==== BLISS Spa ====
New York based spa, integral of the W Hotels Chain. Opened Spring/Summer 2010

==== W Lounge ====
Originally called 'The Living Room', the W Lounge is part W Boston's lobby area.

==== DESCENT ====
Underground Destination Bar/Lounge/Nightclub, Opened November 2011. Near the end of December 2012, Descent closed down for what the W Boston calls a "re-invigoration." Plans for a re-opening or a new bar took place during 2013.

==== James Joseph Salon ====
A Newbury Street salon opened October 2012 on Level 1 of where the Bliss retail space used to be.

==== The Boston Sun Glass Company ====
Opened November 2012, a sun glass retail store in the space of the original W Hotels The Store.

==== TUNNEL ====
Opened October 10, 2013, TUNNEL is a bar, located in the former DESCENT space. The owner is Brian Lesser of The Speakeasy Group who also runs Storyville, Tavern Road, Vine Brook Tavern, Alden and Harlow, Sweet Cheeks in the Boston area.

== Condo ==
=== The Residences at W Boston ===
A branded, full service condominium building comprising 123 private residences. Located on the upper floors of the building, residents have access to all components of the hotel including the hotel gym, FIT. Residents have their own private, separate entrance, lobby, and elevators. Initial prices ranged from $400s to $4.55mm.

==== 2013 HGTV Urban Oasis ====
For the location of the 2013 HGTV Urban Oasis, The Residences at the W Boston was chosen. The sweepstakes gave away a 1-bedroom, 1 ½-bath 1,000-square-foot residence located on the 24th floor of the Residences at W Boston and all-new 2014 Acura MDX, with the total prize package worth over 1 million.

== April 2010 bankruptcy ==
Due to slow sales of the condos and weak hotel economy during the fall of 2009, the developer filed for Ch 11 Bankruptcy Protection April 2010. The developer came out of the bankruptcy the summer of 2011, after winning court battle with Prudential Insurance, which sought foreclosure on the development.

== Sale of W Hotel Boston ==
The hotel component was sold in March 2011 to Pebblebrook Hotel Trust at the price of $89.5 million. The residential component is still owned by Sawyer Enterprises.

== October 2012 bankruptcy reversal ==
Early October 2012, the appeals court reversed the previous ruling of the allowance of SW Boston to exit bankruptcy.

== April 2014 bankruptcy case resolution ==
In April 2014, the U.S. First Circuit Court of Appeals remained in favor of the bankruptcy judge who blocked efforts by the Prudential Insurance Co. of America to foreclose on the remaining condominiums owned by developer SW Boston at the W Boston Hotel & Residences, ending the legal back and forth over SW's post-bankruptcy reorganization plan.

== Awards and accolades ==
- Orlando Sentinel, January 2010: W Boston- Runner Up for Development of the Year
- AAA Four Diamond Award: W Boston Hotel & Residences (2010)
- Trip Advisor: Travelers' Choice 2012 Winner- Trendiest
- Trip Advisor: Certificate of Excellence 2013
- Trip Advisor: GreenLeaders Platinum level
