= Bridgman's View Tower =

Coordinates: 39.9636°N 75.1354°W

Bridgman's View Tower was a proposed 66-story mixed use skyscraper in the Northern Liberties neighborhood of Philadelphia, Pennsylvania. Planned to rise 915 feet (279 meters), the building would've been the fifth tallest in the city.

The building, designed by Philadelphia-based architecture firm Studio Agoos Lovera, would've risen near the city's Delaware River waterfront. It was developed by Marc Stien with the support of the Ironworker's Union Local 401. The scope of the project included 794 high-end condominium units, a 200 to 300 room boutique hotel and an enclosed shopping plaza. There would've been 'green' components to the buildings, such as a rooftop garden.

If completed, Bridgman's View Tower would've been much larger than other buildings in its immediate vicinity. The Northern Liberties neighborhood is well removed physically from the core of skyscrapers that exist in Center City although the area had, by the late 2000s, become a popular locale for developers and several large scale projects are proposed in addition to Bridgman's View.

Groundbreaking was supposed to take place in late 2007, but the project never moved forward due to the 2008 financial crisis.
