= The Ritz-Carlton, Denver =

Luxury hotel in Denver

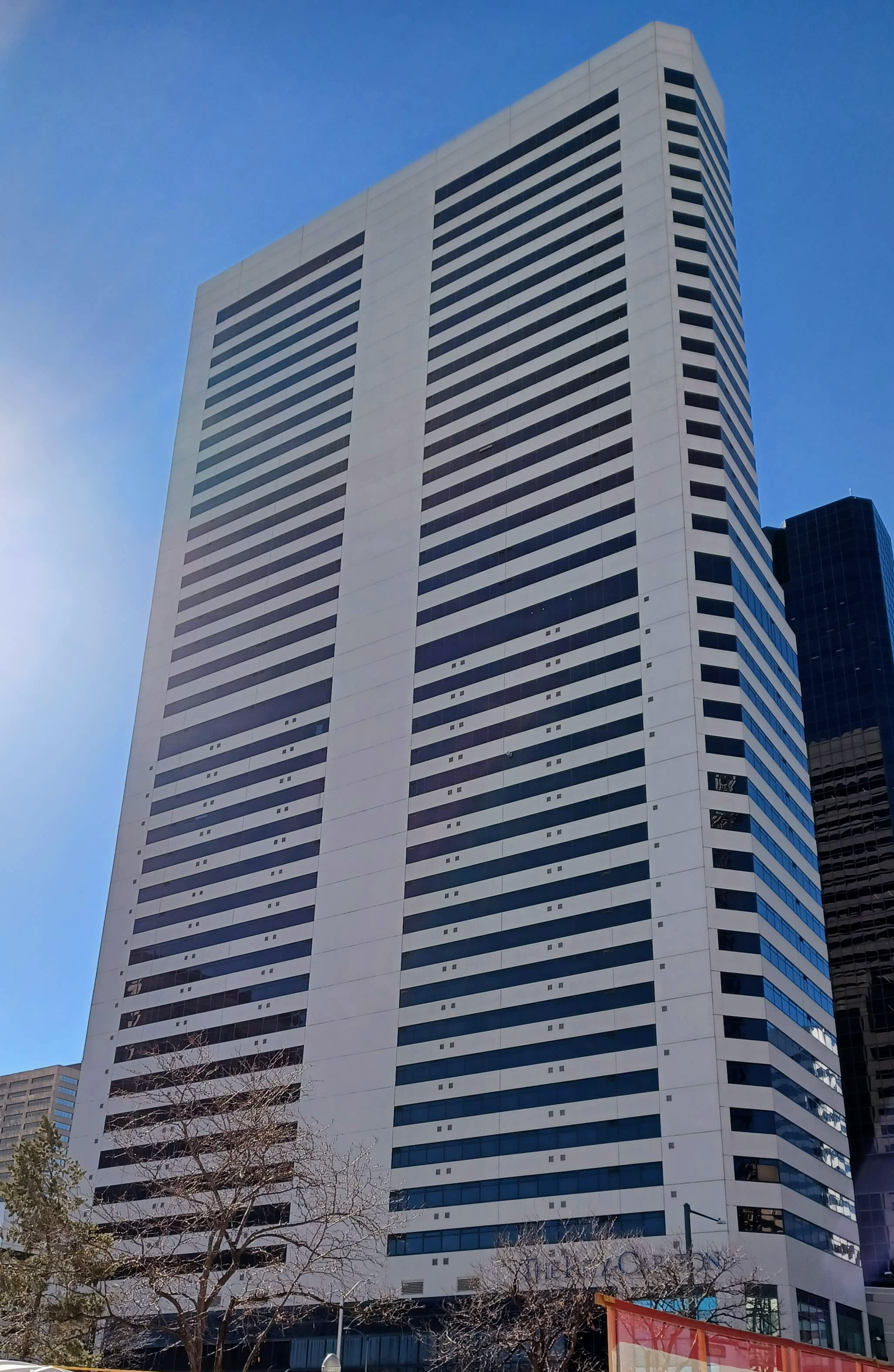
- The Ritz-Carlton in Denver, Colorado
- Interactive map of the The Ritz-Carlton, Denver area

General information
- Status: Completed
- Type: Hotel, Residential
- Location: 1881 Curtis Street, Denver, Colorado, United States
- Coordinates: 39°45′01″N 104°59′31″W
- Opening: 1983
- Owner: Plant Holdings North America, Inc.

Height
- Roof: 390 ft (120 m)

Technical details
- Floor count: 38

Design and construction
- Developer: Amerimar Enterprises, Inc., CJS Denver Holdings, LLC

The Ritz-Carlton, Denver, formerly known as the Embassy Suites Downtown, is a skyscraper in Denver, Colorado. The building, a part of the Denver Place complex, was completed in 1983, and rises 38 floors and 390 feet (119 m) in height. The building stands as the eighteenth-tallest building in Denver and Colorado.

The building was constructed as Park Suite Hotel in 1983, at which point it was the second-tallest hotel building in Denver, behind the 522-foot (159 m) MCI Building, now known as 707 17th Street; this structure is a mixed use hotel and commercial property whose lowest 20 floors are occupied by a Private Condominium (floors 15-19) and a Ritz-Carlton (Ground-14). Embassy Suites operated 337 guest rooms in the tower, including several suites. The uppermost 17 floors of the tower consist of apartments. In 2005, the building began a renovation and conversion of its lower hotel floors to a Ritz-Carlton hotel and private wholly owned condominiums (floors 15-19). This conversion was completed in early 2008, and the hotel had its grand opening ceremony on January 11, 2008. On June 20, 2020, Plant Holdings North America, Inc. purchased the property.

== See also ==
- List of tallest buildings in Denver
