= Amblyderus werneri =

Conservation status
- Critically Imperiled (NatureServe)

Scientific classification
- Kingdom: Animalia
- Phylum: Arthropoda
- Class: Insecta
- Order: Coleoptera
- Suborder: Polyphaga
- Infraorder: Cucujiformia
- Family: Anthicidae
- Genus: Amblyderus
- Species: A. werneri

Binomial name
- Amblyderus werneri Weissmann and Kondratieff, 1999

Species of beetle

Amblyderus werneri is a species of ant-like flower beetle in the family Anthicidae. It is an endemic beetle of Colorado, USA, that is only known from the Great Sand Dunes National Monument and in the nearby sand dune habitats in Alamosa and Saguache Counties. Common names for A. werneri are Werner's ant-like flower beetle and the Great Sand Dunes anthicid beetle. A. werneri is a small light yellow-brown to orange flightless beetle that inhabits dune habitats and is considered critically imperiled by NatureServe and "Under Conserved" by the Colorado Natural Heritage Program from Colorado State University. They are scavengers that feed on dead insects. They forage in debris pockets among the sand dunes and often allow the wind to blow them into these debris-filled depressions.

== Description ==
Adults of the species are from 3.0 to 3.9 mm (0.12 to 0.15 in) in length. They are yellowish brown to orange and tend to be consistent in their colouration.

The head is triangular, and almost twice as wide as it is long. The eyes are large and oval. The head is a light yellowish brown to orange colour, with the posterior section of the head sometimes darker. The integument is indistinctly tuberculate over entire disc, with the exception of the median smooth line. The antenna is almost double the length of the head.

The prothorax is only marginally wider than the base of the head. The prothorax tapers posteriorly, with the base approximately half the width of the apex. The basal portion of the prothorax is cylindrical. The pronotum disc is tuberculated, with each tubercle having a matching puncture and decumbent seta posterior to it. The anterior section of the prothorax is finely tuberculate and is covered in white to silvery erect hairs that extends towards the heads on the dorsal surface. On the prosternum, there are longer hairs that extend laterally and ventrally. Overall, the prothorax is light yellowsish brown.

The elytra is suboval, with the length of the elytra almost double the size of its width. The width of the elytra is approximately 1/3 wider than the base part of the prothorax. The sides of the elytra are slightly convex and the widest at the anterior 1/3, where it then tapers gently posteriorly to a subtruncate apex. Integument is somewhat rugose slightly rugose and covered in decumbent short pubescence. The integument is darker with the anterior corners and medially usually lighter coloured.

The legs are lighter in colour than the abdomen and elytra, and is usually pale or yellow. In males, the distal portion of the anterior tibiae are only slightly sinuate.

The abdominal integument is dark and covered with dense recumbent hairs. For most individuals, the last tergite of the abdomen only extends slightly beyond the apex of the elytra.

== Distribution ==
A. werneri thus far has only been observed in Great Sand Dunes National Monument and in the surrounding counties, Alamosa and Saguache, in similar dune habitats in Colorado, USA.

== Habitat ==
The adults are typically found in early summer in the peripheral habitats around the central dune area. They can often be found alongside Amblyderus pallens. The preferred habitat are dunes with sparse vegetation.

== Observation methods ==
Specimens have been collected at a mercury vapour lamp, but it is unknown whether the lamp attracted the beetles or the placement of the trap on the top of a dune ridge was in their preferred roosting habitat. They have also been collected via pit fall traps.

== Etymology ==
A. werneri was named after Floyd G. Werner, an entomologist that dedicated much of his efforts on the Anthicidae beetles and first discovered that this species was undescribed by science.

== Similar species ==
Amblyderus werneri is similar in appearance to A. triplehorni and A. pallens and all three species may be found at the Great Sand Dunes National Monument.

A. triplehorni is larger than A. werneri at 4.5 to 6.1 mm (0.18 to 0.24 in) in length. In addition, the head and vertex is granulated and the pronotal disc is strongly convex for A. triplehorni, while the vertex and pronotum in A. werneri is smoothly rugose and the pronotal disc is shallowly convex. For A. pallens, it has appressed setae on lateral margins of prontum and elytra, while A. werneri has setae that are 0.15–0.20 mm (0.006–0.008 in) long that are erect to suberect on the lateral margins of the pronotum and elytra.
