= Great Sand Dunes National Park and Preserve =

National park in Colorado, United States

- IUCN category V (protected landscape/seascape)
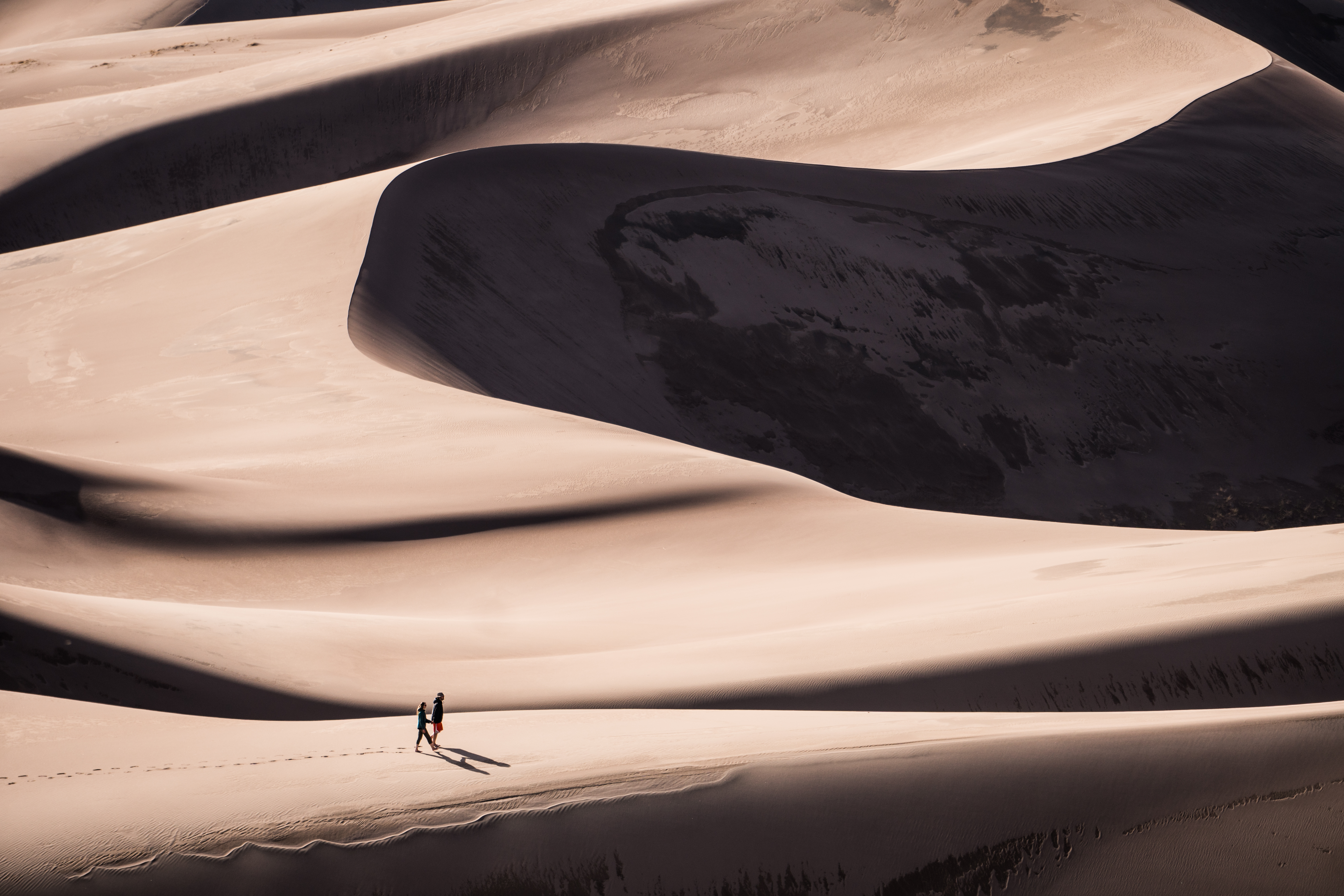
- Hikers traversing a dune at the park
- Interactive map of Great Sand Dunes National Park and Preserve
- Location: Alamosa and Saguache Counties, Colorado, United States
- Nearest city: Alamosa
- Coordinates: 37.7329°N 105.5121°W
- Area: 149,028 acres (232.9 sq mi; 603.1 km^{2})
- Established: March 17, 1932 (as a national monument); September 24, 2004 (as a national park)
- Visitors: 432,498 (in 2025)
- Governing body: National Park Service
- Website: nps.gov/grsa

Great Sand Dunes National Park and Preserve is a national park of the United States that conserves an area of large sand dunes on the eastern edge of the San Luis Valley, and an adjacent national preserve in the Sangre de Cristo Range, in south-central Colorado. The park was originally designated Great Sand Dunes National Monument on March 17, 1932, by President Herbert Hoover. The original boundaries protected an area of 35,528 acres (55.5 sq mi; 143.8 km^{2}). A boundary change and redesignation as a national park and preserve was authorized on November 22, 2000, and then established on September 24, 2004. The park encompasses 107,342 acres (167.7 sq mi; 434.4 km^{2}) while the preserve protects an additional 41,686 acres (65.1 sq mi; 168.7 km^{2}) for a total of 149,028 acres (232.9 sq mi; 603.1 km^{2}). The recreational visitor total was 527,546 in 2019.

The park contains the tallest sand dunes in North America, up to 750 feet (230 m) tall. The dunes cover an area of about 30 sq mi (78 km^{2}) and are estimated to contain over 1.2 cubic miles (5 billion cubic metres) of sand. Sediments from the surrounding mountains filled the valley over geologic time periods. After lakes within the valley receded, exposed sand was blown by the predominant southwest winds toward the Sangre de Cristos, eventually forming the dune field over an estimated tens of thousands of years. The four primary components of the Great Sand Dunes system are the mountain watershed, the dune field, the sand sheet, and the sabkha. Ecosystems within the mountain watershed include alpine tundra, subalpine forests, montane woodlands, and riparian zones.

Evidence of human habitation in the San Luis Valley dates back about 11,000 years. The first historic peoples to inhabit the area were the Southern Ute Tribe; Apaches and Navajo also have cultural connections in the area. In the late 17th century, Diego de Vargas, a Spanish governor of Santa Fe de Nuevo México, became the first European on record to enter the San Luis Valley. Juan Bautista de Anza, Zebulon Pike, John C. Frémont, and John Gunnison all traveled through and explored parts of the region in the 18th and 19th centuries. The explorers were soon followed by settlers who ranched, farmed, and mined in the valley starting in the late 19th century. The park was first established as a national monument in 1932 to protect it from gold mining and the potential of a concrete manufacturing business.

Visitors must walk across the wide and shallow Medano Creek to reach the dunes in spring and summer. The creek typically has a peak flow from late May to early June. From July to April, it is usually no more than a few inches deep, if there is any water at all. Hiking is permitted throughout the dunes with the warning that the sand surface temperature may reach 150 °F (66 °C) in summer. Sandboarding and sandsledding are popular activities, both done on specially designed equipment that can be rented just outside the park entrance or in Alamosa. Visitors with street-legal four-wheel drive vehicles may continue past the end of the park's main road to Medano Pass on 22 miles (35 km) of unpaved road, crossing the stream bed of Medano Creek nine times and traversing 4 miles (6.4 km) of deep sand. Hunting is permitted in the preserve in the autumn, but prohibited within national park boundaries at all times. The preserve encompasses nearly all of the mountainous areas north and east of the dune field, up to the ridgeline of the Sangre de Cristos.

== History ==
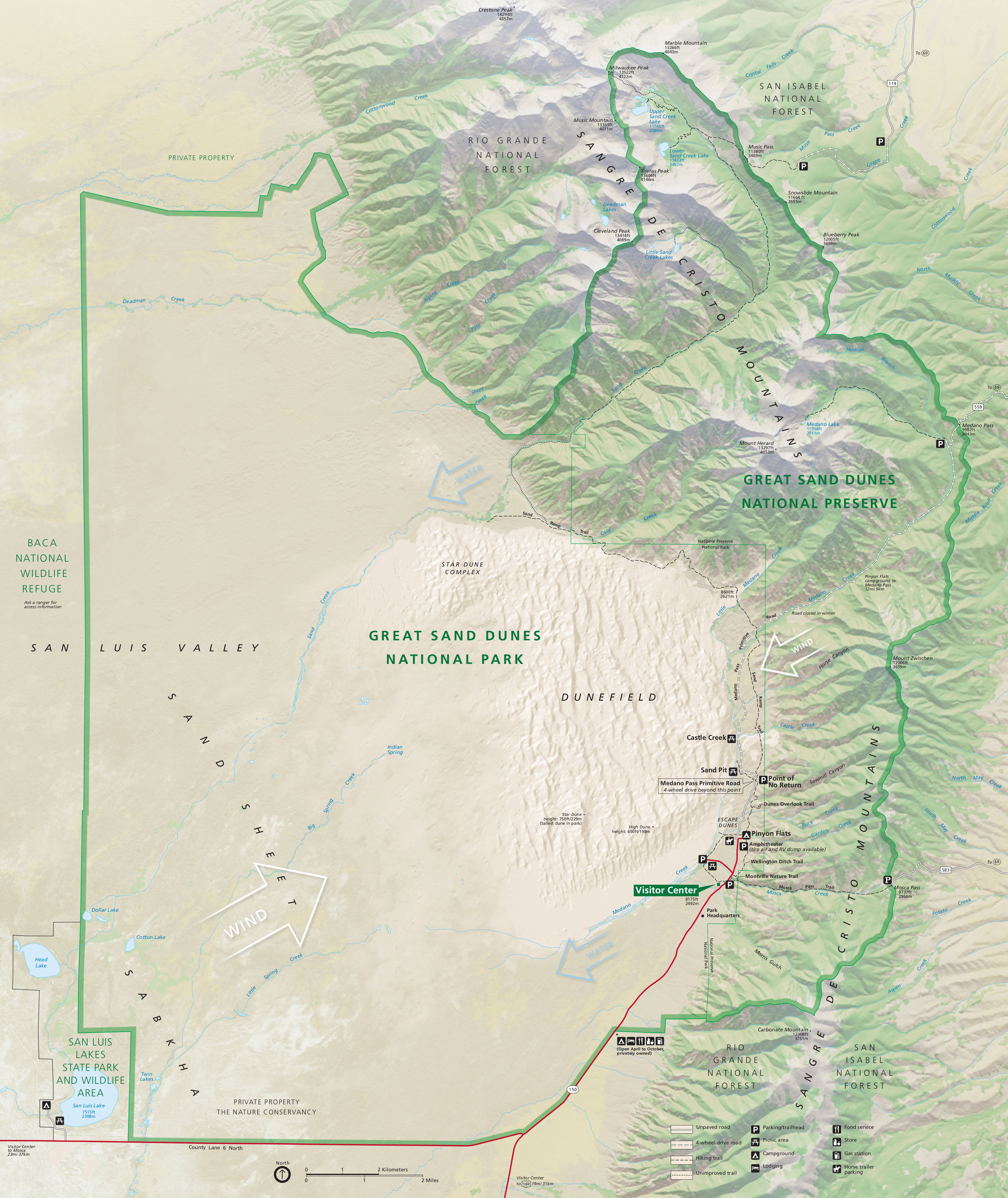
Park map

=== Native people ===
The oldest evidence of humans in the area dates back about 11,000 years. Some of the first people to enter the San Luis Valley and the Great Sand Dunes area were nomadic hunter-gatherers whose connection to the area centered around the herds of mammoths and prehistoric bison. They were Stone Age people who hunted with large stone spears or dart points now identified as Clovis and Folsom points. These people only stayed when hunting and plant gathering was good, and avoided the region during times of drought and scarcity.

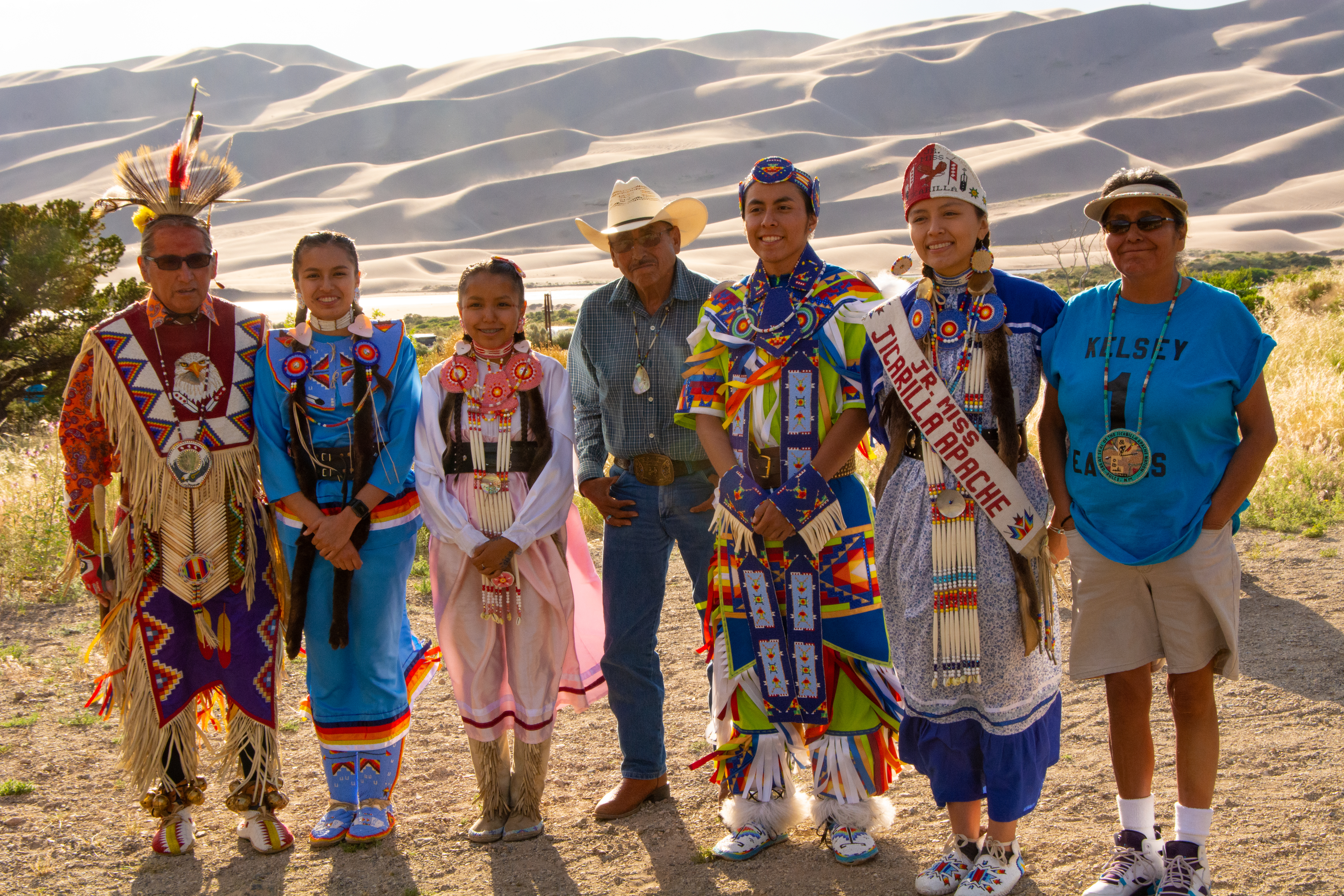
Members of the Jicarilla Apache tribe gather at the Great Sand Dunes to share traditional clothing, crafts, stories, and dances in July of 2019.

Modern American Indian tribes were familiar with the area when Spaniards first arrived in the 17th century. The traditional Ute phrase for the Great Sand Dunes is Saa waap maa nache (sand that moves). Jicarilla Apaches settled in northern New Mexico and called the dunes Sei-anyedi (it goes up and down). Blanca Peak, just southeast of the dunes, is one of the four sacred mountains of the Navajo, who call it Sisnaajini (White Shell Mountain). These various tribes collected the inner layers of bark from ponderosa pine trees for use as food and medicine. The people from the Tewa/Tiwa-speaking pueblos along the Rio Grande remember a traditional site of great importance located in the valley near the dunes: the lake through which their people emerged into the present world. They call the lake Sip’opheh (Northern Tiwa: Cip’ophúntha, also Tewa: Okhа̨ngep’oekwingeh, transl. Sandy Place Lake), which is thought to be the springs or lakes immediately west of the dune field.

=== Settler exploration ===
In 1694, Don Diego de Vargas became the first European known to have entered the San Luis Valley, although herders and hunters from the Spanish colonies in present-day northern New Mexico probably entered the valley as early as 1598. De Vargas and his men hunted a herd of 500 bison in the southern part of the valley before returning to Santa Fe. In 1776, Juan Bautista de Anza and an entourage of men and livestock probably passed near the dunes as they returned from a punitive raid against a group of Comanches. At this time, the valley was a travel route between the High Plains and Santa Fe for Comanches, Utes, and Spanish soldiers. The dunes were likely a visible landmark for travelers along the trail.

The first known writings about Great Sand Dunes appear in Zebulon Pike's journals of 1807. As Lewis and Clark's expedition was returning east, U.S. Army Lt. Pike was commissioned to explore as far west as the Arkansas and Red Rivers. By the end of November 1806, Pike and his men had reached the site of today's Pueblo, Colorado. Still pushing southwest, and confused about the location of the Arkansas River, Pike crossed the Sangre de Cristos just above the Great Sand Dunes.

After marching some miles, we discovered ... at the foot of the White Mountains [today's Sangre de Cristos] which we were then descending, sandy hills ... When we encamped, I ascended one of the largest hills of sand, and with my glass could discover a large river [the Rio Grande] ... The sand hills extended up and down the foot of the White Mountains about 15 miles [24 km] and appeared to be about 5 miles [8 km] in width. Their appearance was exactly that of the sea in a storm, except as to color, not the least sign of vegetation existing thereon.

— Zebulon Pike, January 28th, 1807

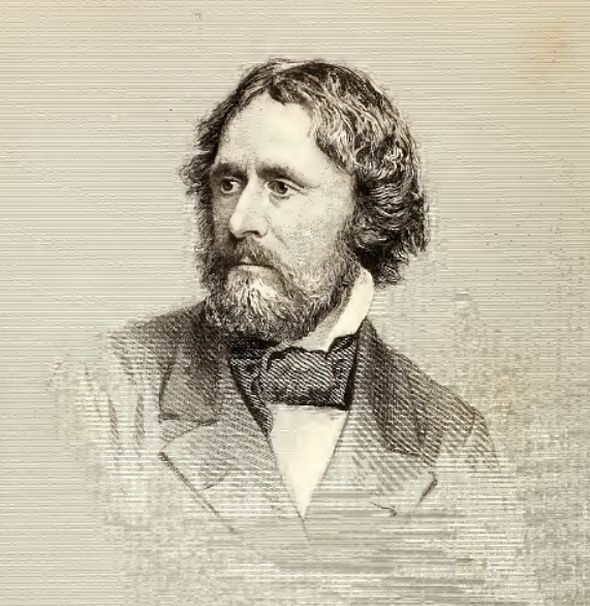
John C. Frémont

In 1848, John C. Frémont was hired to find a railroad route from St. Louis to California. He crossed the Sangre de Cristos into the San Luis Valley in winter, courting disaster but proving that a winter crossing of this range was possible. He was followed in 1853 by Captain John Gunnison of the Corps of Topographical Engineers. Gunnison's party crossed the dune field on horseback.

=== 19th & 20th century settlement ===
In the years that followed, the Rockies were gradually explored, treaties were signed and broken with resident tribes, and people with widely differing goals entered the San Luis Valley from the United States and Mexico. In 1852, Fort Massachusetts was built and then relocated to Fort Garland, about 20 mi (32 km) southeast of the Great Sand Dunes, to safeguard travel for settlers following the explorers into the valley. Although many settlers arrived via the trails from Santa Fe or La Veta Pass, several routes over the Sangre de Cristos into the valley were well-known to American Indians and increasingly used by settlers in the late 1800s. Medano Pass, also known as Sand Hill Pass, and Mosca Pass, also called Robidoux's Pass, offered more direct routes from the growing front range cities and dropped into the valley just east of the Great Sand Dunes. Trails were improved into wagon routes and eventually into rough roads. The Mosca Pass Toll Road was developed in the 1870s and stages and the mail route used it regularly until about 1911, when the western portion was damaged in a flash flood. Partially rebuilt at times in the 1930s through the 1950s, the road was repeatedly closed due to flood damage and is now a hiking trail.

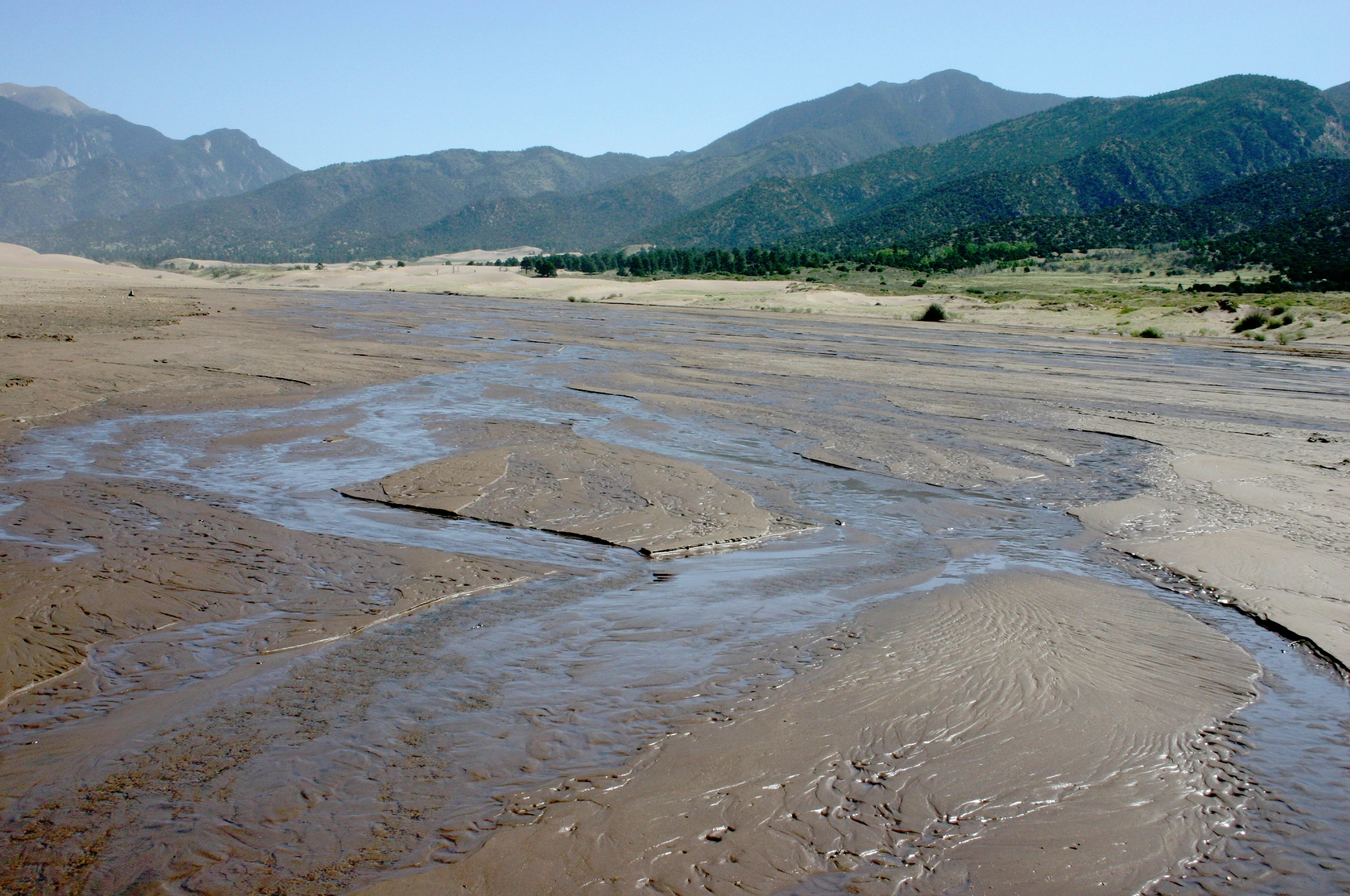
Medano Creek

The Herard family—after whom Mount Herard is named—established a ranch and homestead along Medano Creek in 1875, using the old Medano Pass Road to travel to and from their home. The modern unpaved road follows the old route and is open only to four-wheel drive, and high-clearance vehicles as it passes through deep sand, rises to Medano Pass, and continues east into the Wet Mountain Valley. The Herards grazed and bred cattle in the mountain meadows, raised horses, and established a trout hatchery in the stream. Other families homesteaded near the dunes as well, including the Teofilo Trujillo family whose sheep and cattle ranch in the valley later became part of the Medano–Zapata Ranch, owned by the Nature Conservancy since 1999. The Trujillo's extant homestead and the ruins of a destroyed one were declared a National Historic Landmark in 2004. Frank and Virginia Wellington built a cabin and hand-dug the irrigation ditch that parallels Wellington Ditch Trail located south of the park campground.

Gold and silver rushes occurred around the Rockies after 1853, bringing miners by the thousands into the state and stimulating mining businesses that are still in operation. Numerous small strikes occurred in the mountains around the San Luis Valley. People had frequently speculated that gold might be present in the Great Sand Dunes, and local newspapers ran articles in the 1920s estimating its worth at anywhere from 17 cents/ton to $3/ton (equivalent to $3/ton to $48/ton today). Active placer mining operations sprang up along Medano Creek, and in 1932 the Volcanic Mining Company established a gold mill designed to recover gold from the sand. Although minute quantities of gold were recovered, the technique was too labor-intensive, the stream too seasonal, and the pay-out too small to support any business for long.

=== Preservation ===
The idea that the dunes could be destroyed by gold mining or concrete manufacturing alarmed residents of Alamosa and Monte Vista. By the 1920s, the dunes had become a source of pride for local people, and a potential source of tourist dollars for local businesses. Members of the P.E.O. Sisterhood sponsored a bill to Congress asking for national monument status for Great Sand Dunes. Widely supported by local people, the bill was signed into law in 1932 by President Herbert Hoover. Similar support in the late 1990s resulted in the monument's expansion into a national park and preserve in 2000–2004.

== Geology ==
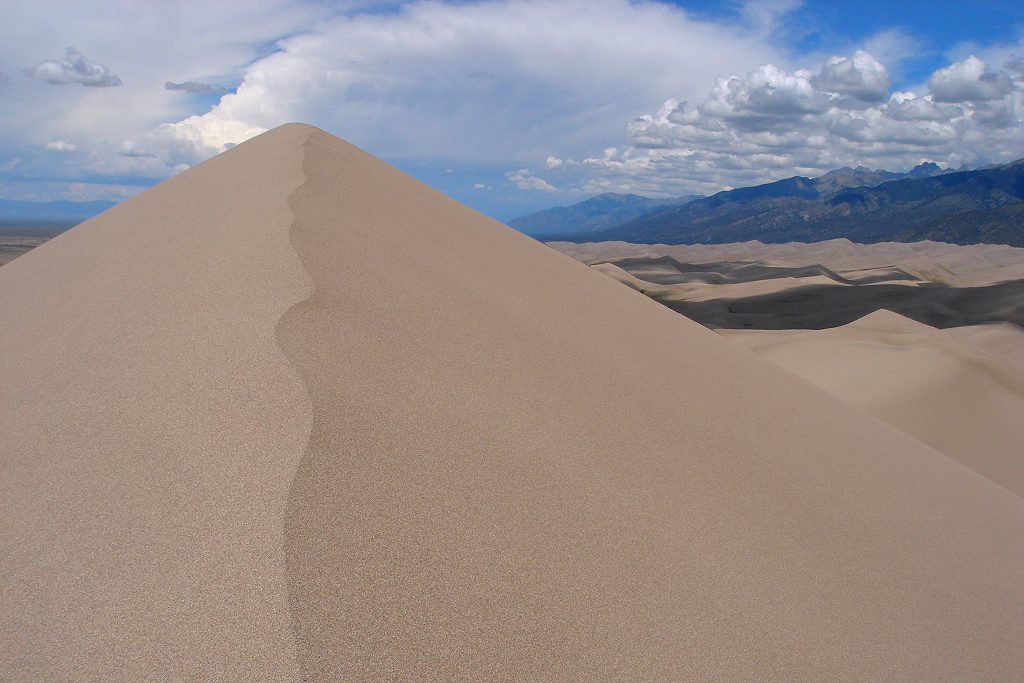
Summit of Star Dune, the tallest dune in the park, and the Sangre de Cristo Range

The park contains the tallest and widest sand dunes in North America, rising to a maximum height of 750 feet (229 m) from the floor of the San Luis Valley on the western base of the Sangre de Cristo Range. The dunes cover an area of about 30 sq mi (78 km^{2}) and are estimated to contain over 1.2 cubic miles (5 billion cubic metres) of sand.

The creation of the San Luis Valley began when the Sangre de Cristo Range was uplifted in the rotation of a large tectonic plate. The San Juan Mountains to the west of the valley were created through extended and dramatic volcanic activity. The San Luis Valley encompasses the area between the two mountain ranges and is roughly the size of the state of Connecticut. Sediments from both mountain ranges filled the deep chasm of the valley, along with huge amounts of water from melting glaciers and rain. The presence of larger rocks along Medano Creek at the base of the dunes, elsewhere on the valley floor, and in buried deposits indicates that some of the sediment has been washed down in torrential flash floods.

In 2002, geologists discovered lakebed deposits on hills in the southern part of the valley, confirming theories of a huge lake that once covered much of the San Luis Valley floor. The body of water was named Lake Alamosa after the largest town in the valley. Lake Alamosa suddenly receded after it broke through volcanic deposits in the southern end of the valley. The water then drained through the Rio Grande, likely forming the steep Rio Grande Gorge near Taos, New Mexico. Smaller lakes still covered the valley floor, including two broad lakes on the northeastern side of the valley. Large amounts of sediment from the volcanic San Juan Mountains continued to wash down into these lakes, along with some sand from the Sangre de Cristo Range. Climate change later significantly reduced these lakes, leaving behind the sand sheet. Remnants of these lakes still exist in the form of sabkha wetlands.

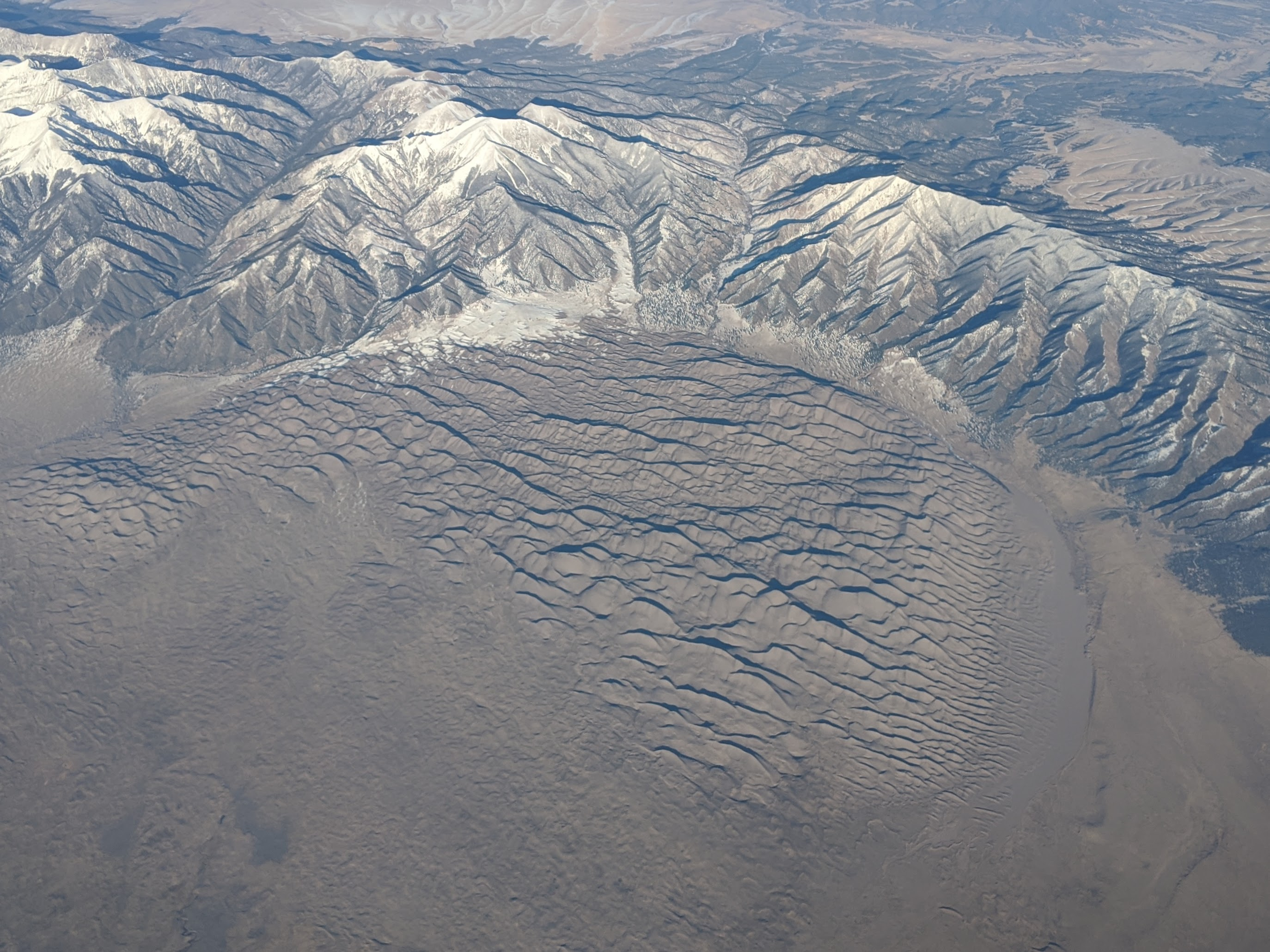
Aerial view of the dunes and the Sangre de Cristo Range

Sand that was left behind after the lakes receded blew with the predominant southwest winds toward a low curve in the Sangre de Cristo Range. The wind funnels toward three mountain passes—Mosca, Medano, and Music Passes—and the sand accumulates in this natural pocket. The winds blow from the valley floor toward the mountains, but during storms, the winds blow back toward the valley. These opposing wind directions cause the dunes to grow vertically. Two mountain streams—Medano and Sand Creeks—also capture sand from the mountainside of the dune field and carry it around the dunes and back to the valley floor. The creeks then disappear into the sand sheet, and the sand blows back into the dune field. Barchan and transverse dunes form near these creeks. The combination of opposing winds, a huge supply of sand from the valley floor, and the sand-recycling action of the creeks are all part of the reason that these are the tallest dunes in North America.

Sufficient vegetation has grown on the valley floor and there is little sand blowing into the main dune field from the valley; however, small parabolic dunes continue to originate in the sand sheet and migrate across grasslands, joining the main dunefield. Some of these migrating dunes become covered by grasses and shrubs and stop migrating. The dune system is fairly stable as the opposing wind directions balance each other out over time. Also, the main dune field is moist beneath a thin layer of dry surface sand. While the top few inches of sand are blown around during windstorms, the moist sand remains largely in place.

Scientists estimate that Lake Alamosa disappeared about 440,000 years ago, but the dunes themselves apparently originate from sand deposits from later, smaller lakes. A relatively new dating process, optically stimulated luminescence (OSL), is still in development. This method takes core samples of sand from deep within a dune and attempts to measure how long quartz grains have been buried in the dark. If the deepest sand deposits can be accurately dated, the age of the dunes could be determined. Samples of sand from deep in the dunes have returned OSL dates varying between a few hundred years to tens of thousands of years old. The oldest dated deposits found so far would have accumulated in the late Pleistocene epoch, during the middle years of the current ice age's third stage.

The dunes contain dark areas which are deposits of magnetite, a mineral that has eroded out of the Sangre de Cristo Range. Magnetite is both attracted to a magnet and can be magnetized to become a magnet itself; it is the most magnetic mineral in nature. Magnetite is an oxide of iron which is heavier than the surrounding particles of sand. When overlying sand is removed by wind, magnetite deposits stay in place and are visible as dark patches in the dune field.

== Geography ==
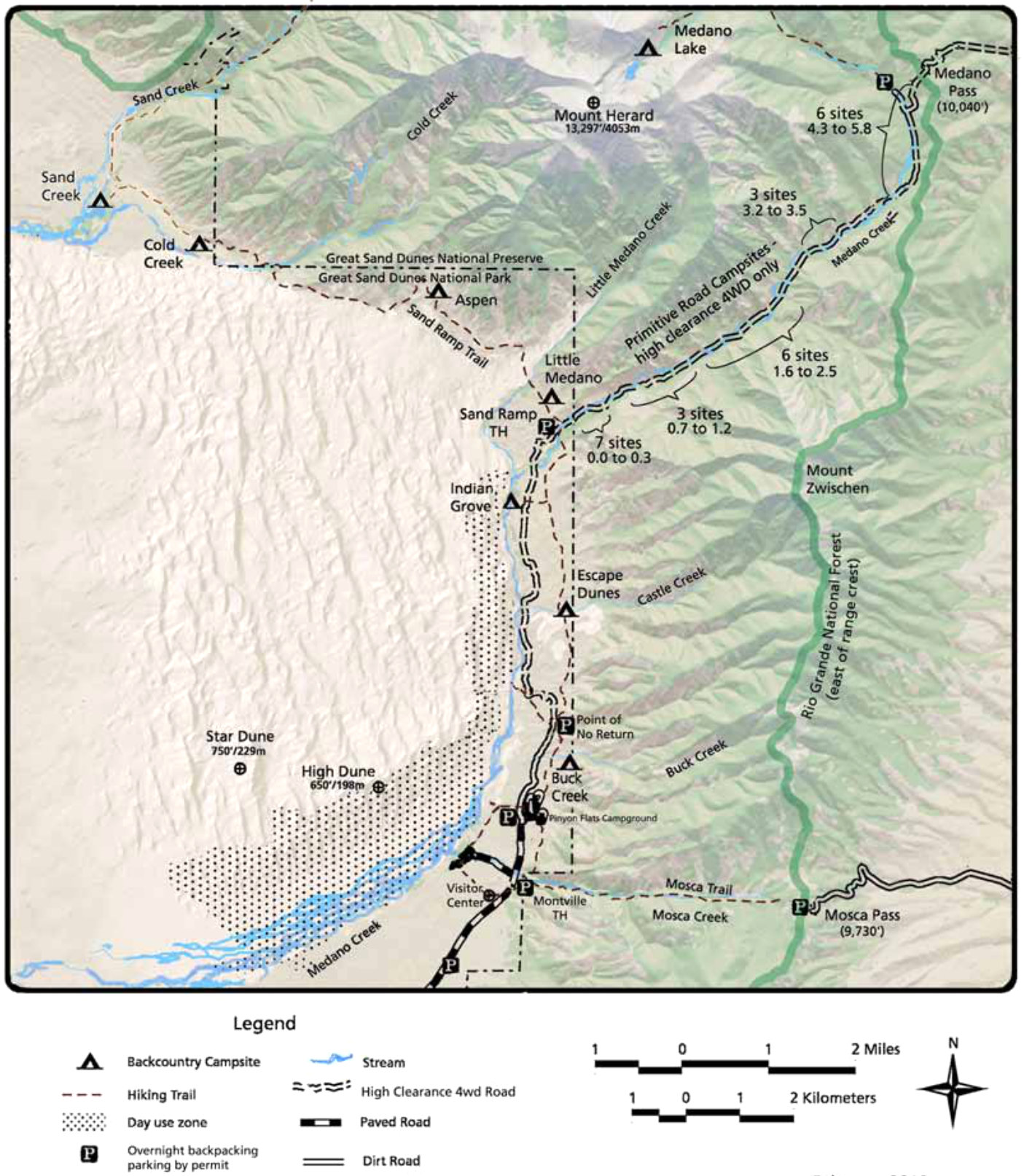
Map demarcating the national park area (dunefields) and the national preserve (mountains)

Great Sand Dunes National Park and Preserve is located in Saguache and Alamosa Counties, Colorado at approximately 37.75° north latitude and 105.5° west longitude. The national park is located in the San Luis Valley while the national preserve is located to the east in an adjacent section of the Sangre de Cristo Range of the Rocky Mountains. Elevations range from 7,515 ft (2,291 m) in the valley west of the dunes, to 13,604 ft (4,146 m) at the summit of Tijeras Peak in the northern part of the preserve.

The dunes cover an area of about 30 sq mi (78 km^{2}) while the surrounding relatively flat sand sheet which feeds the large dunes is actually the largest component of the entire dunes system, containing about 90% of all the sand in the park. The forested and often snowcapped mountains exceeding 13,000 ft (4,000 m) to the east is the most prominent feature, towering over the high dunes. Other features include snow-fed creeks originating high in the mountains, and several alpine lakes. Two spring-fed creeks in the sand sheet along with a few small lakes in the valley's sabkha section southwest of the dunes create a wetland that nurtures wildlife.

The main dune field measures roughly 4 mi (6.4 km) east-to-west and 6 mi (9.7 km) north-to-south, with an adjacent 6 sq mi (16 km^{2}) area to the northwest called the Star Dune Complex, for a total of about 30 sq mi (78 km^{2}). The park and preserve together are approximately 15 mi (24 km) east-to-west at the widest point, and approximately 15 mi (24 km) north-to-south, also at the widest point. The park encompasses 107,342 acres (167.7 sq mi; 434.4 km^{2}), while the preserve protects an additional 41,686 acres (65.1 sq mi; 168.7 km^{2}) for a total of 149,028 acres (232.9 sq mi; 603.1 km^{2}).

The Rio Grande National Forest is located to the north and southeast while the remaining forested slopes directly to the east of the dunes were redesignated the Great Sand Dunes National Preserve. The San Isabel National Forest is located to the east of the preserve just beyond the ridge of the Sangre de Cristo Range. Private property abuts most of the southern boundary of the park. The San Luis Lakes State Wildlife Area lies adjacent to the southwestern corner of the park, while the Rio Grande flows through the valley farther to the southwest. The Baca National Wildlife Refuge lies adjacent to the west, and the slopes of the San Juan Mountains begin at the western edge of the valley. Private property of the Baca Grande subdivision of Crestone lies adjacent to the northwest.

The nearest city is Alamosa which is about 30 mi (48 km) away by road to the southwest. The nearest towns are Crestone to the north, Mosca and Hooper to the west, Blanca and Fort Garland to the south, and Gardner to the east. Colorado Springs and Denver are located a few hours away by car to the northeast. The major roads through the San Luis Valley are U.S. Route 160 on an east–west alignment passing south of the park, and U.S. Route 285 on a north–south alignment passing west of the park and generally parallel to Colorado State Highway 17, which is the closer of the two north–south roadways.

=== Climate ===
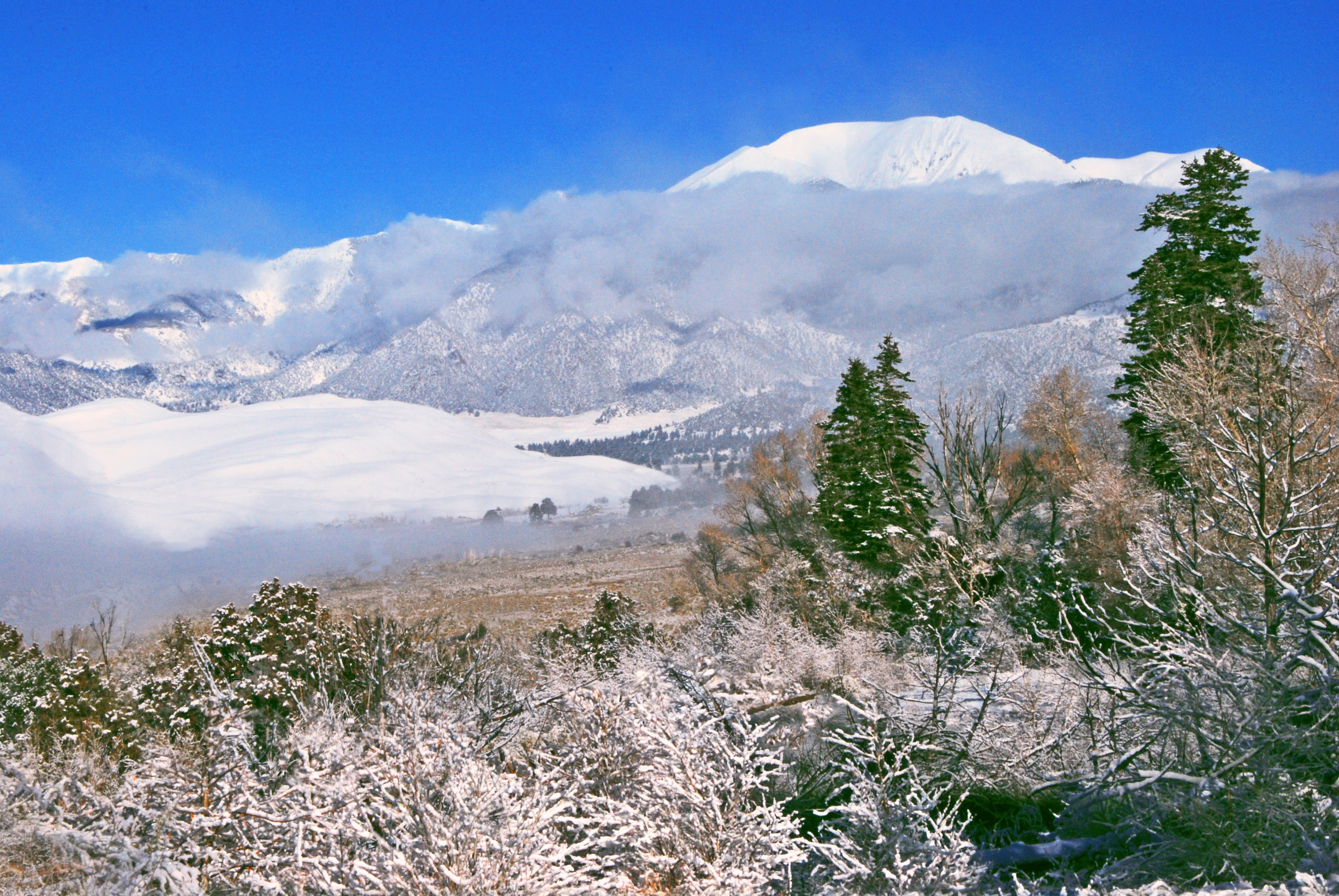
Snow-covered dunes and Mount Herard

The Great Sand Dunes are located in the high elevation desert of the San Luis Valley at about 7,694 ft (2,345 m), just west of the Sangre de Cristo Range. The dunefield's Köppen climate classification type is cold semi-arid (BSk), while the mountainous preserve's climate type is warm-summer humid continental (Dfb), at an average elevation of 10,970 ft (3,344 m). Summer high temperatures are moderate with an average high temperature slightly above 80 °F (27 °C) in July, which is the warmest month. The park's large spread between high and low temperatures, about 25–30 °F (14–17 °C), is typical of a high desert climate. Low temperatures during winter nights can be extremely cold, with average low temperatures well below 32 °F (0 °C) and record low temperatures below 0 °F (−18 °C) from November through April. Precipitation is very low on the dunes, averaging just 11.13 inches (283 mm) of rainfall per year. A high evaporation rate on the dunes qualifies the area as a desert, even though precipitation exceeds 10 inches (250 mm).

Spring conditions vary greatly, from mild and sunny to cold and snowy, with occasional high winds in the afternoon. March is the snowiest month, though some days are above 50 °F (10 °C). In late spring, when Medano Creek usually has its peak flow, snow, and high winds are still possible. In summer, daytime high temperatures average 75–80 °F (24–27 °C); however, sand surface temperatures can soar to 150 °F (66 °C) on sunny afternoons. Summer nights are cool—the park is located 8,200 ft (2,500 m) above sea level—with nighttime temperatures often dropping below 50 °F (10 °C). Afternoon thundershowers are common in July and August with cool winds, heavy rain, and lightning. Fall is generally mild, with Indian summer days when temperatures reach or exceed 60 °F (16 °C), but nighttime temperatures drop below freezing. Occasional fall storms bring icy rain or snow. Cold temperatures well below freezing are typical in winter, although the sunshine is generally abundant and the dry air does not feel as cold as more humid areas. The average winter high temperatures are just above freezing even in January, which is the coldest month.

Climate data for Great Sand Dunes National Park and Preserve, Colorado, 1991–2020 normals, extremes 1950–present
Month	Jan	Feb	Mar	Apr	May	Jun	Jul	Aug	Sep	Oct	Nov	Dec	Year
Record high °F (°C)	67 (19)	63 (17)	78 (26)	78 (26)	89 (32)	96 (36)	94 (34)	90 (32)	87 (31)	80 (27)	67 (19)	61 (16)	96 (36)
Mean maximum °F (°C)	46.8 (8.2)	51.3 (10.7)	63.2 (17.3)	70.2 (21.2)	78.4 (25.8)	86.9 (30.5)	88.3 (31.3)	85.7 (29.8)	81.0 (27.2)	72.7 (22.6)	60.1 (15.6)	49.1 (9.5)	89.2 (31.8)
Mean daily maximum °F (°C)	33.4 (0.8)	38.8 (3.8)	48.5 (9.2)	55.8 (13.2)	65.9 (18.8)	77.4 (25.2)	80.8 (27.1)	78.1 (25.6)	71.6 (22.0)	59.6 (15.3)	45.5 (7.5)	34.1 (1.2)	57.5 (14.2)
Daily mean °F (°C)	22.3 (−5.4)	27.5 (−2.5)	36.1 (2.3)	42.5 (5.8)	51.9 (11.1)	62.5 (16.9)	66.3 (19.1)	64.1 (17.8)	57.5 (14.2)	46.2 (7.9)	33.6 (0.9)	23.1 (−4.9)	44.5 (6.9)
Mean daily minimum °F (°C)	11.3 (−11.5)	16.2 (−8.8)	23.7 (−4.6)	29.2 (−1.6)	37.8 (3.2)	47.6 (8.7)	51.7 (10.9)	50.0 (10.0)	43.5 (6.4)	32.8 (0.4)	21.6 (−5.8)	12.0 (−11.1)	31.5 (−0.3)
Mean minimum °F (°C)	−4.1 (−20.1)	−0.9 (−18.3)	7.2 (−13.8)	15.0 (−9.4)	25.1 (−3.8)	36.0 (2.2)	44.5 (6.9)	42.9 (6.1)	31.3 (−0.4)	16.1 (−8.8)	4.2 (−15.4)	−3.9 (−19.9)	−7.6 (−22.0)
Record low °F (°C)	−25 (−32)	−22 (−30)	−9 (−23)	−6 (−21)	15 (−9)	25 (−4)	36 (2)	33 (1)	22 (−6)	0 (−18)	−12 (−24)	−19 (−28)	−25 (−32)
Average precipitation inches (mm)	0.58 (15)	0.44 (11)	0.88 (22)	1.19 (30)	1.19 (30)	0.73 (19)	2.10 (53)	1.92 (49)	1.31 (33)	0.86 (22)	0.51 (13)	0.49 (12)	12.20 (310)
Average snowfall inches (cm)	8.1 (21)	6.2 (16)	8.5 (22)	7.9 (20)	1.7 (4.3)	0.0 (0.0)	0.0 (0.0)	0.0 (0.0)	0.0 (0.0)	2.8 (7.1)	5.6 (14)	7.0 (18)	47.8 (121)
Average precipitation days (≥ 0.01 in)	4.9	5.2	5.6	6.1	7.3	5.2	10.2	11.3	7.1	5.4	4.0	5.4	77.7
Average snowy days (≥ 0.1 in)	5.3	5.1	4.5	4.3	0.9	0.0	0.0	0.0	0.0	1.7	3.4	5.6	30.8
Source: NOAA

== Ecology ==
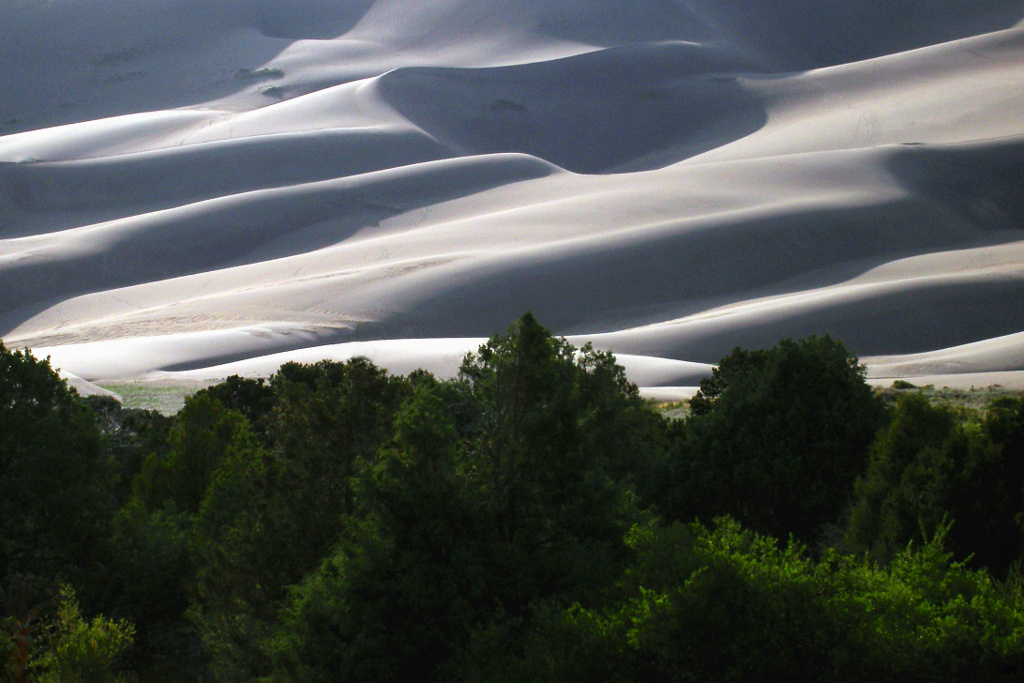
Reversing dunes above the edge of the montane forest

The four primary components of the Great Sand Dunes system are the mountain watershed, the dune field, the sand sheet, and the sabkha. The mountain watershed receives heavy snow and rain which feeds creeks that flow down from alpine tundra and lakes, through subalpine and montane woodlands, and finally around the main dunefield. Sand that has blown from the valley floor is captured in streams and carried back toward the valley. As creeks disappear into the valley floor, the sand is picked up and carried to the dune field once again. The recycling action of water and wind, along with a 7% moisture content below the dry surface holding the sand together, contributes to the great height of the dunes.

The dune field is composed of reversing dunes, transverse dunes—also called crescentic or barchan dunes—and star dunes. The sand sheet is the largest component of the system, comprising sandy grasslands that extend around three sides of the dune field. Almost 90% of the sand deposit is found in the sand sheet, while the remainder is found in the dune field. Small parabolic dunes form in the sand sheet and then migrate into the main dunefield. Nabkha Dunes form around vegetation. The sabkha forms where sand is seasonally saturated by rising groundwater. When the water evaporates away in late summer, minerals similar to baking soda cement sand grains together into a hard, white crust. Areas of sabkha can be found throughout western portions of the sand sheet, wherever the water table meets the surface. Some wetlands in the sabkha are deeper with plentiful plants and animals, while others are shallow and salty.

=== Flora ===
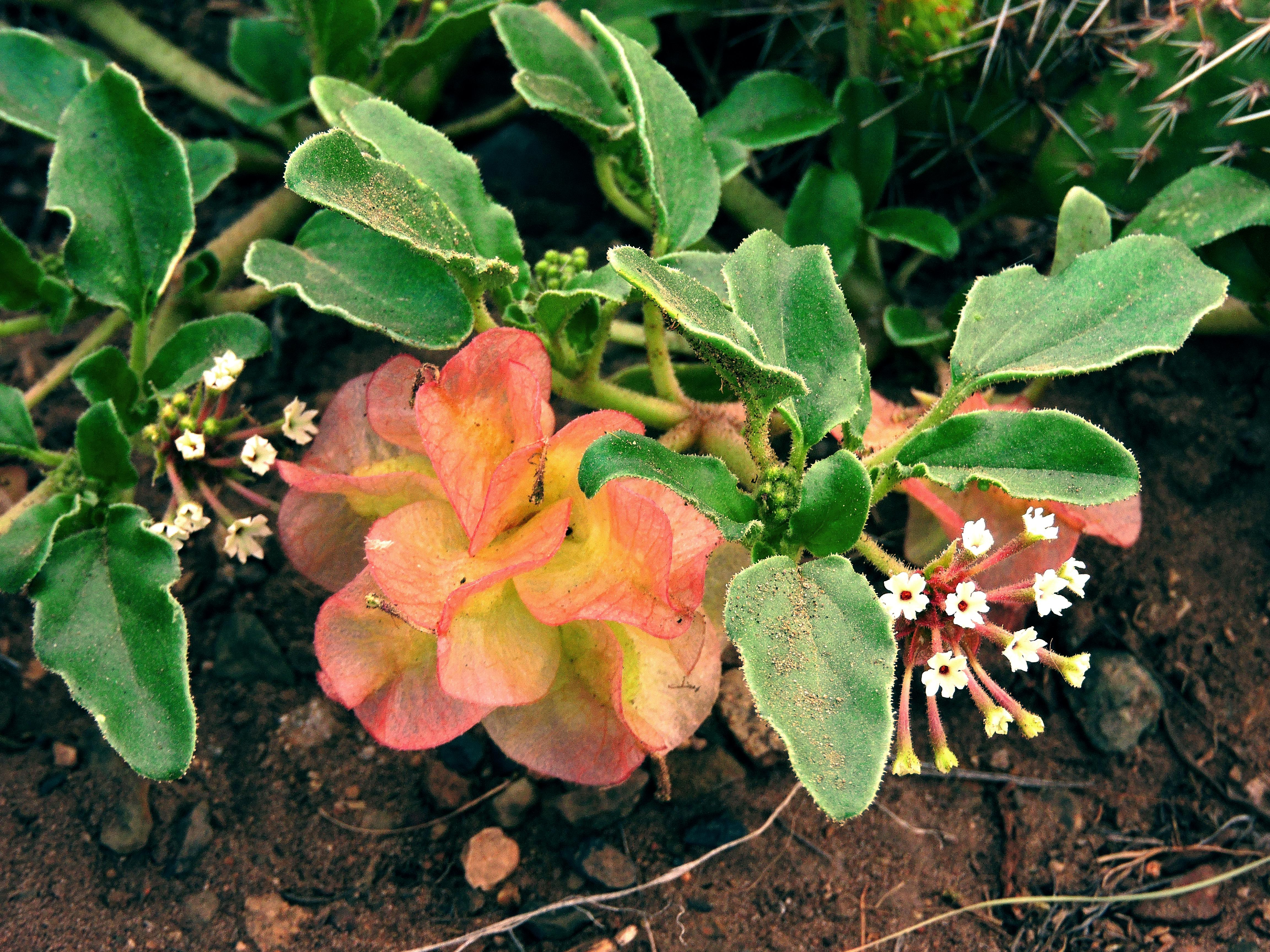
Small-flowered sand verbena

There are hundreds of plant species in the park and preserve, adapted for environments as diverse as alpine tundra and warm water wetlands. Trees include aspen, Douglas fir, pinyon pine, ponderosa pine, Rocky Mountain juniper, three-leaf sumac, bristlecone pine, red osier dogwood, and narrow-leaf cottonwood.

Among the flowering plants are alpine phlox, dwarf clover, alpine forget-me-not, alpine avens, paintbrush flowers, lousewort, blue-purple penstemon, aspen daisy, western paintbrush, elephantella, snow buttercups, scurfpea, Indian ricegrass, blowout grass, prairie sunflower, Rocky Mountain beeplant, rubber rabbitbrush, speargrass, small-flowered sand-verbena, narrowleaf yucca, prickly pear cactus, Rocky Mountain iris, and white water buttercup.

Inland saltgrass is the primary type of grass around the Sabkha wetlands in the park.

=== Fauna ===
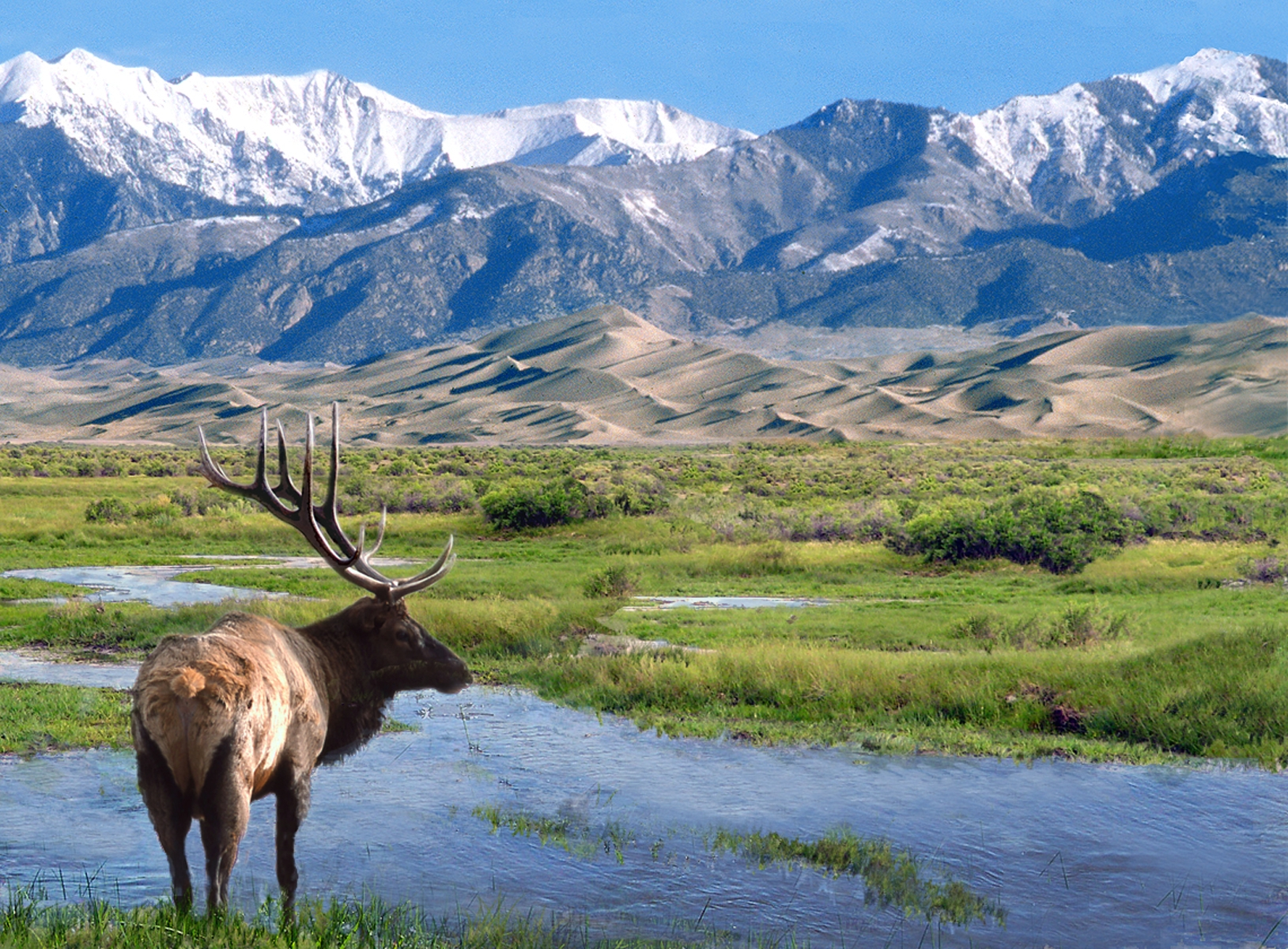
Elk at Big Spring Creek

Mammals include—from alpine tundra to low elevation grasslands—pika, yellow-bellied marmot, bighorn sheep, black bear, snowshoe hare, Abert's squirrel, gray and red foxes, cougar, coyote, mule deer, water shrew, beaver, porcupine, kangaroo rat, badger, pronghorn, and elk. More than 2000 bison are ranched within park boundaries on private land, owned by The Nature Conservancy, that is closed to the public.

More than 250 species of birds have been documented in the park and preserve. Many species nest in the mountains, forests, grasslands, or wetlands during the summer. From higher to lower elevations, and dependent on season, some of the bird species include the brown-capped rosy finch, white-tailed ptarmigan, red-breasted nuthatch, peregrine falcon, mountain bluebird, northern pygmy owl, dusky grouse, hummingbird (four species), western tanager, burrowing owl, bald eagle, golden eagle, sandhill crane, American avocet, and great blue heron.

Various reptiles live in the park, such as the short-horned lizard, fence lizard, many-lined skink, bullsnake, and garter snake.

Fish living in the park's streams include the Rio Grande cutthroat trout, Rio Grande sucker (Catostomus plebeius), and fathead minnow.

Amphibians include the tiger salamander, chorus frog, northern leopard frog, spadefoot toad, Great Plains toad, and Woodhouse's toad.

The park harbors several endemic insects including the Great Sand Dunes tiger beetle, a circus beetle (Eleodes hirtipennis), Werner's (Amblyderus werneri) and Triplehorn's (Amblyderus triplehorni) ant-like flower beetle, as well as undescribed species of clown beetle, noctuid moth, and robber fly. More than a thousand different kinds of arthropods have been found at the Great Sand Dunes.

=== Ecosystems ===
Alpine tundra is the highest elevation ecosystem at Great Sand Dunes where the conditions are too harsh for trees to survive, but wildflowers, pikas, yellow-bellied marmots, ptarmigans, and bighorn sheep thrive. The tundra begins about 11,700 ft (3,600 m) and continues upward to the highest peaks in the park. At subalpine elevations near the tree line grow krummholz (meaning "crooked wood")—trees that are stunted and twisted due to high winds, snow, ice, short growing seasons, and shallow, poorly developed soils. The transition zone between the subalpine forest and alpine tundra is an important refuge during storms for some mammals and birds who primarily live in the tundra. Bristlecone and limber pines grow at an extremely slow rate, with small statures that belie their true ages as some are more than a thousand years old.

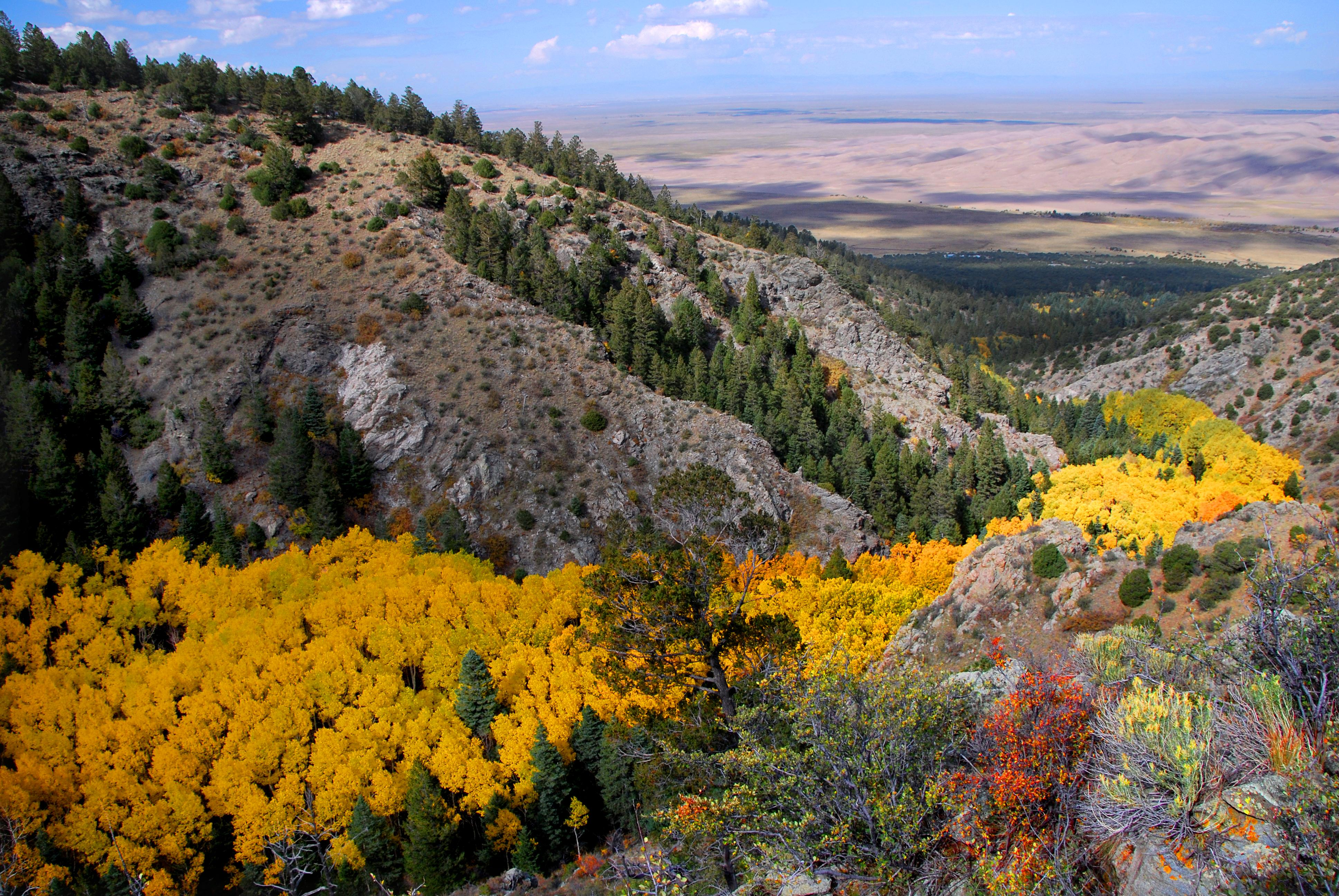
Aspens in a riparian zone

Subalpine forests and meadows capture heavy snow in winter and soaking rains in summer. The highest diversity of Rocky Mountain species of plants and animals is found in this ecosystem. Subalpine forest extends from 9,500 ft (2,900 m) to tree line at 11,700 ft (3,600 m). Montane forests and woodlands are found along the drier foothills at approximately 8,000 ft (2,400 m) to 9,500 ft (2,900 m). Pinyon-juniper and ponderosa pine woodlands are found on open, drier slopes, while cottonwood and aspen trees are in drainages. Cougars hunt mule deer here at night. Owls, dusky grouse, turkeys, and bullsnakes all find habitat in these drier, open woodlands.

The riparian zone follows creeks through the subalpine and montane ecosystems at Great Sand Dunes. Cottonwood and aspen trees, red osier dogwood, and alder grow well in this wet environment, in turn providing shade and habitat for black bears, water shrews, and western tanagers. Rio Grande cutthroat trout are found in Medano Creek.

While the top few inches of the dune field are often dry, the dunes are moist year-round due to ongoing precipitation. The moisture content of 7% beneath the surface sand allows species such as Ord's kangaroo rat, Great Sand Dunes tiger beetle, scurfpea, and blowout grass to survive here. Many animals visit the dunes from other habitats, including elk, pronghorn, bison, coyotes, bobcats, and raptors.

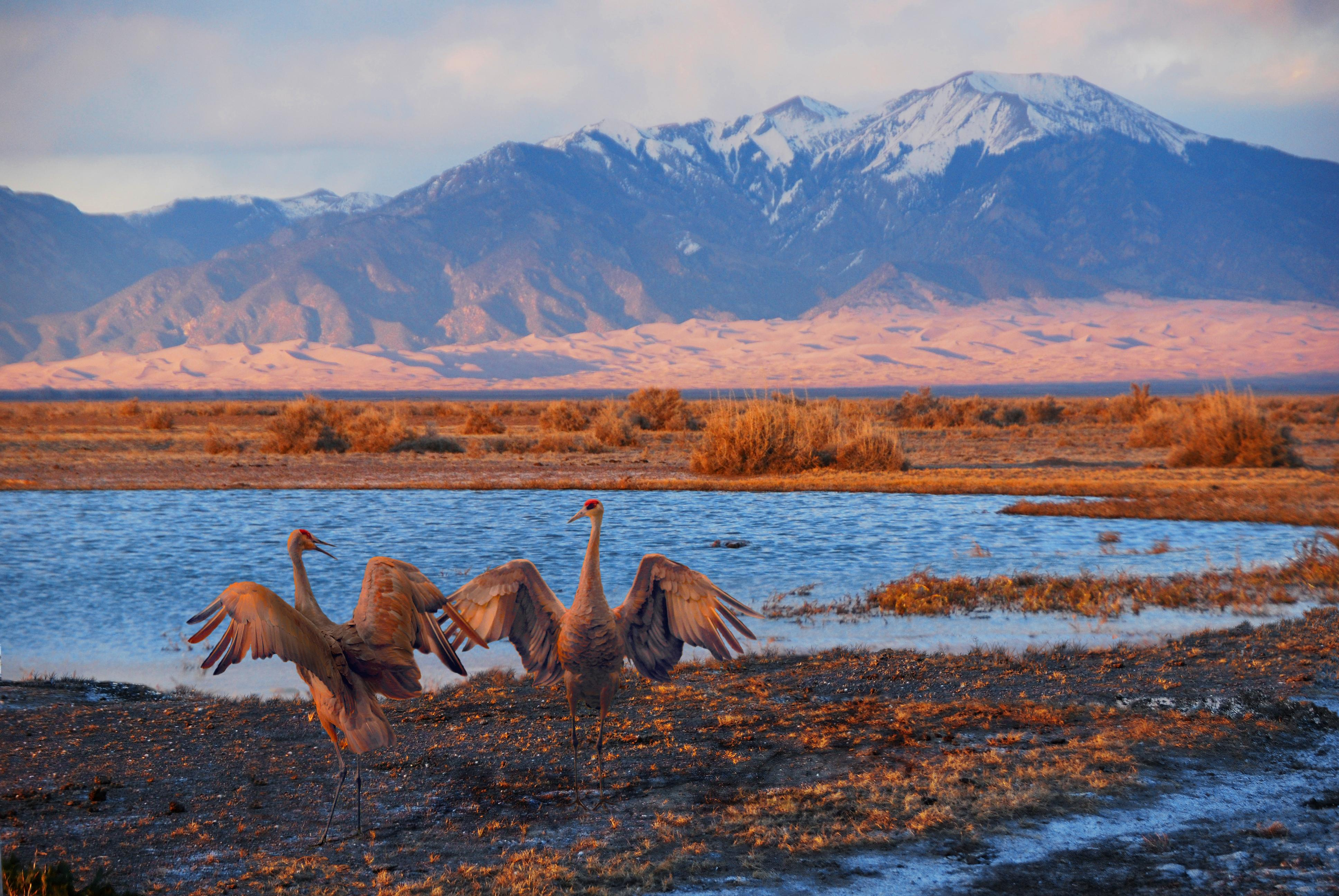
Sandhill cranes in wetland

The sand sheet includes extensive grasslands and shrublands that surround the dune field on three sides, from 7,500 ft (2,300 m) to 8,200 ft (2,500 m). The sand sheet varies from wet meadows to the cool-grass prairie to desert shrubland, depending on proximity to groundwater and soil type. Elk and pronghorn are common, while burrowing owls nest in the ground and other raptors float through the skies searching for mice, kangaroo rats, and short-horned lizards.

The sabkha is a wetland region where groundwater rises and falls seasonally, leaving white alkali deposits on the surface. Inland saltgrass is common in this area. Toads can reproduce in sabkha wetlands when they are seasonally filled with sufficient fresh water. Shore birds such as the American avocet hunt tadpoles and insects in the shallow water. Wetlands speckle the San Luis Valley and are important habitats for sandhill cranes, shore birds, amphibians, dragonflies, and freshwater shrimp. Grassland species such as elk also use these waters for drinking. The sabkha and wetlands are at approximately 7,500 ft (2,300 m) in elevation.

== Features ==
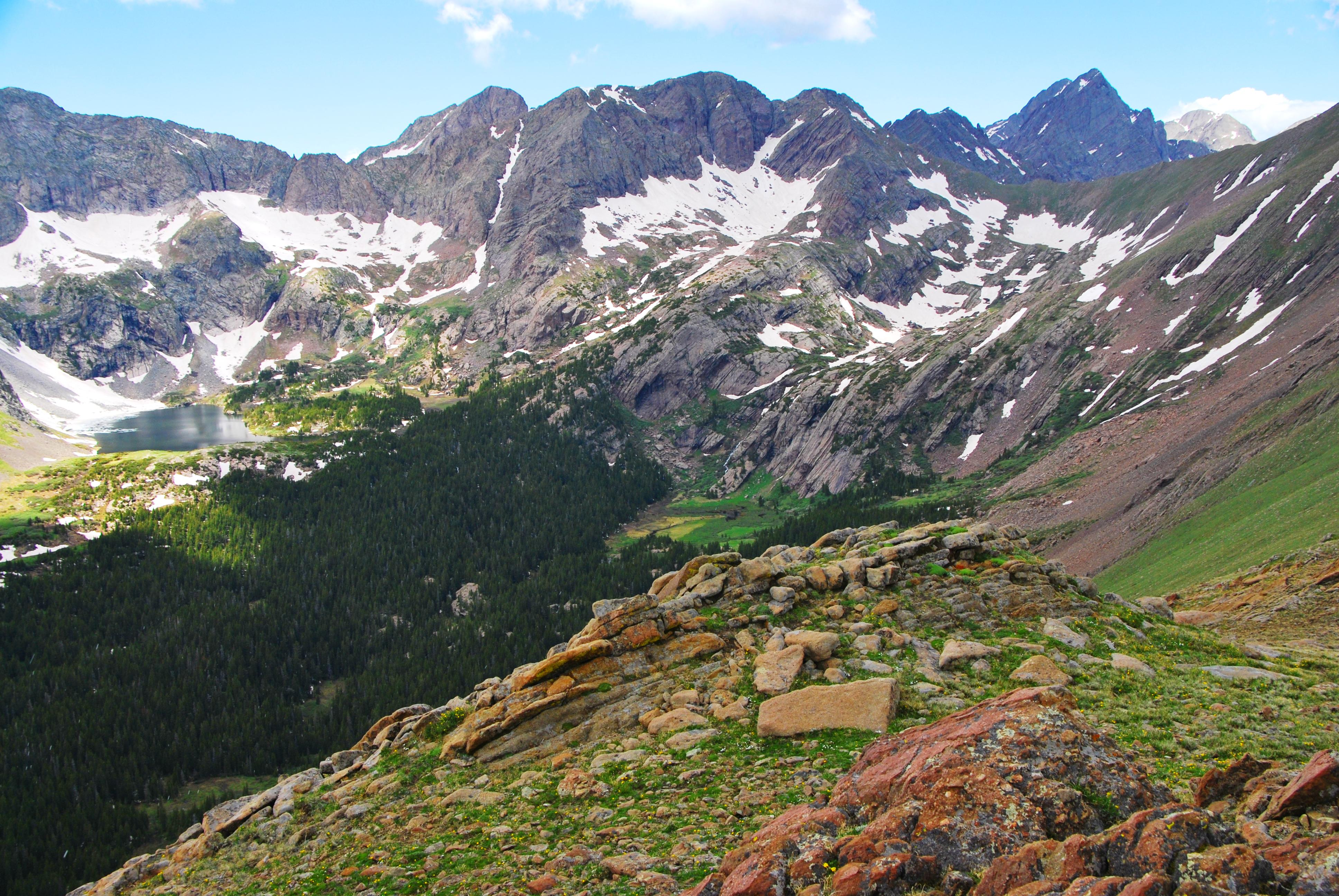
Upper Sand Creek Lake and Basin from Marble Mountain

The park preserves the tallest sand dunes in North America, as well as alpine lakes and tundra, mountain peaks over 13,000 feet (3,962 m) in elevation, mixed conifer forests, grasslands, and wetlands.

Medano Creek, which borders the east side of the dunes, never finds a permanent and stable streambed as fresh sand falls in the creek. Small underwater sand ridges that act like dams form and break down, creating surges of water that resemble waves. The surges occur at an average interval of about 20 seconds. In a high-water year, the surges can be as high as 20 in (51 cm). The "surge flow" mainly occurs during the peak flow period from late May to early June in most years.

Big Spring Creek is a unique spring-fed creek formed by an unconfined aquifer that creates wetlands that support rare species and plant communities in a generally arid area. The creek was designated a National Natural Landmark in 2012.

== Recreation ==
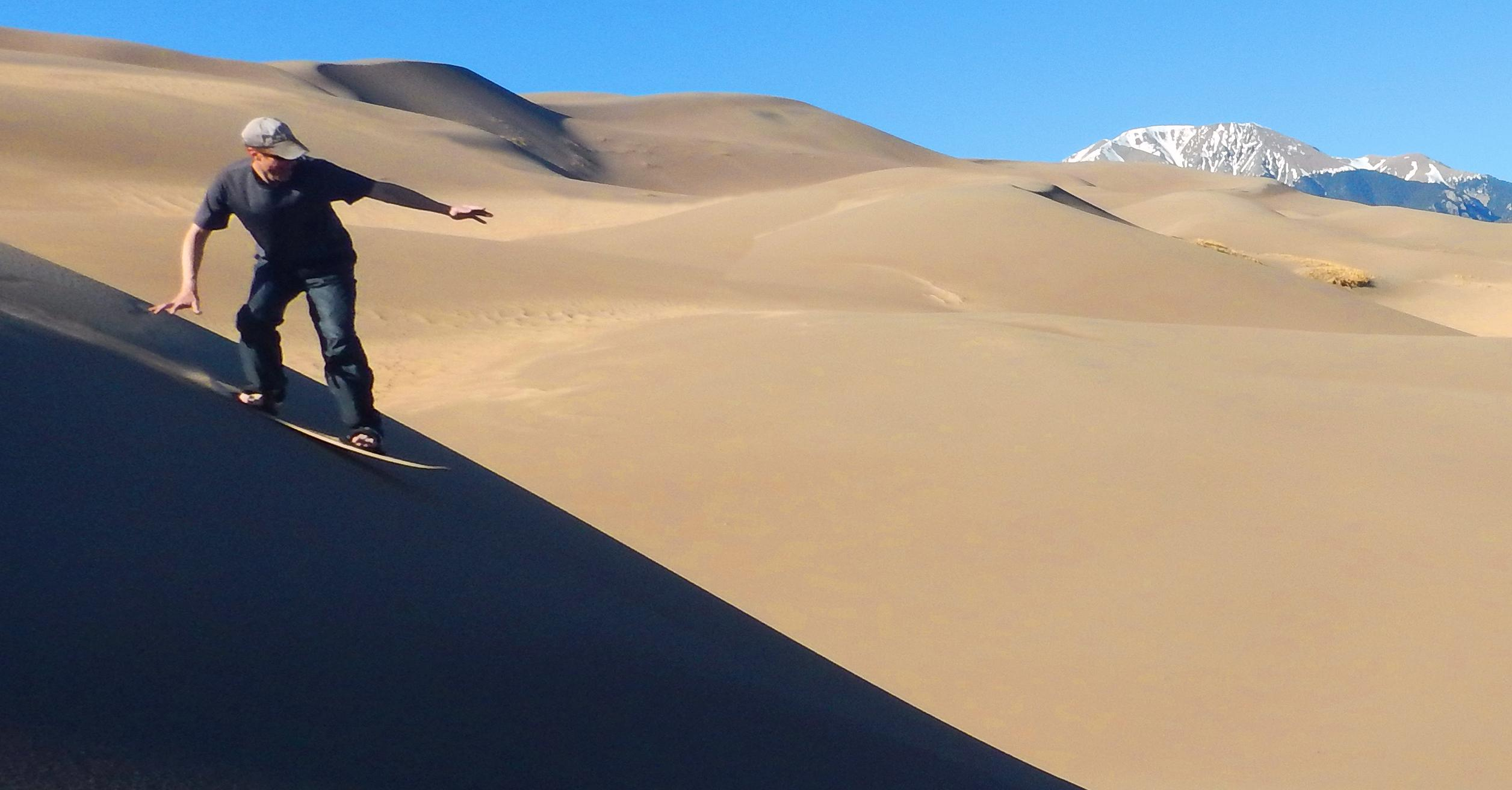
Sandboarding

Accessing the dunes requires walking across the wide and shallow Medano Creek. The creek typically flows past the main dunes parking area from late April through late June, with peak flow occurring from late May to early June in most years. In other months, the creek is usually only a few inches deep, if there is any water at all. Hiking is permitted throughout the dunes, with the warning that the sand can get very hot in the summer, up to 150 °F (66 °C). Sand wheelchairs are available at the visitor center. Sandboards and sand sleds can be rented just outside the park entrance or in Alamosa which is the closest city.

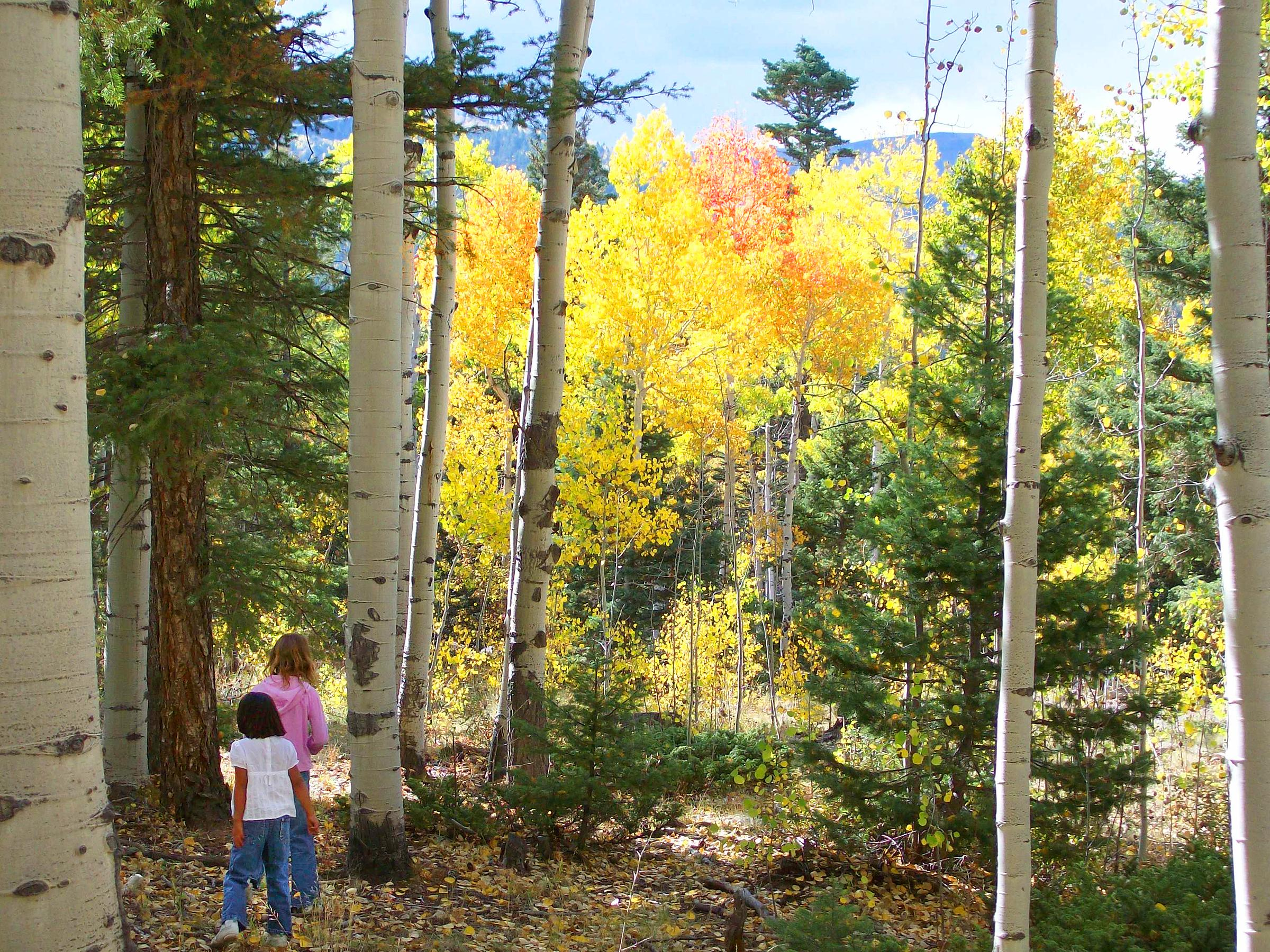
Mosca Pass Trail

Mosca Pass Trail is a 7 mi (11 km) roundtrip hike that follows a small creek through aspen and evergreen forests to Mosca Pass—elevation 9,737 ft (2,968 m)—in the Sangre de Cristo Range. American Indians and early settlers used this route for travel between the San Luis Valley and the Wet Mountain Valley to the east. Several trails located in the northeastern section of the park lead to alpine lakes high in the mountains. A trail to Medano Lake and the summit of Mount Herard is located off Medano Pass Road. A trail along Sand Creek leads to the Sand Creek Lakes and Music Pass—elevation 11,380 ft (3,470 m)—with a view of the Upper Sand Creek basin. Spur trails along Sand Creek lead to the four alpine lakes which feed the creek and to several 13,000 ft (4,000 m) peaks above the basin. The Sand Ramp Trail traverses between the dune field and the mountains, connecting the park's campground to Medano Pass Road (follow the road up to Medano Lake and Pass), as well as the base of the Sand Creek Trail. Most of the park's grasslands, shrublands and wetlands have no established trails but are generally open to hiking. The Nature Conservancy's Medano Ranch property may only be visited on a guided tour. A fence surrounds the property to contain the Conservancy's bison herd and demarcate the boundaries.

Medano Pass Road is a 22 mi (35 km) four-wheel drive (4WD) road that begins where the main park road ends. The unpaved road crosses Medano Creek nine times and traverses 4 mi (6.4 km) of deep sand. Only street-licensed 4WD motor vehicles or motorcycles, and bicycles are permitted. Fat tire bikes are the only type of bicycle recommended by the park service due to the deep sandy stretches. The road winds around the eastern side of the dune field, up through a forested mountain canyon inside the National Preserve, and then over Medano Pass—elevation 9,982 ft (3,043 m)—at the 11.2 mi (18.0 km) mark. The road then continues down into the Wet Mountain Valley and connects with Colorado State Highway 69. Travelers are advised that hunting is permitted in the National Preserve during the months of autumn.

Most of the national park and the entire national preserve are open to horseback riding and pack animals. Prohibited zones include all developed areas—such as the Pinyon Flats campground, picnic areas, and the visitor center—all paved roadways and many of the hiking trails, along with the dunes area from the parking lot to as far as the High Dune, which is for pedestrian use only. All national park horse camping areas are in the wilderness in designated backcountry campsites or other wilderness areas at least 0.25 mi (0.4 km) from roads or trails. Camping is permitted in most places in the national preserve and at designated sites along the Medano Pass Road, as long as minimum impact guidelines are followed. Permitted pack animals in the national park and the preserve include horses, mules, burros, donkeys, alpacas, and llamas. Overnight guests at the Zapata Ranch may take guided trips into the park; Zapata Partners is the only NPS-licensed provider of horseback riding in the Great Sand Dunes.

The national preserve adjacent to the national park is also managed by the National Park Service and seasonal hunting is permitted there. Sport hunting has regulations which include not pursuing a wounded animal if it leaves the preserve and enters the national park. Mountain lion hunting with dogs is also allowed in the preserve, but unless the dogs have spotted the lion and are pursuing it, they are required to be leashed. Other game species include turkey, bear, bighorn sheep, elk, and mule deer.

== Designations ==
The dunes and surrounding area were designated a national monument in 1932 after a bill—sponsored by the P.E.O. Sisterhood and widely supported by local residents—was signed into law by President Herbert Hoover. The original monument boundaries protected an area of 35,528 acres (55.5 sq mi; 143.8 km^{2}). Similar support in the late 1990s resulted in the monument's redesignation as Great Sand Dunes National Park and Preserve in 2000. The International Union for Conservation of Nature (IUCN) listed the Great Sand Dunes as a protected landscape (management category V) in 2000, including the national park, the preserve, and the adjacent Baca National Wildlife Refuge.

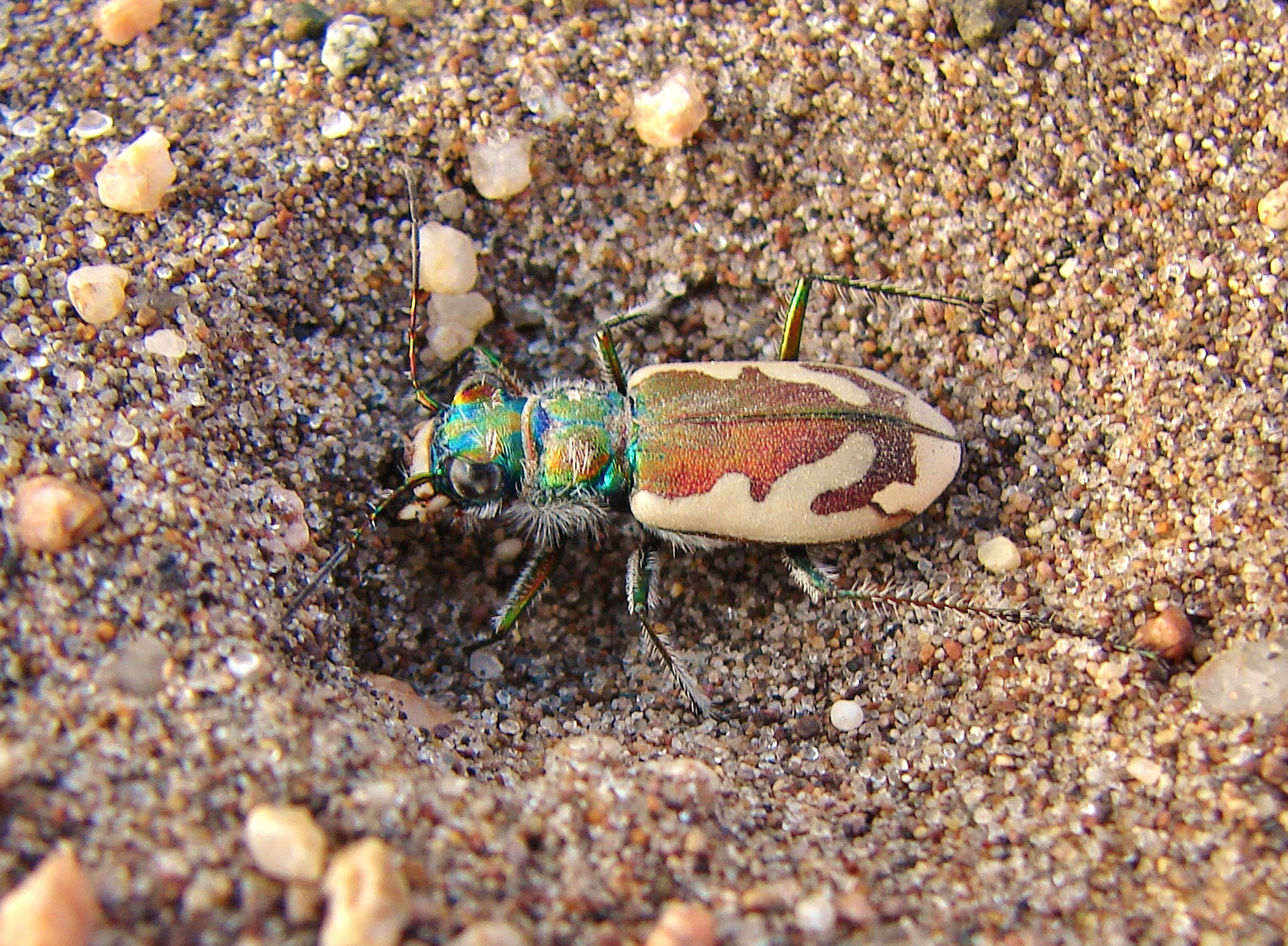
Great Sand Dunes tiger beetle

In 1976, the U.S. Congress designated the Great Sand Dunes Wilderness—a wilderness area encompassing 32,643 acres (51 sq mi; 132 km^{2}) within the monument. This wilderness is the only one in the U.S. that protects a saltbush-greasewood ecosystem and includes the entire dune field as well as much of the area west of the dunes. Congress also designated the Sangre de Cristo Wilderness in 1993, which contains a total of 219,900 acres (343.6 sq mi; 889.9 km^{2}) of mountainous terrain. Most of the Sangre de Cristo Wilderness is managed by the U.S. Forest Service while the National Park Service manages the area that has since been designated a national preserve. Mechanized transport and motorized equipment or vehicles are not permitted in wilderness areas, while ATVs are not permitted anywhere in the national park and preserve. The restrictions of a wilderness designation protect native wildlife such as the endemic Great Sand Dunes tiger beetle from potential extinction caused by human activities. Both of the wilderness area designations exclude the existing road corridors that pass through them, specifically the paved park road and the unpaved Medano Pass Road. The IUCN has included the same 51 square miles (132 km^{2}) of dunes and surrounding sand sheets on their global list of wilderness areas (management category Ib) since 1976.

In 1999, the Nature Conservancy purchased surrounding state-owned land. The land is within the Medano–Zapata Ranch, located to the west and south. Some of the ranch lands are located within the current national park boundary in its southwestern corner, and includes a fenced area that contains a bison herd within 44,000 acres (68.8 sq mi; 178.1 km^{2})—an area that can only be visited on a guided tour. The objective of the Nature Conservancy, as well as the federal and state governments, is to combine conservation and sustainable use of the ecosystem, like the protected area mosaic recommended in the early 1980s for parts of the Yukon in Canada.

The eventual redesignation as Great Sand Dunes National Park and Preserve was authorized on November 22, 2000, when President Bill Clinton signed the Congressionally approved Great Sand Dunes National Park and Preserve Act. The act directed the Secretary of the Interior to "establish the Great Sand Dunes National Park when sufficient land having sufficient diversity of resources has been acquired to warrant its designation." The new designation as a national park and preserve was made official in September 2004 after sufficient land had been acquired, quadrupling its size.

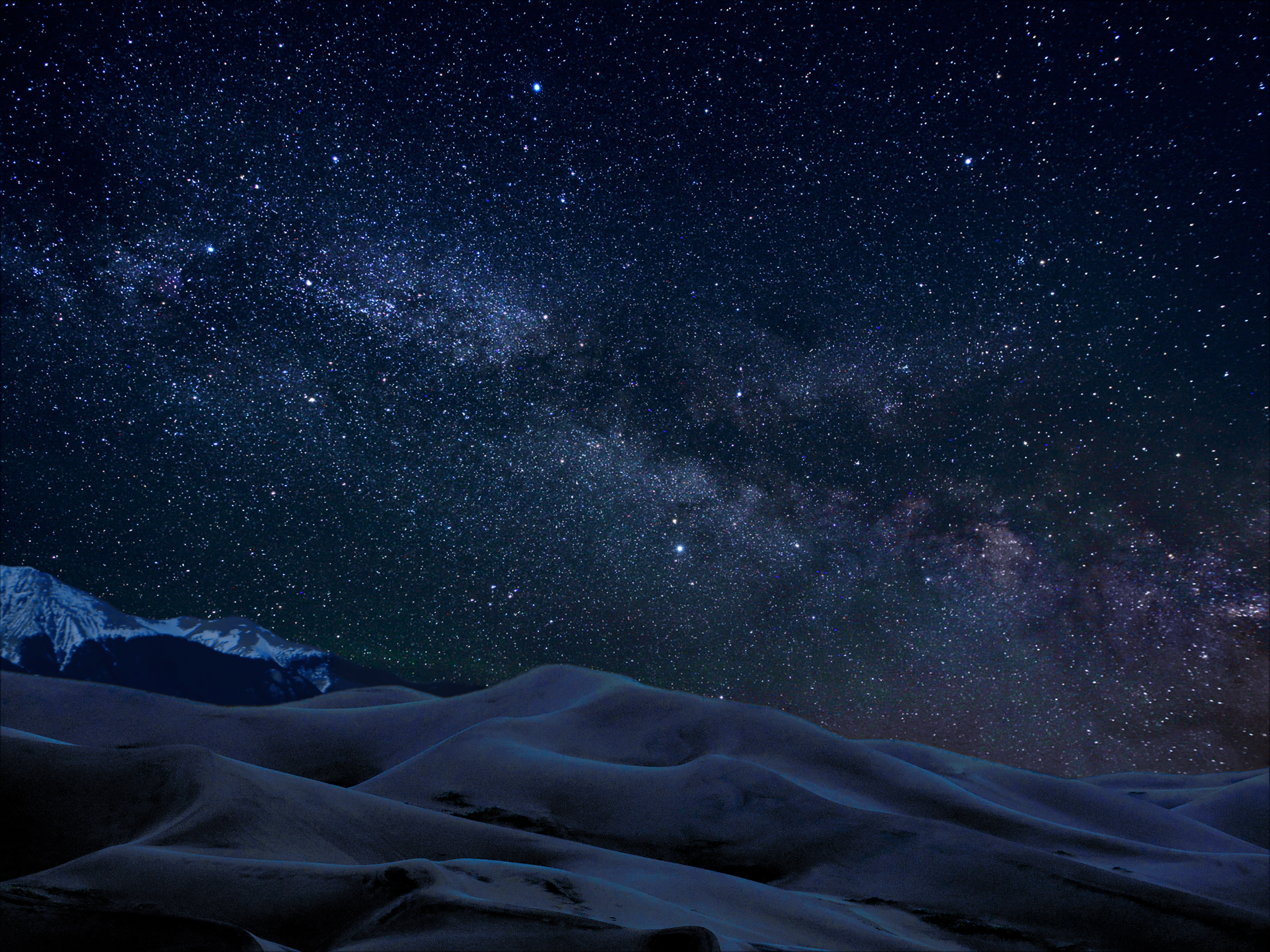
The Milky Way shines above the dunes. Great Sand Dunes is an International Dark Sky Park.

In 2002, the Nature Conservancy purchased the Baca Ranch—an area of 97,000 acres (151.6 sq mi; 392.5 km^{2})—for $31.28 million. Financing was provided by the Department of the Interior, the Colorado State Land Board, and private donors. The Baca Ranch had property located in the valley and the adjacent mountains, ranging in elevation from 7,500 ft (2,286 m) west of the dunes to the 14,165 ft (4,317 m) summit of Kit Carson Peak. The purchase approximately tripled the size of the monument. The ranch was split into three sections: the Sangre de Cristos section east of Crestone became part of the Rio Grande National Forest; the section west of the dunes was designated the Baca National Wildlife Refuge and managed by the Fish and Wildlife Service; the section east of the dunes was transferred first to the Rio Grande National Forest and later redesignated a national preserve in 2004 managed by the National Park Service. The national preserve remains open to regulated seasonal hunting, as it was when designated national forest land, but is protected from logging and mining activities which are generally permitted in national forests.

In 2016, the federal government began negotiations toward purchasing 12,518 acres (19.6 sq mi; 50.7 km^{2}) of the Medano–Zapata Ranch from the Nature Conservancy. The plan is to complete the park, making it fully accessible to the public, by acquiring the final piece of privately held land located within the current park boundaries. The land includes the area presently occupied by the bison herd, as well as adjacent meadows and wetland areas.

In May 2019, the Great Sand Dunes National Park and Preserve was designated an International Dark Sky Park by the International Dark-Sky Association.

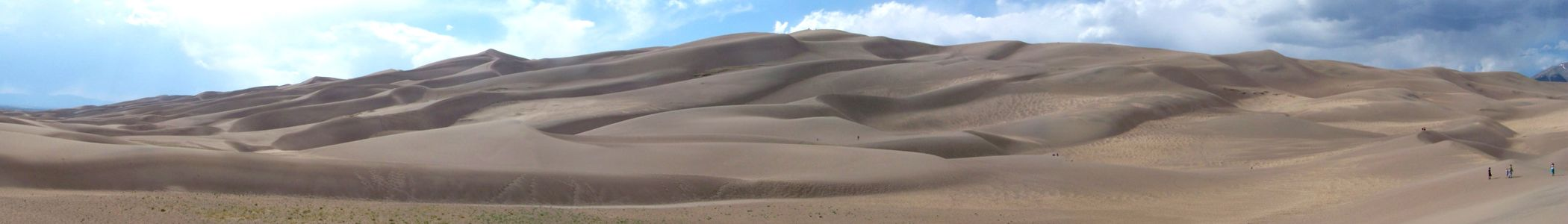
Wide view of the dunes with people at right in foreground

== See also ==
- Baca land grants
- List of national parks of the United States
- List of areas in the United States National Park System
- Alamosa National Wildlife Refuge
- Monte Vista National Wildlife Refuge
- Zapata Falls – located just south of the park
