= San Luis State Park =

Former state park in Colorado, United States

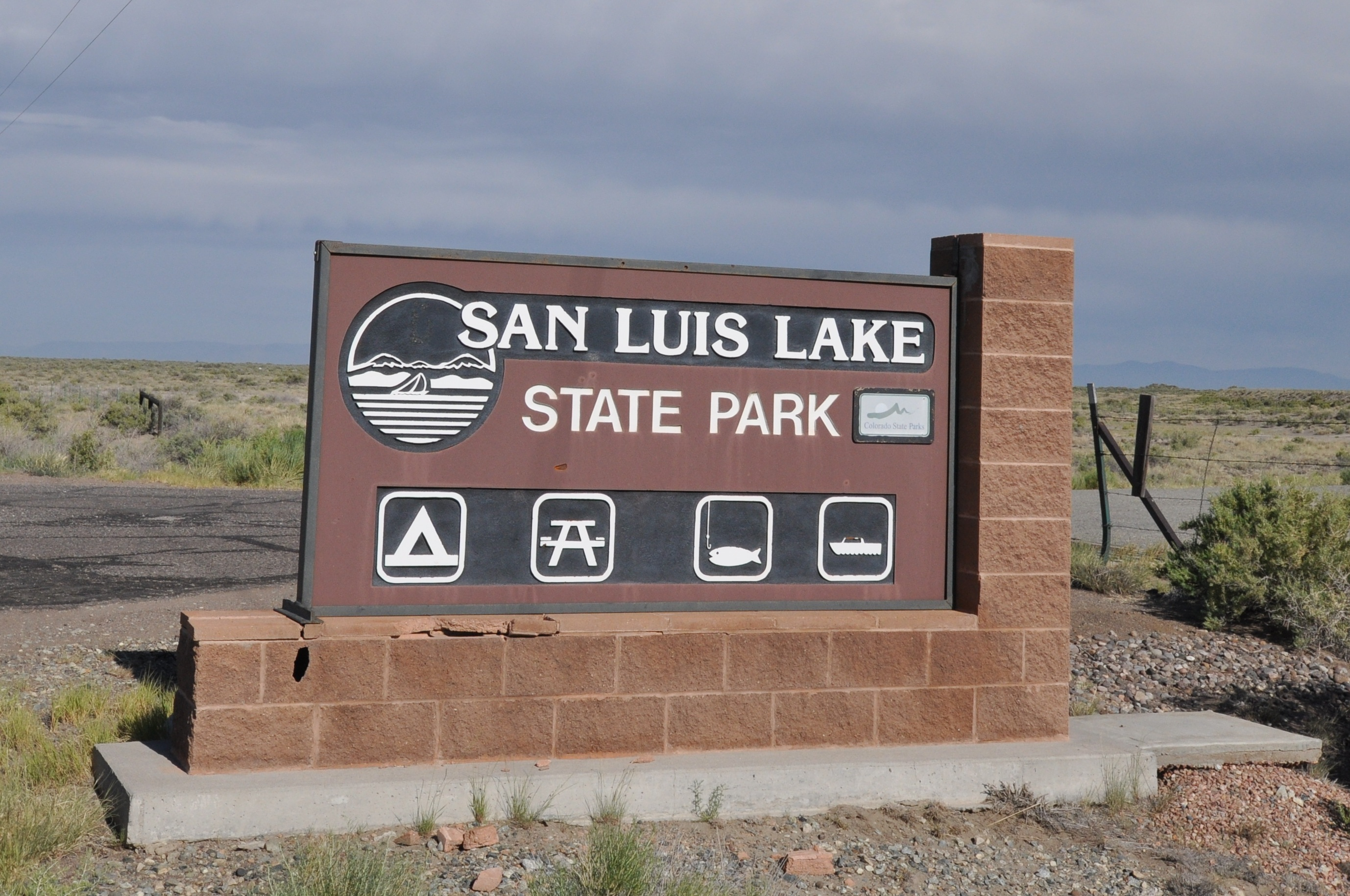

- Location within Colorado
- Location: Alamosa County, Colorado, United States
- Nearest city: Alamosa, CO
- Coordinates: 37°39′59″N 105°44′06″W
- Area: 586 acres (2.37 km^{2})
- Established: 1993
- Governing body: Colorado Parks and Wildlife

San Luis State Park is a former state park located in Alamosa County, Colorado, United States.

In 2017, the property lost its status as a state park, and management of it was transferred to the San Luis Lakes State Wildlife Area.

San Luis Lakes State Wildlife Area is located east of the town of Mosca, south off State Highway 150 near the Great Sand Dunes National Park. The state wildlife area contains an intermittent lake which is sometimes allocated small quantities of water from the hydrologically managed San Luis Closed Basin drainage.

== Wildlife ==
A variety of wildlife makes its home in the area, including coyotes, kangaroo rats, rabbits, elk, various kinds of songbirds, raptors, reptiles and amphibians.
