= Mars Pocket Atlas series =

Mars Atlas

Mars Pocket Atlas is a series of books that contain geographic maps and other information on Mars.

== History ==
The first volume, Mars 36, was published for Mars Year 36, simultaneously in Hungary, the Czech Republic and in the U.K. in 2021.

== Contents ==
The atlas includes albedo (brightness), topographic (relief) information, and layers familiar from terrestrial physical maps, such as valleys (paleorivers), glacial features, dunes and sand sheets, tectonic troughs, volcanic centers; height and depth data, nomenclature and landing site information and weather maps. The series combines these datasets into a visual representation of Mars' surface features. This was enabled by geologic research on Mars in the 2010s. Such geographic atlases (in this case: areographic) do not focus on one theme, but landforms made by all physical geologic processes are visually presented in equal emphasis. The Mars 36 Atlas follows the official MC quadrangle scheme; subsequent editions show map pages centered on geographic features.

=== Thematic feature layers ===
The atlas visualizes various thematic feature layers that were previously only accessible through scientific research papers:

- Impact craters
- Volcanic terrain
- Cave entrances
- Graben, scarps and ridges
- Dune fields
- Outflow channels
- Flood terrain
- Single channels and valley networks
- Deltas
- Paleolakes
- Alluvial fans
- Glacier like forms
- Glacial forms such as Concentric crater fill, lineated valley fill, lobate debris apron
- Polar layered ice

== Books ==
- Mars 36, English-Czech-Hungarian edition
- Mars 36, English edition for UK schools
- Mars 36, Turkish edition for schools in Turkey
- Mars 37, English edition for Kalmbach Media in the USA (Space and Beyond Box, The Mars Collection
- Mars 37 Discoverer, Hungarian language edition combined with activity tasks for young audience.

== See also ==
- Areography (geography of Mars)
