= Mount Herard =

Mountain in Colorado, United States

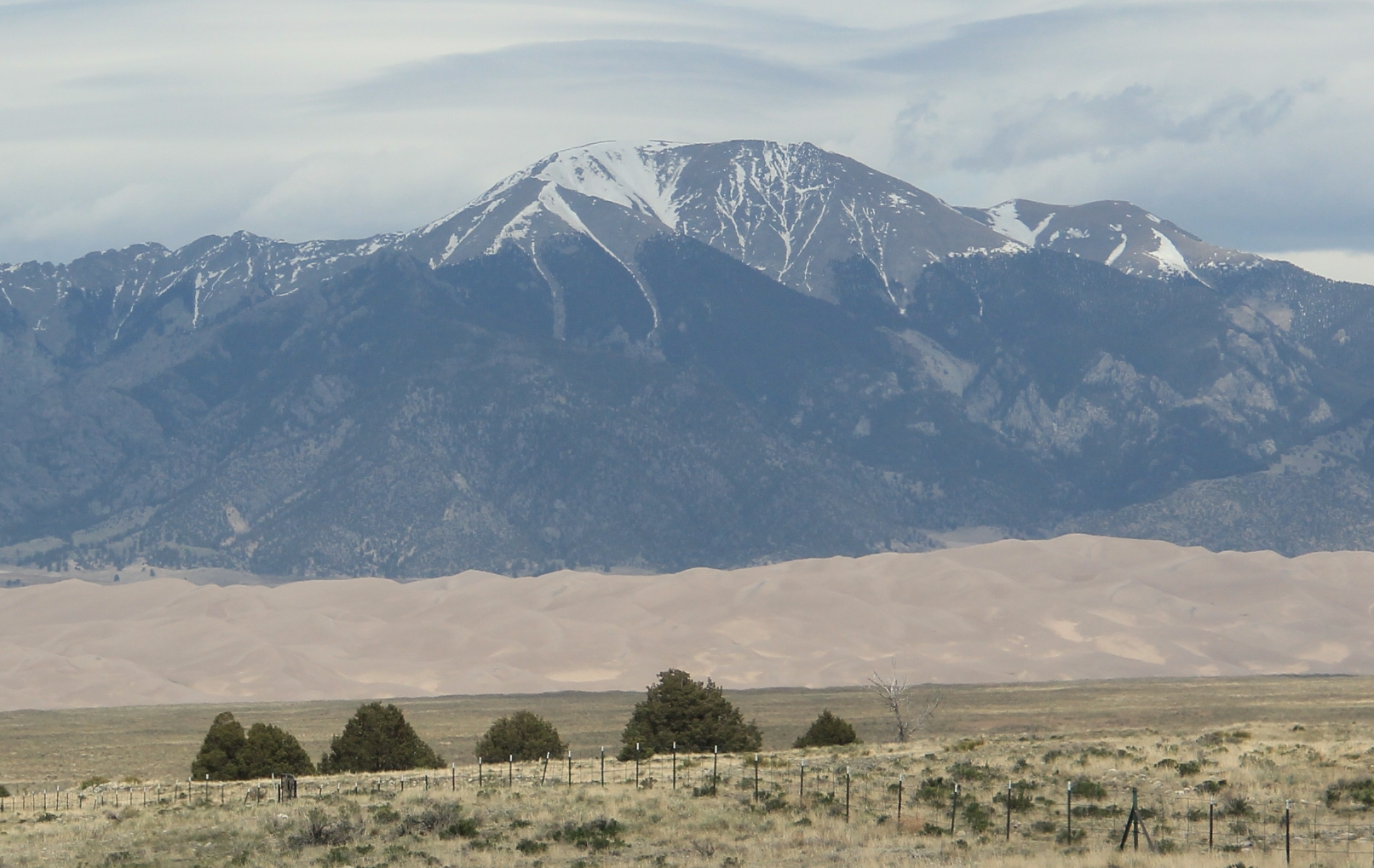
- Mount Herard as seen from the Great Sand Dunes

Highest point
- Elevation: 13,345 ft (4,068 m)
- Prominence: 2,040 ft (622 m)
- Isolation: 4.63 mi (7.45 km)
- Listing: North America highest peaks 101st; US highest major peaks 84th; Colorado highest major peaks 44th
- Coordinates: 37°50′57″N 105°29′40″W

Geography
- Location within Colorado
- Location: Great Sand Dunes National Park and Preserve, Saguache County, Colorado, United States
- Parent range: Sangre de Cristo Range
- Topo map(s): USGS 7.5' topographic map Medano Pass, Colorado

Mount Herard is a high and prominent mountain summit in the Sangre de Cristo Range of the Rocky Mountains of North America. The 13,345-foot (4,068 m) thirteener is located in the Sangre de Cristo Wilderness of Great Sand Dunes National Preserve, 15.0 miles (24.1 km) southeast (bearing 132°) of the Town of Crestone in Saguache County, Colorado, United States.

== Mountain ==
Originally called Medano Peak, the mountain with seven separate summits was renamed Mount Seven at the request of the Colorado Mountain Club in 1970. In 1984 the mountain's name was changed to honor Ulysses Herard who homesteaded on its slopes in 1876.

== Historical names ==
- Herard Peak
- Medano Peak
- Mount Cleveland
- Mount Herard – 1984
- Mount Seven – 1970
- XL Mountain

== See also ==
- List of mountain peaks of North America
  - List of mountain peaks of the United States
    - List of mountain peaks of Colorado
