= Mosca Pass =

Mountain pass in Colorado, USA

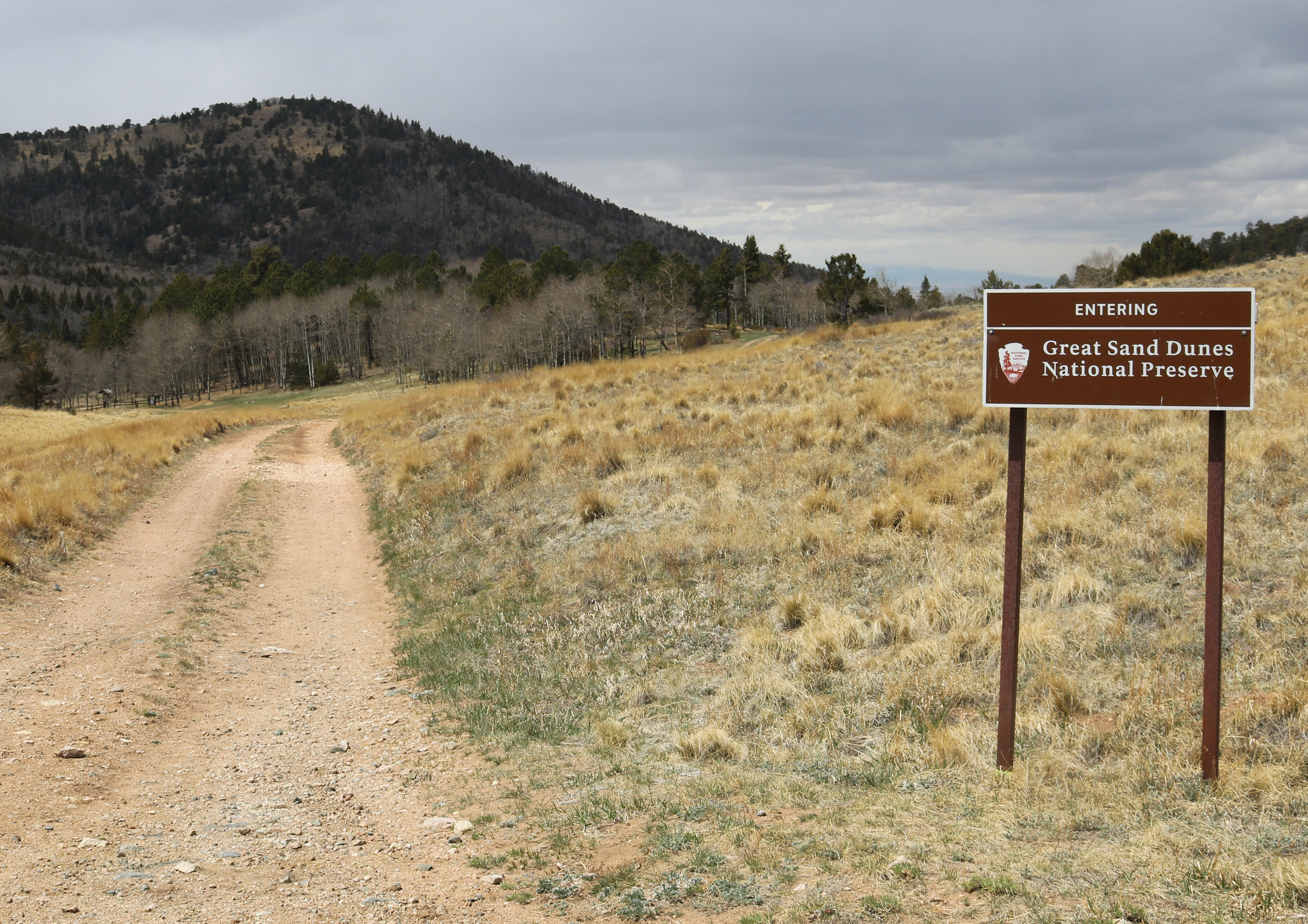
- Looking west from the top of the pass
- Interactive map of Mosca Pass
- Elevation: 9,714 feet (2,961 m)
- Traversed by: trail

Third Approach
- Location: Alamosa / Huerfano counties, Colorado, U.S.
- Range: Sangre de Cristo Range
- Coordinates: 37°43′58″N 105°27′16″W
- Topo map: USGS Mosca Pass

Mosca Pass, elevation 9,714 feet (2,961 meters), is a mountain pass in Alamosa and Huerfano counties in the Sangre de Cristo Range in southern Colorado. The pass lies on the eastern border of the Great Sand Dunes National Park and Preserve about 40 miles west of Walsenburg, Colorado. It marks the boundary between the Great Sand Dunes National Preserve to the west and San Isabel National Forest to the east, and it also lies on the border between Alamosa and Huerfano counties.

Mosca Pass Trail, which starts near the Great Sand Dunes National Park visitor center and is impassable to vehicles, lies on the west side of the pass, and Forest Road 580 begins and heads east from the top of the pass, becoming County Road 580 after passing the national forest boundary. The terrain is a mix of montane meadows, ponderosa pine woodlands, and Douglas-fir forest.

The pass was previously traversed by the former Colorado State Highway 150.

Mosca Pass was named for Luis de Moscoso Alvarado, whose scouting parties may have reached this area about 1542.
