= Amblyderus triplehorni =

Scientific classification
- Kingdom: Animalia
- Phylum: Arthropoda
- Clade: Pancrustacea
- Class: Insecta
- Order: Coleoptera
- Suborder: Polyphaga
- Infraorder: Cucujiformia
- Family: Anthicidae
- Genus: Amblyderus
- Species: A. triplehorni

Binomial name
- Amblyderus triplehorni Weissmann and Kondratieff, 1999

Species of beetle

Amblyderus triplehorni is a species of ant-like flower beetle in the family Anthicidae. It is an endemic species that is only found in the Great Sand Dunes National Monument, Colorado, USA, and in the nearby sand dune habitats in Alamosa and Saguache Counties. This species is also sometimes referred to as Triplehorn's Ant-like Flower Beetle. Amblyderus triplehorni is a small flightless beetle that inhabits barren dunes and is considered critically imperiled in Colorado by NatureServe.

== Description ==
Amblyderus triplehorni is the largest North American Amblyderus species with its length ranging from 4.5 to 6.1 mm. This light yellowish brown beetle varies in colour from yellow to orange-brown, with males typically darker than the females.

It can also have a large brown blotch centered on each elytron occasionally. For the males, generally most of the head, pronotum, and abdomen are dark, with the anterior margins of these parts being lighter coloured. The ventral abdomen is the darkest. The antennae, legs, anterior portion of the head, and ventral region of the prothorax are the lightest coloured. The hairs are white to silvery. For the females, they are a lighter colour overall. Usually the head has a uniform colour and the central thorax is light coloured, which differs from the males.

=== Technical description ===
The head is triangular, wider than it is long. Its eyes are large, black, and oval. The head is light brown anteriorly and dark brown posteriorly. Generally the surface of the head integument is coarsely tuberculate over entire disc with the exception of the median smooth line. The antennae are almost double the length of the head, with the last antennomere conical and pubescent on distal 2/3.

The prothorax is wider than the base of the head, and tapers evenly to base. The width of the prothorax at the base is approximately 2/3 the width of the prothorax apex. Generally, the dorsal integument is darker posteriorly, and lighter anteriorly and ventrally, particularly for the females. The pronotum is tuberculate, with each tubercle anterior to a paired decumbent seta arising from a puncture. The lateral margins of the pronotum have many short and long erect to suberect setae that are visible from the dorsal view. The longest setae is found anteriorly and varies from 0.20-0.28 mm in length.

The shape of the elytra is suboval and almost twice as long as it is wide, and is approximately 1/3 wider than the basal margin of the prothorax. The sides of the elytra are slightly convex and are the widest in the anterior 1/3. It tapers posteriorly gently to a subtruncate to slightly sinuate apex that is medially prolonged posteriorly a little. The disc is somewhat rugose and covered in decumbent short pubescence, with darker integument than the head and prothorax. However, the anterior corners of the elytra are usually a lighter colour.

The legs are a lighter colour than the abdomen and elytra. They are usually pale or yellow. For the males, the anterior tibiae are only slightly sinuate on distal portion and are covered with long pubescence. The tibial spurs are slightly shorter for males than in the females.

The abdomen is dark and covered with dense recumbent hairs. The last 1-1/2 tergites of the abdomen extend past the tip of the elytra.

For the reproductive structures, the tegmen of the aedeagus is elongated, tapering to the apex and rounded distally.

=== Diagnosis ===
Its large size and tapered tegmen of the aedeagus distinguishes this species apart from the other North American Amblyderus.

=== Similar species ===
Some A. triplehorni individuals may be light tan throughout and look visually similar to A. pallens, but A. triplehorni is larger (4.5 – 6.1 mm) than A. pallens (3.1 to 4.2 mm). In addition, the pygidium is not fully exposed dorsally in A. pallens and the anterior margin of the prothorax lacks dense erect hairs in A. pallens.

== Habitat ==
Amblyderus triplehorni is a sand dune specialist, preferring to inhabit the most barren dunes. This species can usually be observed on high bare dune ridges, especially in windswept debris pockets.

== Behaviour ==
Adults are scavengers that feed on dead insects. They forage in the evenings near the dune crest or in debris pockets further down the dunes. Debris pockets trap small dead insects, such as aphids and cicadellids that the adults feed on. When the wind is calm, the adults travel quickly in a circuitous pattern in search of food. When there are strong gusts of wind, they lie flat against the sand to prevent being picked up by the wind. Two feeding methods are known. The first method uses their middle and hind legs to anchor themselves to the ground and their forelegs and palps to manipulate their food. The second method is to feed while on its back and use all six legs to manipulate the food. Occasionally, these beetles hold their food with their mouths and forelegs, and travel erratically. The adults are most active in early summer, but have been detected up to September.

== Etymology ==
Amblyderus triplehorni was named after Charles A. Triplehorn due to his work with W.A. and B.W. Triplehorn that collected the type specimens in 1974 in Great Sand Dunes National Monument.
