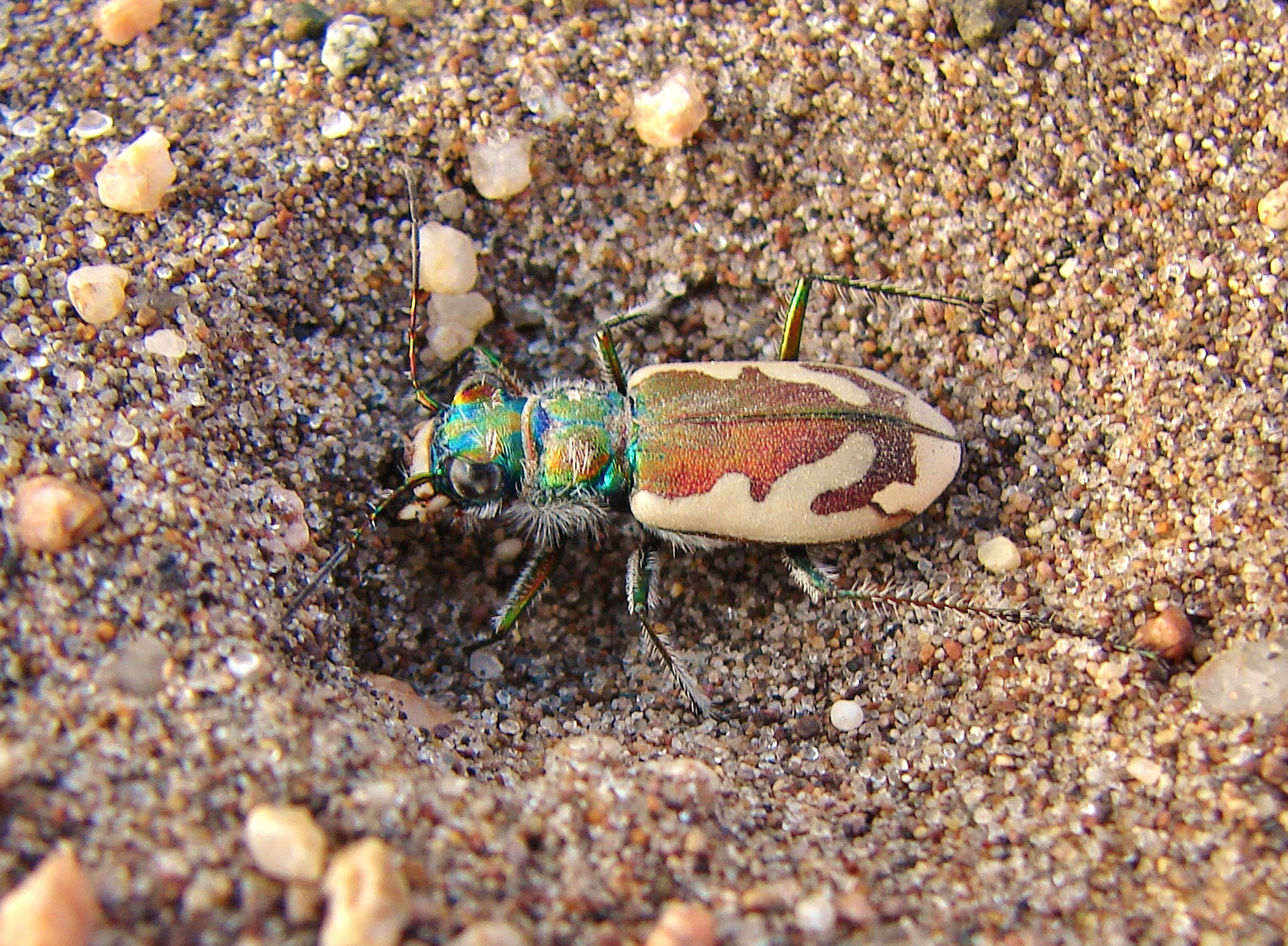
- Great Sand Dunes tiger beetle

Scientific classification
- Kingdom: Animalia
- Phylum: Arthropoda
- Class: Insecta
- Order: Coleoptera
- Suborder: Adephaga
- Family: Cicindelidae
- Genus: Cicindela
- Species: C. theatina

Binomial name
- Cicindela theatina Rotger, 1944

= Cicindela theatina =

Species of beetle

Cicindela theatina, commonly known as the Great Sand Dunes tiger beetle, is a predatory beetle found in sparsely vegetated sandy habitats. The species' range encompasses only about 290 square kilometres (110 sq mi) in the Great Sand Dunes National Park in Colorado. Despite its small range, the species is relatively secure because its entire habitat is within a protected national park.

The adults are about 13 millimetres (0.51 in) long and are readily distinguished by the violin-shaped marking on their backs and their iridescent green-blue heads.

The insects live for approximately 2.5 years, with mating occurring in late May and larvae appearing the next month. The larval stage lasts a little more than a year, with adults emerging the next July.
