= Amblyderus parviceps =

Scientific classification
- Kingdom: Animalia
- Phylum: Arthropoda
- Class: Insecta
- Order: Coleoptera
- Suborder: Polyphaga
- Infraorder: Cucujiformia
- Family: Anthicidae
- Genus: Amblyderus
- Species: A. parviceps

Binomial name
- Amblyderus parviceps Casey, 1895

Synonyms
- Amblyderus gracilentus Casey, 1895

Species of beetle

Amblyderus parviceps is a species of antlike flower beetle in the family Anthicidae. It is found in Central America and North America.
