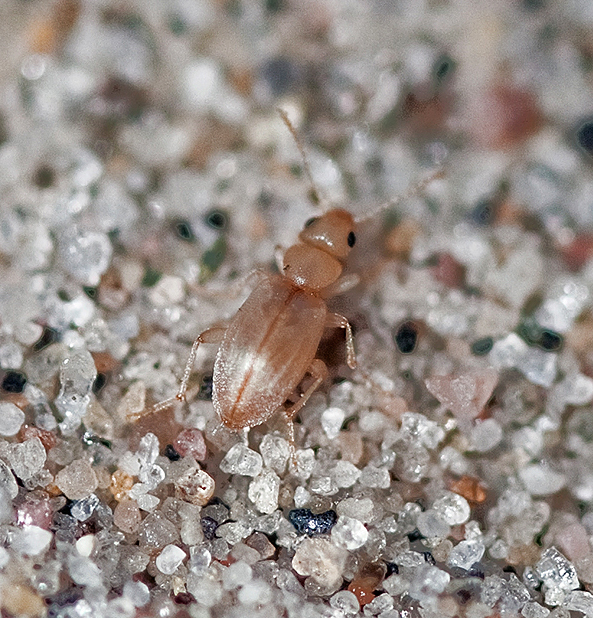
- Amblyderus pallens

Scientific classification
- Kingdom: Animalia
- Phylum: Arthropoda
- Clade: Pancrustacea
- Class: Insecta
- Order: Coleoptera
- Suborder: Polyphaga
- Infraorder: Cucujiformia
- Family: Anthicidae
- Subfamily: Anthicinae
- Genus: Amblyderus; LaFerté-Sénectère, 1849

Synonyms
- Inamblyderus Pic, 1911

= Amblyderus =

Genus of beetles

Amblyderus is a genus of antlike flower beetles in the family Anthicidae. There are about 11 described species in the genus Amblyderus.

== Species ==
These 11 species belong to the genus Amblyderus:

- Amblyderus brunneus Pic, 1893
- Amblyderus granularis (LeConte, 1850)
- Amblyderus mitis van Hille, 1971
- Amblyderus obesus Casey, 1895
- Amblyderus owyhee Chandler, 1999
- Amblyderus pallens (LeConte, 1850)
- Amblyderus parviceps Casey, 1895
- Amblyderus scabricollis (La Ferté-Sénectère, 1847)
- Amblyderus spiniger Motschulsky, 1863
- Amblyderus triplehorni Weismann & Kondratieff, 1999
- Amblyderus werneri Weismann & Kondratieff, 1999
