= Amblyderus granularis =

Scientific classification
- Domain: Eukaryota
- Kingdom: Animalia
- Phylum: Arthropoda
- Class: Insecta
- Order: Coleoptera
- Suborder: Polyphaga
- Infraorder: Cucujiformia
- Family: Anthicidae
- Genus: Amblyderus
- Species: A. granularis

Binomial name
- Amblyderus granularis (LeConte, 1850)

Synonyms
- Amblyderus punctiger Casey, 1895

Species of beetle

Amblyderus granularis is a species of antlike flower beetle in the family Anthicidae. It is found in North America.
