= Colorado State Highway 150 =

State highway in Colorado, United States

State Highway 150
- 150 highlighted in red

Route information
- Maintained by CDOT
- Length: 16.114 mi (25.933 km)

Major junctions
- South end: US 160 west of Blanca
- North end: Great Sand Dunes National Park

Location
- Country: United States
- State: Colorado
- Counties: Alamosa, Costilla

Highway system
- Colorado State Highway System; Interstate; US; State; Scenic
← SH 149	→ SH 151

State Highway 150 (SH 150) is a 16.114 mi-long (25.933 km) long state highway in southern Colorado. SH 150's southern terminus is at U.S. Route 160 (US 160) west of Blanca, and the northern terminus is at Great Sand Dunes National Park.

== Route description ==
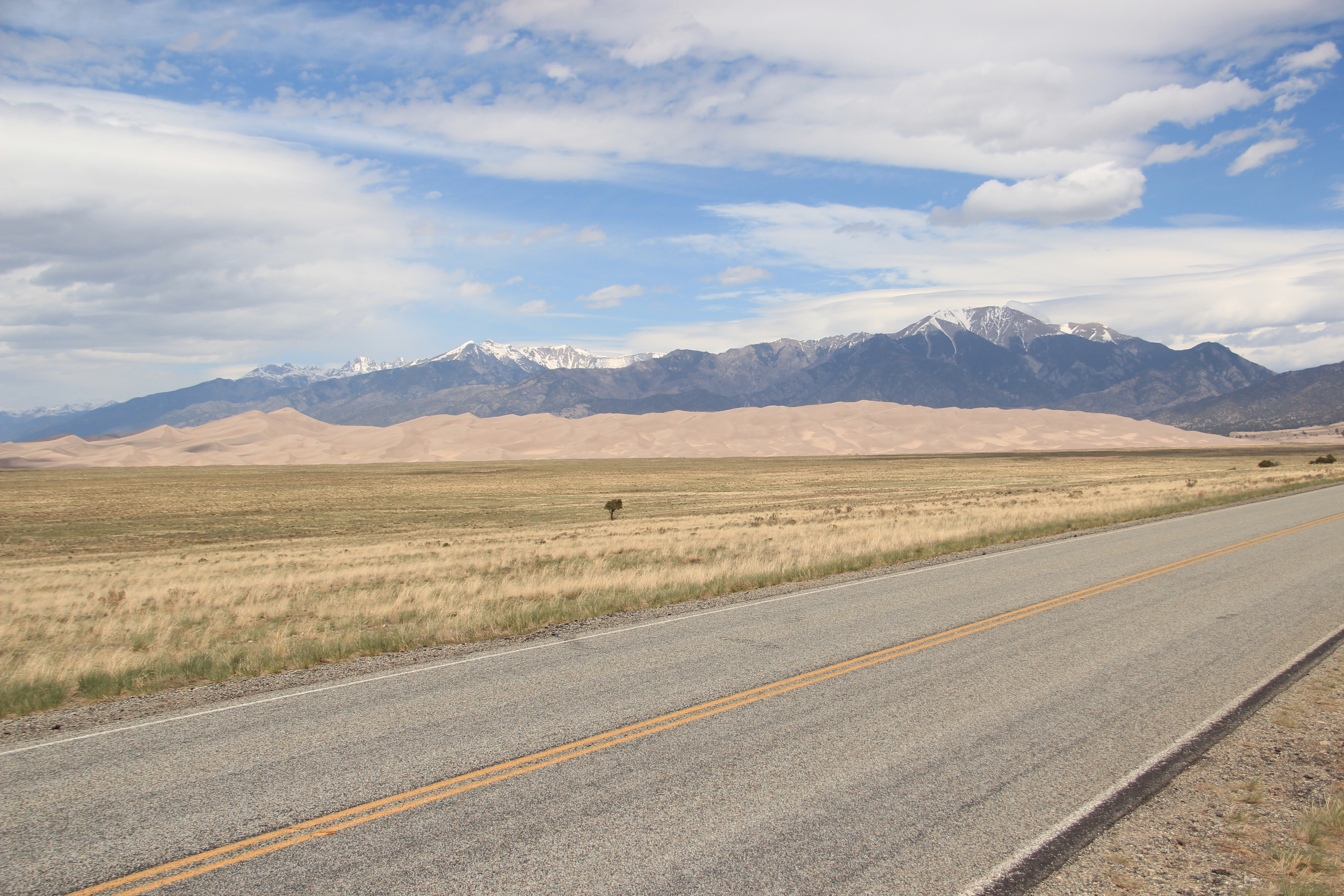
Great Sand Dunes viewed from SH 150

SH 150 begins in the south at its junction with US 160 roughly fifteen miles east of Alamosa and about six miles (10 km) east of Blanca. For much of its length the road heads arrow straight due north across the eastern margin of the broad, flat, nearly featureless San Luis Valley between the Sangre de Christo Mountains in the east and the San Juan Mountains to the west. The road eventually deviates from its due north heading as it approaches its northern endpoint at Great Sand Dunes National Park.

== History ==
The first route to use the number 150 was established in the 1920s, when it connected SH 17 at Mosca to SH 69 at Gardner over Mosca Pass which is no longer maintained for automobile travel. The route was deleted by 1954 and resurrected in 1960, when it connected Mosca with the Great Sand Dunes National Park. This routing was deleted in 1973 and resurrected again to its current routing today the following year.

== Major intersections ==
County	Location	mi	km	Destinations	Notes
Costilla		0.000	0.000	US 160 – Walsenburg, Alamosa	Southern terminus
Alamosa		16.114	25.933	Great Sand Dunes National Park	Northern terminus; road continues into Great Sand Dunes NP
1.000 mi = 1.609 km; 1.000 km = 0.621 mi
