= Scurfpea =

A scurfpea is a legume that may belong to any of several genera of plants, including:

- Cullen
- Hoita
- Pediomelum
- Psoralea
- Rupertia
