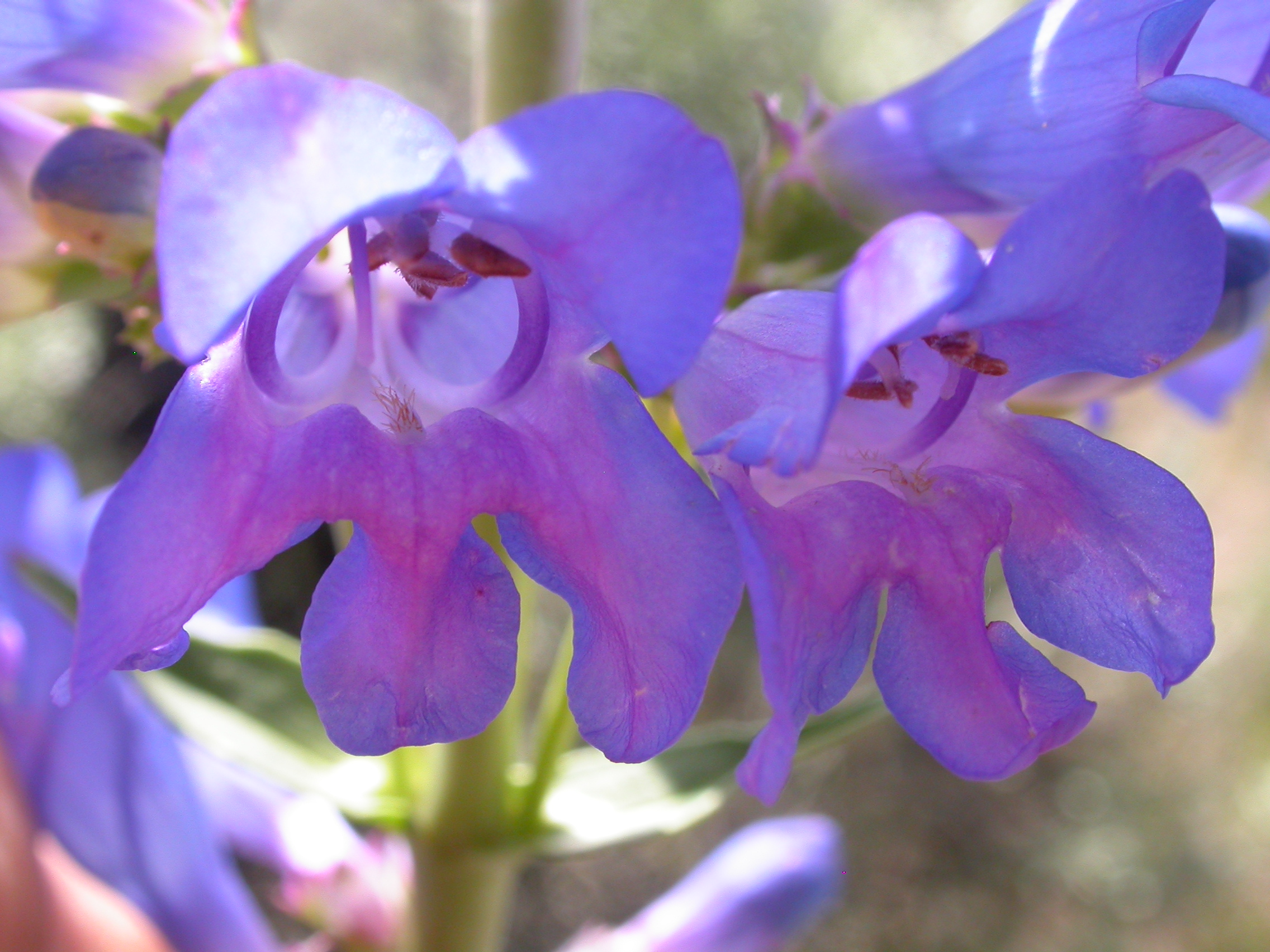

Conservation status
- Secure (NatureServe)

Scientific classification
- Kingdom: Plantae
- Clade: Tracheophytes
- Clade: Angiosperms
- Clade: Eudicots
- Clade: Asterids
- Order: Lamiales
- Family: Plantaginaceae
- Genus: Penstemon
- Species: P. cyaneus

Binomial name
- Penstemon cyaneus Pennell

= Penstemon cyaneus =

Plant species in the plantain family

Penstemon cyaneus is a species of flowering plant in the plantain family known by the common names blue penstemon and dark blue penstemon. It is native to the western United States, where it is widespread in Idaho and also found in parts of Montana and Wyoming.

== Description ==
Penstemon cyaneus is a Perennial plant with stems that grow straight upwards (erect) or grow outwards and then curve to grow upright. They are usually 30 to 80 centimeters tall, but occasionally will be just 17 cm when full grown. Stems are hairless and may be somewhat glaucous, coated in natural waxes. The stems and leaves sprout from a branched and woody caudex.

Plants have both basal and cauline leaves, those that sprout from the base of the plant and attached to the stems. Dark blue penstemons always have hairless leaves, but they vary in being leathery or glaucous. The leaves lowest on the stems and the basal leaves are 5 to 17 centimeters in length, but just 0.8 to 3.5 cm in width and usually less than 2.5 cm. Their shape ranges from oblanceolate to elliptic with tapering bases. Lower leaves are petiolate, attached to the plant by leaf stems, while upper ones have short petioles or attach directly to the stem. Stems will have three to seven pairs of stems with the uppermost sometimes clasping the stem.

The flowers are blue, sometimes with a pinkish tinge. The flowers may be as much as 34 millimeters long, but more often are 24–30 mm in length with a diameter of 8–11 mm. They are attractive to bees.

== Taxonomy ==
The botanist Francis W. Pennell published the scientific description and name of Penstemon cyaneus in 1920. It has no synonyms or varieties.

=== Names ===
The scientific name, cyaneus, means blue. Similarly, in English it is known by the common name blue penstemon or dark blue penstemon. It may also be called dark blue beardtongue.

== Range and habitat ==
Penstemon cyaneus grows in three states near and in the Rocky Mountains. It is most widespread in Idaho where it grows from Idaho County southward. In Montana it grows in just a southwestern area near Yellowstone National Park. In Wyoming it can be found in the northwest quadrant of the state.

This plant grows on high plains and in sagebrush steppes in open areas.

=== Conservation ===
In 1992 dark blue penstemon was evaluated by NatureServe and found to be secure (G5). At the state level they rated it as vulnerable (S3) in Wyoming and have not evaluated it at the state level in the rest of its range.

This species may be used in revegetation projects in wildlife habitat. It is also appropriate for landscaping in dry areas such as roadsides. It may be difficult to use because it is vulnerable to root rot infections.

== See also ==
- List of Penstemon species
