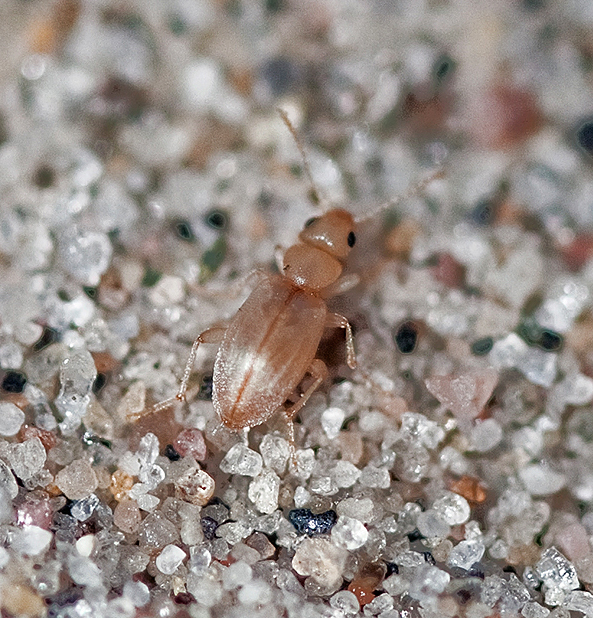

Scientific classification
- Kingdom: Animalia
- Phylum: Arthropoda
- Class: Insecta
- Order: Coleoptera
- Suborder: Polyphaga
- Infraorder: Cucujiformia
- Family: Anthicidae
- Genus: Amblyderus
- Species: A. pallens

Binomial name
- Amblyderus pallens (LeConte, 1850)

Synonyms
- Anthicus pallens LeConte, 1850; Amblyderus pallens Casey, 1895; Amblyderus arenarius Casey, 1895

= Amblyderus pallens =

Species of beetle

Amblyderus pallens, also known as the pale ant-like flower beetle, is a species of antlike flower beetle in the family Anthicidae. It is found in North America. Amblyderus pallens is a small flightless beetle that inhabits the dunes across the United States and southern Canada with the exception of western North America. NatureServe considers the species critically imperiled (SI) in Saskatchewan and Manitoba, Canada.

== Description ==
Their body length ranges from 3.1 to 4.2 mm and their colour varies from yellow to light yellow and brown. Their back (dorsum) is lightly reticulated, though sometimes the head is smooth. This species has appressed body setae (hair), that is dense on their elytra. Lastly, A. pallens has reduced flight wings.

== Habitat and distribution ==
Amblyderus pallens live in dune and sandy beach habitats. The adults are found in the sand hiding under plants and debris like beach drift and also among grass roots up to 4–8 cm under the surface. They are usually found between May and August, but can also be active from November to February.

In Canada, they have been recorded in Alberta, Saskatchewan, Manitoba, Ontario, Quebec, and News Brunswick. More recently, they have been discovered in Nova Scotia and Prince Edward Island. In the United States, they have been recorded in Arizona, Colorado, Florida, Georgia, Illinois, Indiana, Louisiana, Maine, Massachusetts, Michigan, Mississippi, Missouri, Nebraska, New Hampshire, New Jersey, New Mexico, New York, North Carolina, Oklahoma, South Carolina, South Dakota, Texas, Virginia, and Wisconsin.
