= Sand sheet =

Plots of sand

Sand sheets are flat, gently undulating plots of sand surfaced by grains that may be too large for saltation. They form approximately 40 percent of aeolian depositional surfaces.

Sand sheets exist where grain size is too large, or wind velocities too low, for dunes to form.
