= Inodesmus aenigmaticus =

Scientific classification
- Kingdom: Animalia
- Phylum: Arthropoda
- Subphylum: Myriapoda
- Class: Diplopoda
- Order: Polydesmida
- Infraorder: Polydesmoides
- Superfamily: Haplodesmoidea
- Family: Haplodesmidae
- Genus: Inodesmus
- Species: I. aenigmaticus

Binomial name
- Inodesmus aenigmaticus (Mesibov, 2013)

Species of millipede

Holotype site (QM S96017 ♂): Mt Hayward, QLD'"`UNIQ--ref-00000006-QINU`"'

Inodesmus aenigmaticus is a species of millipede in the family Haplodesmidae, and was first described in 2013 by Robert Mesibov. It is known only from Mount Hayward, and possibly Mount Bellenden Ker in Queensland, Australia.
