= Macratria durrelli =

Scientific classification
- Kingdom: Animalia
- Phylum: Arthropoda
- Clade: Pancrustacea
- Class: Insecta
- Order: Coleoptera
- Suborder: Polyphaga
- Infraorder: Cucujiformia
- Family: Anthicidae
- Genus: Macratria
- Species: M. durrelli

Binomial name
- Macratria durrelli Telnov, 2025

Species of beetle

Macratria durrelli is a species of antlike flower beetle in the family Anthicidae. It is found in Madagascar. It was named after Gerald Durrell.
