= Macratria pseudodensata =

Scientific classification
- Kingdom: Animalia
- Phylum: Arthropoda
- Clade: Pancrustacea
- Class: Insecta
- Order: Coleoptera
- Suborder: Polyphaga
- Infraorder: Cucujiformia
- Family: Anthicidae
- Genus: Macratria
- Species: M. pseudodensata

Binomial name
- Macratria pseudodensata Telnov, 2012

Species of beetle

Macratria pseudodensata is a species of antlike flower beetle in the family Anthicidae. It is found in New Guinea.
