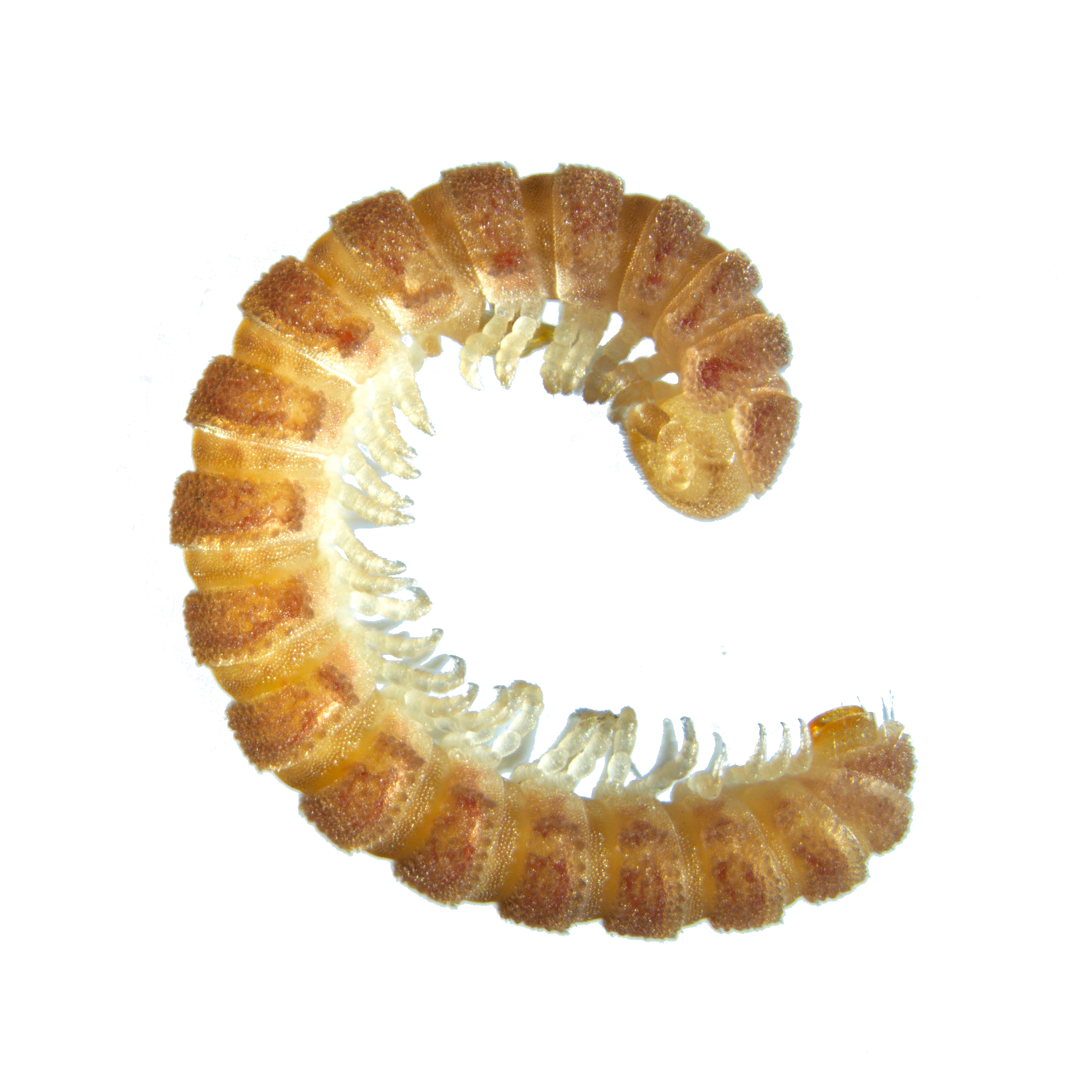

Scientific classification
- Kingdom: Animalia
- Phylum: Arthropoda
- Subphylum: Myriapoda
- Class: Diplopoda
- Order: Polydesmida
- Family: Haplodesmidae
- Genus: Inodesmus
- Species: I. urbanus

Binomial name
- Inodesmus urbanus (Romero-Rincon & Douch, 2024)

= Inodesmus urbanus =

Species of millipede

Inodesmus urbanus is a species of millipede in the family Haplodesmidae. It was described by Juan Romero-Rincon and James K. Douch in 2024 as Agathodesmus urbanus, before being combined into the genus Inodesmus later that year. The specific epithet refers to its urban distribution. It is found in Sydney, Australia, with the type locality being Meadowbank Reserve.
