= Inodesmus adelphus =

Scientific classification
- Kingdom: Animalia
- Phylum: Arthropoda
- Subphylum: Myriapoda
- Class: Diplopoda
- Order: Polydesmida
- Infraorder: Polydesmoides
- Superfamily: Haplodesmoidea
- Family: Haplodesmidae
- Genus: Inodesmus
- Species: I. adelphus

Binomial name
- Inodesmus adelphus (Mesibov, 2013)

Species of millipede

Holotype site (QM S96015): Mt Bartle Frere, QLD'"`UNIQ--ref-00000006-QINU`"'

Inodesmus adelphus is a species of millipede in the family Haplodesmidae, and was first described in 2013 by Robert Mesibov. It is known only from its type locality.
