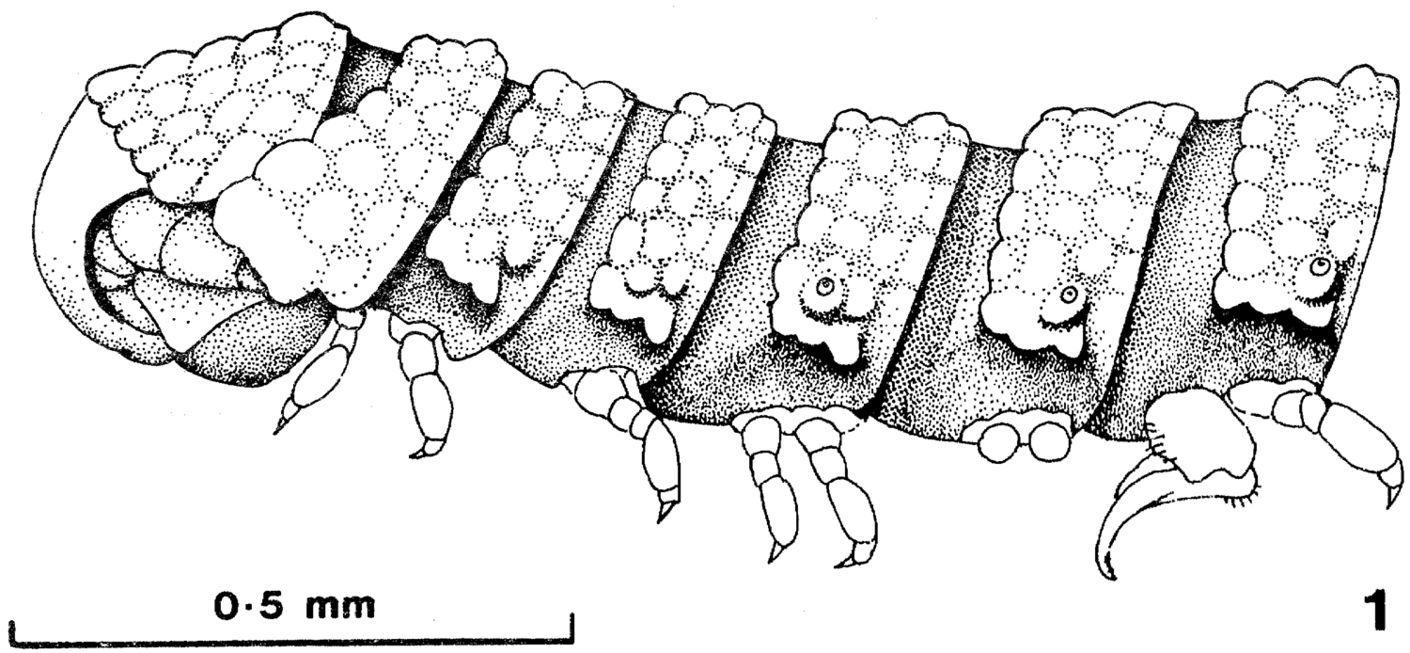
- Prosopodesmus panporus

Scientific classification
- Kingdom: Animalia
- Phylum: Arthropoda
- Subphylum: Myriapoda
- Class: Diplopoda
- Order: Polydesmida
- Family: Haplodesmidae
- Genus: Prosopodesmus; Silvestri, 1910

Type species
- Prosopodesmus jacobsoni Silvestri, 1910

Synonyms
- Homodesmus Chamberlin, 1918; Rhipidopeltis Miyosi, 1958

= Prosopodesmus =

Genus of millipedes

Prosopodesmus is a genus of flat-backed millipedes in the family Haplodesmidae. These millipedes are found primarily in Australia and southern Japan. This genus includes the species P. panporus, which is notable for exhibiting sexual dimorphism in segment number: Whereas adult females of this species feature the usual 20 segments (counting the collum as the first segment and the telson as the last) usually observed in the order Polydesmida, the adult males of this species feature only 19 segments.

== Discovery and distribution ==
This genus was created by the Italian zoologist Filippo Silvestri in 1910 to contain the newly discovered type species P. jacobsoni. Although Silvestri based the original description of this species on type material collected from Java, this species has since proven to be a pantropical synanthrope, found in Louisiana, Florida, Puerto Rico, Haiti, Panama, Brazil, India, Taiwan, and Fiji, among other places. In 1920, the French myriapodologist Henri W. Brölemann originally described P. hilaris as a subspecies of P. jacobsoni found in Zanzibar, but some authorities now regard this millipede to be a separate species.

In 1980, the British myriapodologist John Gordon Blower and Adrian J. Rundle described another species in the same genus, P. panporus. They based the original description of this species on several specimens collected from the hothouses for tropical plants in the Kew Gardens in England. The geographic origin of this species remained a mystery until 2012, when the zoologist Robert Mesibov reported the discovery of P. panporus specimens collected in 1986 from a remote tropical rainforest in the Cape York peninsula of Queensland in Australia, which authorities now consider likely to be the native range of this species.

In 2009, authorities deemed the genus Rhipidopeltis to be a junior synonym of Prosopodesmus. This synonymy moved two more species to the genus Prospodesmus, both found in Japan: The species P. sinuatus was first described by the Japanese myriapodologist Yasunori Miyosi in 1958 and is found in southern Honshu, whereas the species P. similis was first described by A. Haga in 1968 and is found in Kyushu.

Finally, in 2012, Mesibov described three new Prosopodesmus species, all found in the Wet Tropics of north Queensland in Australia. The species P. crater is found in the rainforest in the Atherton Tableland southwest of Cairns in Queensland. The species P. kirrama is found in the rainforest in the mountains northwest of Ingham and southwest of Tully in Queensland. The species P. monteithi is found in the rainforest from Daintree National Park west of Cape Tribulation to the Malbon Thompson range on the coast southeast of Cairns in Queensland.

== Description ==
Adults in this genus feature 20 segments (including the telson), except for adult males of the species P. panporus, which have only 19 segments. The species in this genus range in size from P. panporus, which reaches a maximum length of only 4.3 mm and is one of the smallest millipedes known, to P. monteithi, which reaches a maximum length of 15 mm and is the largest known species in the genus Prosopodesmus. These millipedes are not capable of volvation. The paranota are well developed and sloping, and the tergites feature three transverse rows of tubercles. The gonopods are shaped like hooks and are fairly simple, with no separate solenomere branch.

== Species ==
This genus includes eight species:

- Prosopodesmus crater Mesibov, 2012
- Prosopodesmus hilaris Brölemann, 1920
- Prosopodesmus jacobsoni Silvestri, 1910
- Prosopodesmus kirrama Mesibov, 2012
- Prosopodesmus monteithi Mesibov, 2012
- Prosopodesmus panporus Blower & Rundle, 1980
- Prosopodesmus similis (Haga, 1968)
- Prosopodesmus sinuatus (Miyosi, 1958)
