= Doratodesmus =

Scientific classification
- Kingdom: Animalia
- Phylum: Arthropoda
- Subphylum: Myriapoda
- Class: Diplopoda
- Order: Polydesmida
- Family: Haplodesmidae
- Genus: Doratodesmus; Cook, 1895

Type species
- Doratodesmus armatus (Pocock, 1894)

Synonyms
- Crenatidorsus Zhang, 1993; Doratonotus Pocock, 1894; Eucondylodesmus Miyosi, 1956; Hoplitesmus Chamberlin, 1945; Pauroplus Chamberlin, 1945; Scolopopyge Hoffman, 1978; Selminarchus Hoffman, 1978

Genus of millipedes

Doratodesmus is a genus of flat-backed millipedes in the family Haplodesmidae. These millipedes are found in China, Indonesia, and Papua New Guinea. This genus includes two species that are notable for including adult males with only 18 segments (counting the collum as the first and the telson as the last) rather than the 20 segments normally observed in the order Polydesmida: D. hispidus features only 18 segments in adults of each sex, whereas D. pholeter exhibits sexual dimorphism in segment number, with 19 segments in adult females but only 18 segments in adult males.

== Discovery, taxonomy, and distribution ==
The American biologist Orator F. Cook proposed the name Doratodesmus in 1895 for two species previously described under the name Doratonotus, which was already occupied. In 1894, the British zoologist Reginald I. Pocock described the type species Doratonotus armatus as a new species discovered on the island of Java in Indonesia. In 1895, the Italian zoologist Filippo Silvestri described Doratonotus beccarii as a new species discovered on the island of Sumatra in Indonesia. After moving both of these species to the genus Doratodesmus, Cook described two more species in this genus in 1896, D. muralis and D. vestitus, both discovered on the island of Java. In 1945, the American biologist Ralph V. Chamberlin described Hoplitesmus as a new monotypic genus and Hoplitesmus enoplus as a new species discovered on the island of Java. In 1955, however, the Dutch myriapodologist C.A.W. Jeekel deemed H. enoplus to be a junior synonym of Doratodesmus armatus.

In 1945, Chamberlin also described Pauroplus as a new monotypic genus with Pauroplus analdes as its type species discovered on the island of Sumatra. In 1978, the American zoologist Richard L. Hoffman described Scolopopyge and Selminarchus as new monotypic genera with Scolopopyge pholeter and Selminarchus hispidus as their respective type species, both discovered in Papua New Guinea. In 1993, Zhang Chunzhou described Crenatidorsus as a new monotypic genus with Crenatidorsus grandifoliatus as its type species discovered in Yunnan province in China. In 2009, however, authorities deemed Pauroplus, Scolopopyge, Selminarchus, and Crenatidorsus to be junior synonyms of Doratodesmus. These genera had been placed in the family Doratodesmidae, which authorities deemed in 2009 to be a junior synonym of Haplodesmidae. Although the monotypic genus Eucondylodesmus was also deemed to be a junior synonym of Doratodesmus in 2009, authorities reconsidered in 2010 and deemed Eucondylodesmus to be a junior synonym of Eutrichodesmus instead.

== Description ==
The millipedes in the genus Doratodesmus are capable of complete volvation. The coxae (basal elements) of the gonopods in adult males usually feature abundant setae. The gonopod telopodites (distal elements) are usually stout and markedly enlarged toward the sides.

The millipedes in this genus resemble those in the genus Eutrichodesmus, which are also usually capable of complete volvation. Like the adult males in Doratodesmus, those in Eutrichodesmus also usually feature gonopod coxae with abundant setae. The adult males in Eutrichodesmus, however, feature gonopod telopodites that are usually slender and not enlarged, unlike those usually observed in Doratodesmus.

== Species ==
This genus includes the following eight species:

- Doratodesmus analdes (Chamberlin, 1945)
- Doratodesmus armatus (Pocock, 1894)
- Doratodesmus beccarii (Silvestri, 1895)
- Doratodesmus grandifoliatus (Zhang, 1993)
- Doratodesmus hispidus (Hoffman, 1978)
- Doratodesmus muralis Cook, 1896
- Doratodesmus pholeter (Hoffman, 1978)
- Doratodesmus vestitus Cook, 1896
