= Macratria brunnea =

Scientific classification
- Kingdom: Animalia
- Phylum: Arthropoda
- Class: Insecta
- Order: Coleoptera
- Suborder: Polyphaga
- Infraorder: Cucujiformia
- Family: Anthicidae
- Genus: Macratria
- Species: M. brunnea

Binomial name
- Macratria brunnea Casey, 1895

Species of beetle

Macratria brunnea is a species of antlike flower beetle in the family Anthicidae. It is found in Central America and North America.
