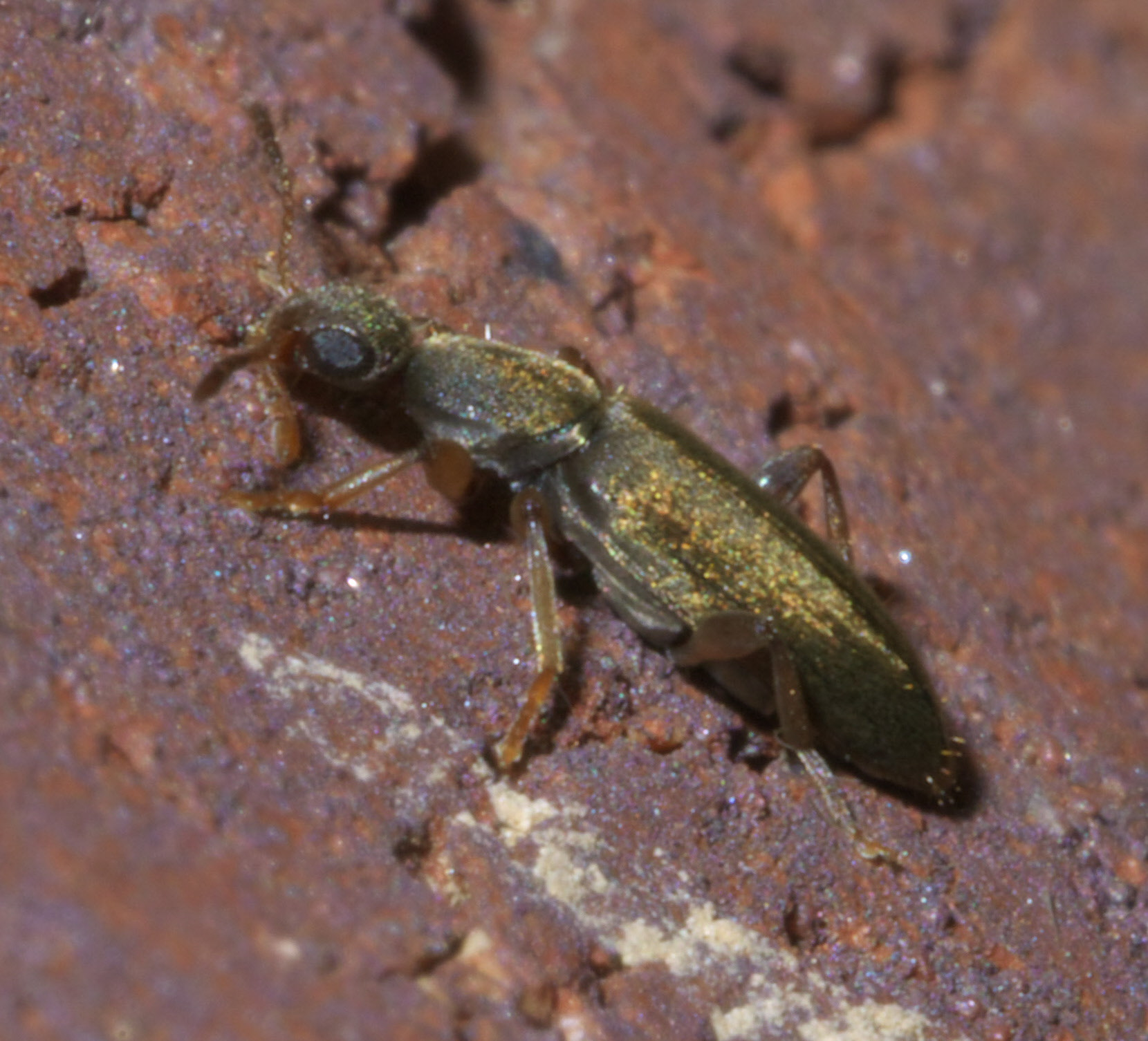

Scientific classification
- Domain: Eukaryota
- Kingdom: Animalia
- Phylum: Arthropoda
- Class: Insecta
- Order: Coleoptera
- Suborder: Polyphaga
- Infraorder: Cucujiformia
- Family: Anthicidae
- Genus: Macratria
- Species: M. murina

Binomial name
- Macratria murina (Fabricius, 1801)

Synonyms
- Macratria linearis Newman, 1838

= Macratria murina =

Species of beetle

Macratria murina is a species of antlike flower beetle in the family Anthicidae. It is found in North America.

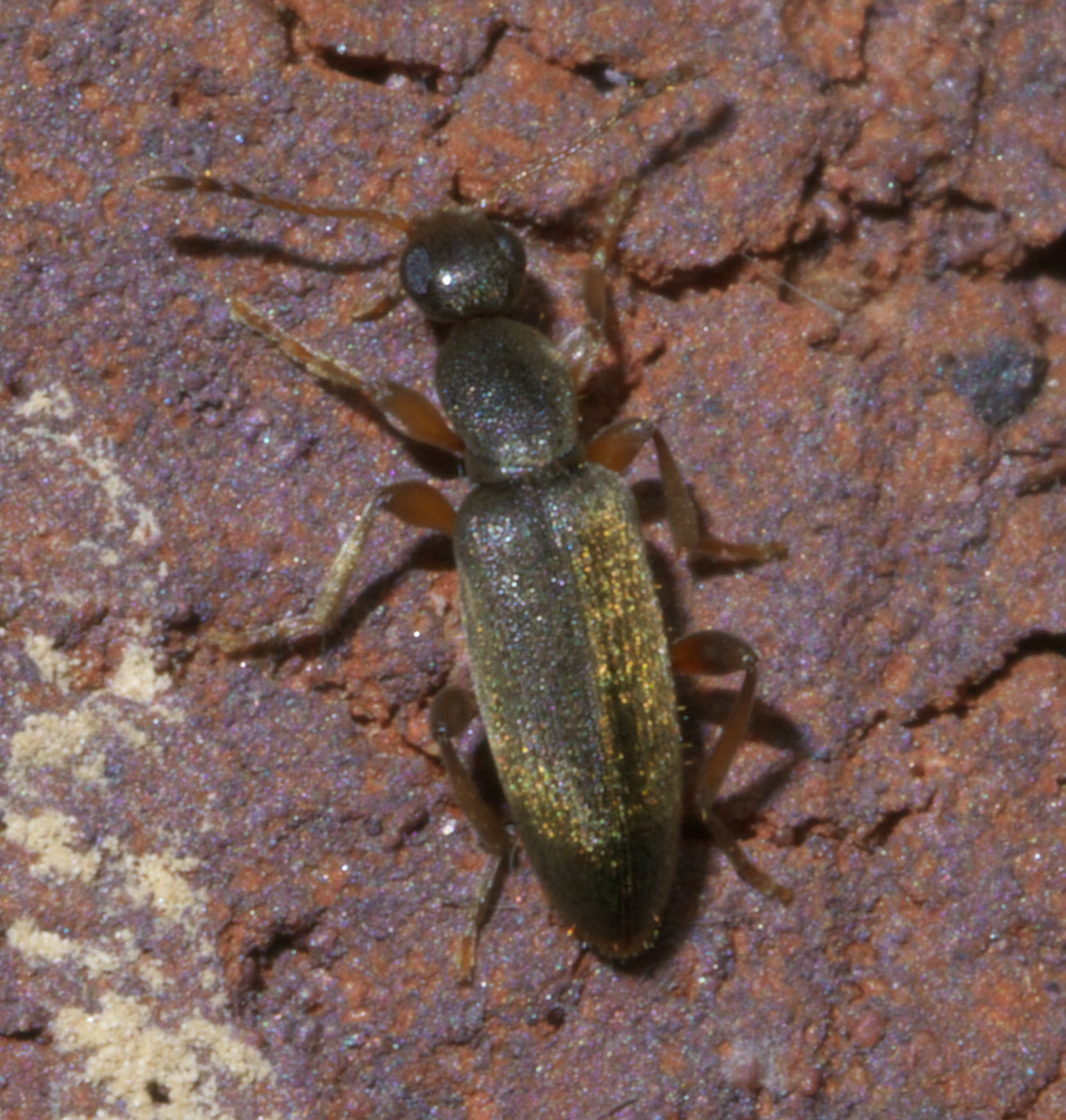
