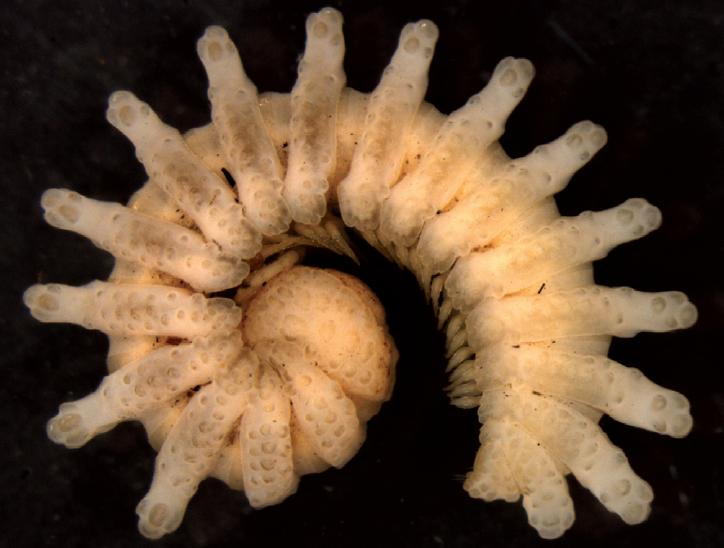
- Eutrichodesmus aster

Scientific classification
- Kingdom: Animalia
- Phylum: Arthropoda
- Subphylum: Myriapoda
- Class: Diplopoda
- Order: Polydesmida
- Family: Haplodesmidae
- Subfamily: Haplodesminae
- Genus: Eutrichodesmus; Silvestri, 1910

Synonyms
- Eutrichodesmus Silvestri, 1910; Dimorphodesmus Murakami, 1966; Ascetophacus Hoffman, 1977; Cerastelachys Hoffman, 1977; Dyomerothrix Hoffman, 1982; Parapauroplus Zhang in Zhang & Wang, 1993; Pocillidorsus Zhang in Zhang & Wang, 1993

= Eutrichodesmus =

Genus of millipedes

Eutrichodesmus is a genus of millipedes in the family Haplodesmidae. Containing 54 species, this genus is among the genera with the greatest number of species not only in the family Haplodesmidae but also in the order Polydesmida. This genus includes the species E. peculiaris, notable for featuring sexual dimorphism in segment number: The adult females have 20 segments (counting the collum as the first segment and the telson as the last), but the adult males have only 19 segments. Millipedes in this genus are found in southern Japan, Taiwan, southern China, mainland Southeast Asia, Indonesia, and Vanuatu.

== Description ==
Millipedes in this genus are small, ranging from 3.5 mm to 14 mm in length. These millipedes can have 19 or 20 segments. Species in this genus are capable of volvation, which is usually complete but sometimes incomplete.

The basal element of the gonopod (coxa) in adult males in this genus usually features abundant setae. The distal element of the gonopod (telopodite) is usually slender and long, with dense setae on the basal half. The telopodite often features a conspicuous outgrowth on the lateral side. The distal part of the telopodite is conspicuous and well developed but rarely branches into a separate lobe.

The millipedes in this genus resemble those in the genus Doratodesmus, which are also capable of volvation. Like the adult males in Eutrichodesmus, those in Doratodesmus also usually feature gonopod coxae with abundant setae. The adult males in Doratodesmus, however, feature gonopod telopodites that are usually stout and markedly enlarged toward the sides, unlike those usually observed in Eutrichodesmus, which are slender.

== Species ==
This genus includes the following species:

- Eutrichodesmus arcicollaris Zhang, 1993
- Eutrichodesmus armatocaudatus Golovatch, Geoffroy, Mauriès & VandenSpiegel, 2009
- Eutrichodesmus aster Golovatch, Geoffroy, Mauriès & VandenSpiegel, 2009
- Eutrichodesmus asteroides Golovatch, Geoffroy, Mauriès & VandenSpiegel, 2009
- Eutrichodesmus basalis Golovatch, Geoffroy, Mauriès & VandenSpiegel, 2009
- Eutrichodesmus cavernicola Sinclair, 1901
- Eutrichodesmus communicans Golovatch, Geoffroy, Mauriès & VandenSpiegel, 2009
- Eutrichodesmus curticornis Golovatch, Geoffroy, Mauriès & VandenSpiegel, 2009
- Eutrichodesmus demangei Silvestri, 1910
- Eutrichodesmus deporatus Liu, Golovatch & Wesener, 2017
- Eutrichodesmus distinctus Golovatch, Geoffroy, Mauriès & VandenSpiegel, 2009
- Eutrichodesmus dorsiangulatus Zhang, 1993
- Eutrichodesmus filisetiger Golovatch, Geoffroy, Mauriès & VandenSpiegel, 2009
- Eutrichodesmus gremialis Hoffman, 1982
- Eutrichodesmus griseus Golovatch, Geoffroy, Mauriès & VandenSpiegel, 2009
- Eutrichodesmus incisus Golovatch, Geoffroy, Mauriès & VandenSpiegel, 2009
- Eutrichodesmus latus Golovatch, Geoffroy, Mauriès & VandenSpiegel, 2009
- Eutrichodesmus macclurei Hoffman, 1977
- Eutrichodesmus monodentus Zhang, 1993
- Eutrichodesmus multilobatus Golovatch, Geoffroy, Mauriès & VandenSpiegel, 2009
- Eutrichodesmus paraster Liu, Golovatch & Wesener, 2017
- Eutrichodesmus parvus Liu, Golovatch & Wesener, 2017
- Eutrichodesmus peculiaris Murakami, 1966
- Eutrichodesmus reclinatus Hoffman, 1977
- Eutrichodesmus reductus Golovatch, Geoffroy, Mauriès & VandenSpiegel, 2009
- Eutrichodesmus regularis Golovatch, Geoffroy, Mauriès & VandenSpiegel, 2009
- Eutrichodesmus similis Golovatch, Geoffroy, Mauriès & VandenSpiegel, 2009
- Eutrichodesmus steineri Liu, Golovatch & Wesener, 2017

== Gallery ==
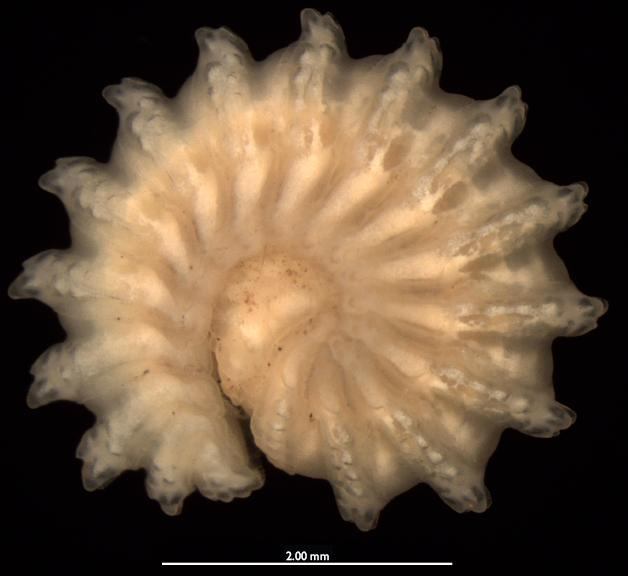
E. asteroides

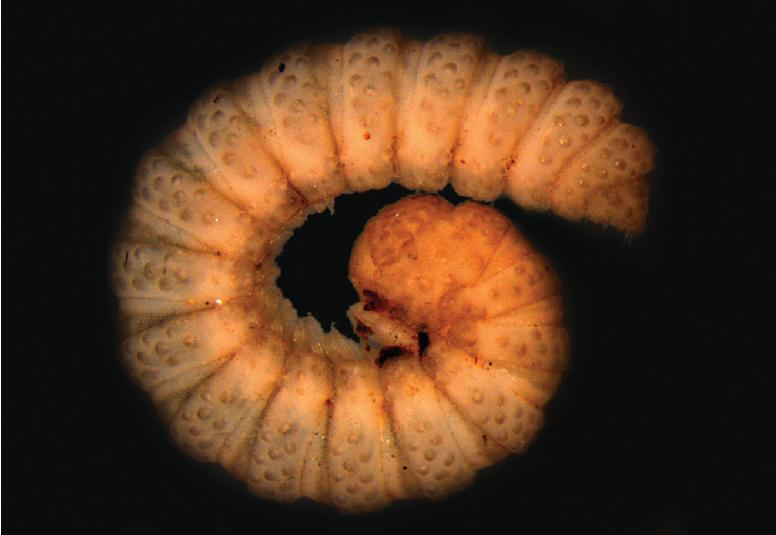
E. curticornis

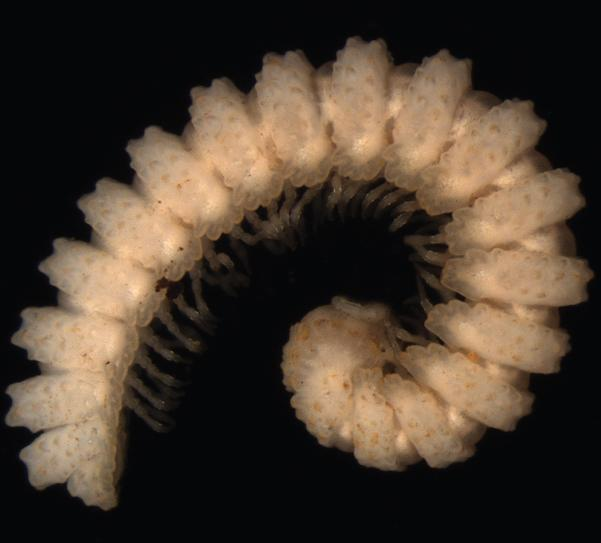
E. distinctus

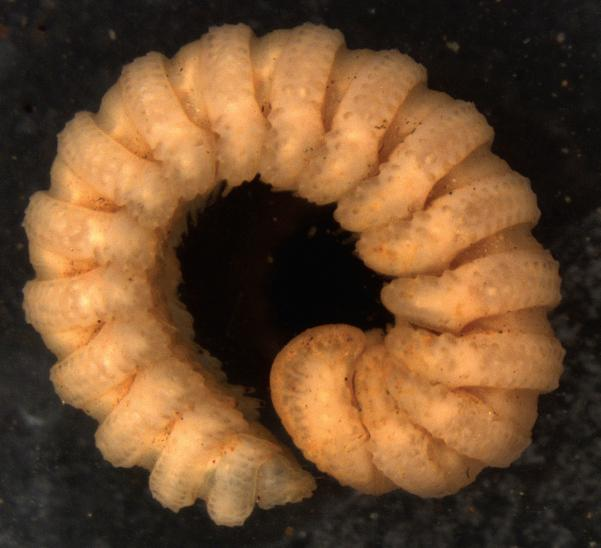
E. filisetiger

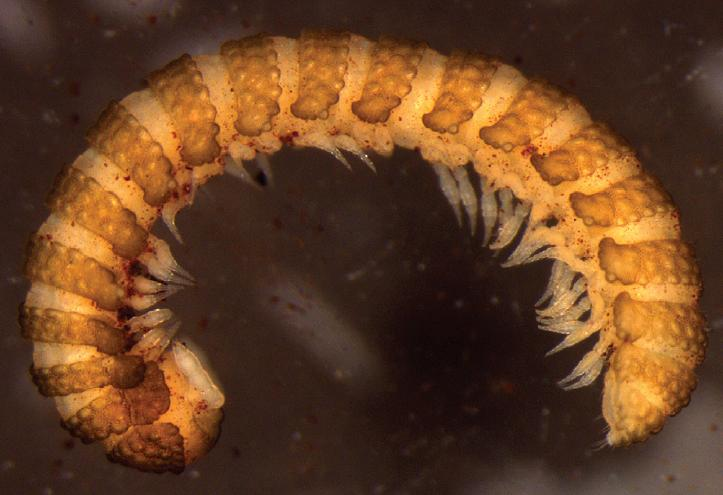
E. griseus

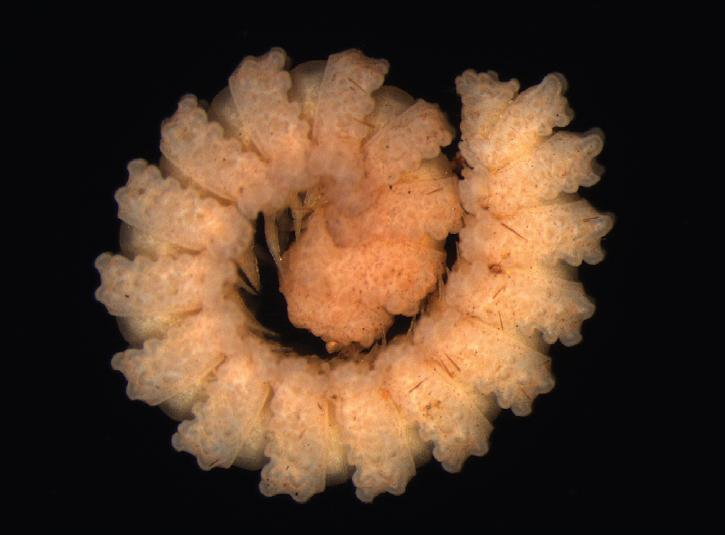
E. multilobatus

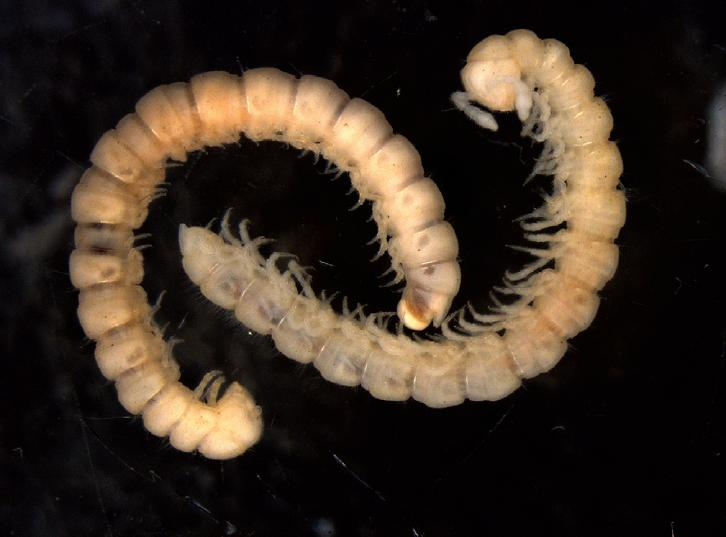
E. reductus

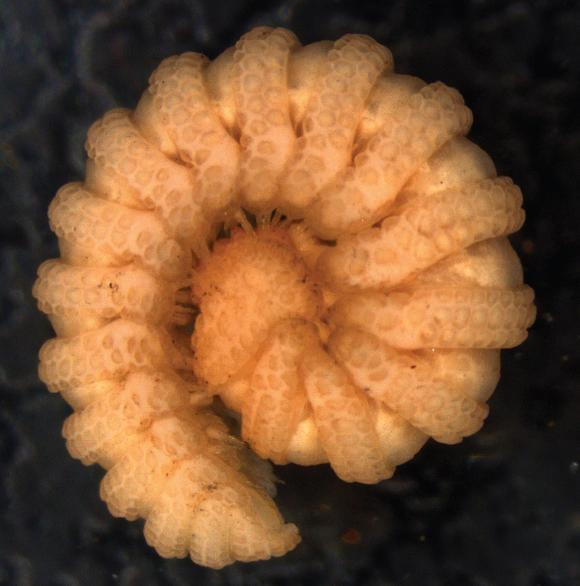
E. regularis
