= Macratria confusa =

Scientific classification
- Domain: Eukaryota
- Kingdom: Animalia
- Phylum: Arthropoda
- Class: Insecta
- Order: Coleoptera
- Suborder: Polyphaga
- Infraorder: Cucujiformia
- Family: Anthicidae
- Genus: Macratria
- Species: M. confusa

Binomial name
- Macratria confusa LeConte, 1855

Synonyms
- Macratria ovicollis Casey, 1895

Species of beetle

Macratria confusa is a species of antlike flower beetle in the family Anthicidae. It is found in North America.
