= Doratodesmus hispidus =

Scientific classification
- Kingdom: Animalia
- Phylum: Arthropoda
- Subphylum: Myriapoda
- Class: Diplopoda
- Order: Polydesmida
- Family: Haplodesmidae
- Genus: Doratodesmus
- Species: D. hispidus

Binomial name
- Doratodesmus hispidus (Hoffman, 1978)

Synonyms
- Selminarchus hispidus Hoffman, 1978

Species of millipede

Doratodesmus hispidus is a species of flat-backed millipede in the family Haplodesmidae. This millipede is found in Papua New Guinea. This millipede is notable for featuring only 18 segments (counting the collum as the first segment and the telson as the last) in each sex rather than the 20 segments normally observed in the order Polydesmida.

== Discovery and distribution ==
This species was first described in 1978 by the American zoologist Richard L. Hoffman. He based the original description of this species on an adult male holotype, four adult paratypes (two males and two females), and three immature specimens. These specimens were found in 1975 in the Selminum Tem cave on the Finim Tel plateau in the Western Province of Papua New Guinea. This species is still known only from this cave. The male holotype and paratypes including both sexes are deposited in the National Museum of Natural History in Sofia in Bulgaria.

== Taxonomy ==
Hoffman originally described this species as the type species for a new monotypic genus, Selminarchus. In 2009, however, authorities deemed Selminarchus to be a junior synonym for Doratodesmus. Furthermore, these genera had until then been placed in the family Doratodesmidae, but in 2009, authorities also deemed Doratodesmidae to be a junior synonym of Haplodesmidae. Authorities now accept Doratodesmus hispidus as the valid name for this species and place this species in the family Haplodesmidae.

== Description ==
The male holotype measures about 5.5 mm in length with a maximum width of 1.6 mm, and the female paratypes are similar in size. This millipede is uniformly a pale brownish red when preserved but is probably white when alive. On most segments, the dorsal surface features slightly raised flat areas arranged in irregular transverse rows, often forming three rows.

The adult of each sex features only 18 segments (including the telson). Accordingly, the adult female features only 27 pairs of legs, whereas the adult male features only 26 pairs of walking legs, excluding the eighth leg pair, which become gonopods. The distal element of each of the gonopods (telopodite) in adult males of this species is simple, with a stout base tapering gradually into a short flat distal element that curves at the end. The groove that carries the sperm runs along the dorsal side of the gonopod to the tip of the distal element (solenomere).

This species shares many traits with other species in the genus Doratodesmus. For example, like other species in this genus, this species features a collum that is somewhat reduced and paranota on the second segment that are enlarged laterally. Furthermore, like most other species in this genus, this species features gonopod telopodites with stout basal elements.

This species shares a more extensive set of traits with another species in the same genus, D. pholeter, which was discovered in another cave on the Finim Tel plateau in the Western Province of Papua New Guinea. For example, both species feature adult males with 18 segments and gonopod telopodites that are simple with short solenomeres. Furthermore, most segments in each species feature transverse rows of raised flat areas.

These two species can be distinguished, however, based on other traits. For example, D. pholeter exhibits sexual dimorphism in segment number, with females featuring 19 segments, whereas both the female and the male of D. hispidus feature only 18 segments. Furthermore, the gonopod telopodite in D. hispidus simply tapers and ends in a curved solenomere, whereas the gonopod telopodite in D. pholeter divides into two distal branches, a longer branch and a shorter solenomere.
