= Doratodesmus pholeter =

Scientific classification
- Kingdom: Animalia
- Phylum: Arthropoda
- Subphylum: Myriapoda
- Class: Diplopoda
- Order: Polydesmida
- Family: Haplodesmidae
- Genus: Doratodesmus
- Species: D. pholeter

Binomial name
- Doratodesmus pholeter (Hoffman, 1978)

Synonyms
- Scolopopyge pholeter Hoffman, 1978

Species of millipede

Doratodesmus pholeter is a species of flat-backed millipede in the family Haplodesmidae. This millipede is found in Papua New Guinea. This species is notable for featuring adult males with only 18 segments (counting the collum as the first segment and the telson as the last) rather than the 20 segments normally observed in the order Polydesmida. This species also exhibits sexual dimorphism in segment number, with 19 segments in adult females but only 18 segments in adult males.

== Discovery and distribution ==
This species was first described in 1978 by the American zoologist Richard L. Hoffman. He based the original description of this species on an adult male holotype, an adult female paratype, and four immature females. These specimens were found in 1975 in the upper west chamber of the Bitip Cave on the Finim Tel plateau in the Western Province of Papua New Guinea. This species is still known only from this cave. The male holotype and female paratype are deposited in the National Museum of Natural History in Sofia in Bulgaria.

== Taxonomy ==
Hoffman originally described this species as the type species for a new monotypic genus, Scolopopyge. In 2009, however, authorities deemed Scolopopyge to be a junior synonym for Doratodesmus. Furthermore, these genera had until then been placed in the family Doratodesmidae, but in 2009, authorities also deemed Doratodesmidae to be a junior synonym of Haplodesmidae. Authorities now accept Doratodesmus pholeter as the valid name for this species and place this species in the family Haplodesmidae.

== Description ==
The male holotype measures about 8.5 mm (0.33 in) in length with a maximum width of 1.6 mm (0.063 in), whereas the female paratype measures 1.7 mm (0.067 in) in width. The dorsal surface of the male holotype is light to medium brown, but the antennae and legs are white, and the head, sides of the body, and telson range from light brown to a brownish red. The female paratype has a brownish body with dark anterior segments that shade toward brownish red at the posterior end.

The collum has the shape of a transverse oval and is not as wide as the head. The second segment features enlarged paranota shaped like fans. The remaining segments in front of the telson are similar in form with rounded corners. On most segments, the dorsal surface features two transverse series of raised flat areas. The adult male features 18 segments (including the telson), whereas the adult female features 19 segments. With only 19 segments, the adult female features only 29 pairs of legs, and with only 18 segments, the adult male features only 26 pairs of walking legs, excluding the eighth leg pair, which become gonopods.

The distal elements of the gonopods (telopodites) are relatively small and oriented nearly transverse to the body axis. The basal part of the telopodites are very stout and in contact with one another in the middle. The distal part of each telopodite ends in two branches, including a simple pointed blade and a similar longer branch. The groove that carries the sperm curves around the telopodite and runs along the ventral surface of the shorter branch (solenomere), where it terminates.

This species shares many traits with other species in the genus Doratodesmus. For example, like other species in this genus, this species features a collum that is somewhat reduced and paranota on the second segment that are enlarged laterally. Furthermore, like most other species in this genus, this species is capable of tight volvation and features gonopod telopodites with stout basal elements.

This species shares a more extensive set of traits with another species in the same genus, D. hispidus, which was discovered in another cave on the Finim Tel plateau in the Western Province of Papua New Guinea. For example, both species feature adult males with 18 segments and gonopod telopodites that are simple with short solenomeres. Furthermore, most segments in each species feature transverse rows of raised flat areas.

These two species can be distinguished, however, based on other traits. For example, the female of D. hispidus features 18 segments, whereas the female of D. pholeter features 19 segments. Furthermore, whereas the gonopod telopodite in D. pholeter divides into two branches, the gonopod telopodite in D. hispidus simply tapers and ends in a curved solenomere.
