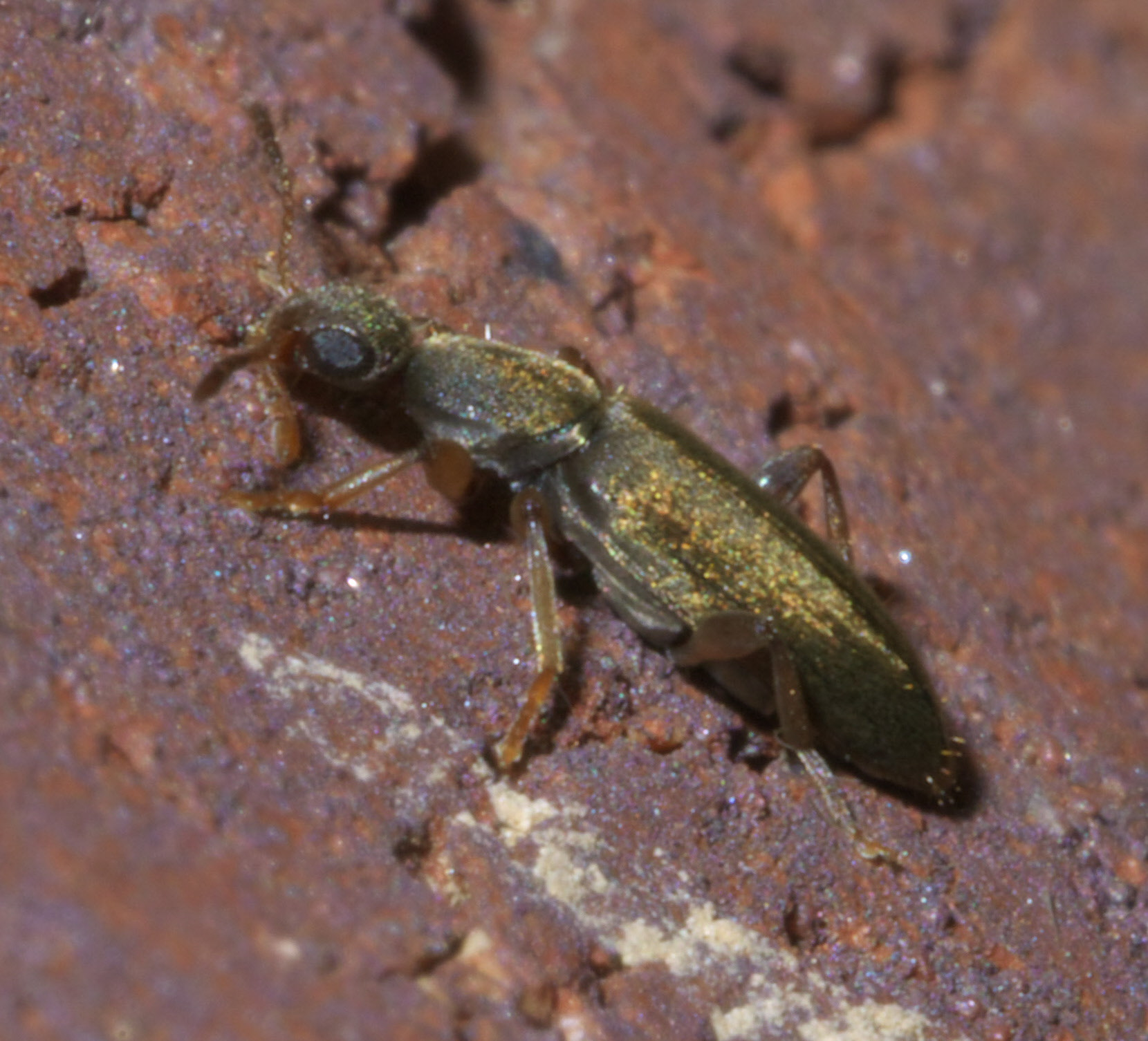
- Macratria murina

Scientific classification
- Kingdom: Animalia
- Phylum: Arthropoda
- Clade: Pancrustacea
- Class: Insecta
- Order: Coleoptera
- Suborder: Polyphaga
- Infraorder: Cucujiformia
- Family: Anthicidae
- Subfamily: Macratriinae
- Genus: Macratria; Newman, 1838

Synonyms
- Macrarthrius LaFerté-Sénectère, 1849

= Macratria =

Genus of beetles

Macratria is a genus of antlike flower beetles in the family Anthicidae. There are more than 30 described species in Macratria.

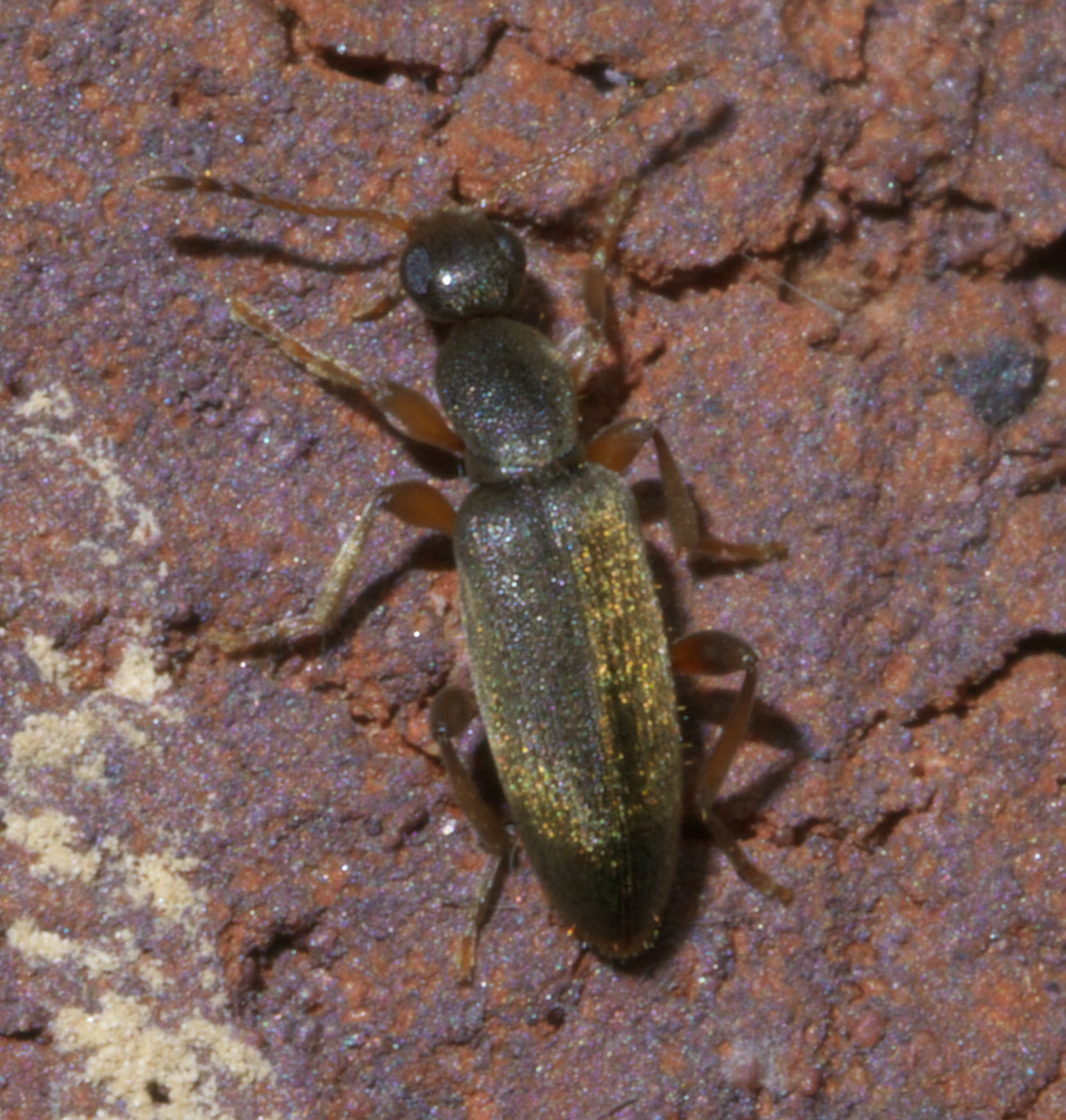
Macratria murina

== Species ==
These 37 species belong to the genus Macratria:

- Macrarthrius pallipes Motschulsky, 1863
- Macratria abun Telnov, 2012
- Macratria alleni Telnov, 2012
- Macratria aotearoa Werner & Chandler, 1995
- Macratria appendiculata (Abdullah, 1964)
- Macratria asmat Telnov, 2012
- Macratria ayamaru Telnov, 2017
- Macratria berdnikovi Telnov, 2017
- Macratria brazzaensis Telnov, 2012
- Macratria brunnea Casey, 1895
- Macratria citak Telnov, 2017
- Macratria confusa LeConte, 1855
- Macratria cryptica Telnov, 2012
- Macratria dani Telnov, 2011
- Macratria durrelli Telnov, 2025
- Macratria eparaksts Telnov, 2017
- Macratria femoralis Champion, 1896
- Macratria forficula Telnov, 2012
- Macratria gigantea Wickham, 1910
- Macratria griseosellata
- Macratria hungarica (Hampe, 1873)
- Macratria marind Telnov, 2017
- Macratria murina (Fabricius, 1801)
- Macratria obiensis Telnov, 2017
- Macratria opaca Telnov, 2012
- Macratria patani Telnov, 2017
- Macratria pluvialis Telnov, 2012
- Macratria pseudodensata Telnov, 2012
- Macratria rectipilis Telnov, 2012
- Macratria riparia Telnov, 2012
- Macratria sahu Telnov, 2017
- Macratria serialis Marseul, 1876
- Macratria spathulata Telnov, 2012
- Macratria succinia Abdullah, 1965
- Macratria tamarau Telnov, 2012
- Macratria testaceilabris Pic, 1940
- Macratria trimembris Telnov, 2012
- Macratria tripunctata (Abdullah, 1964)
