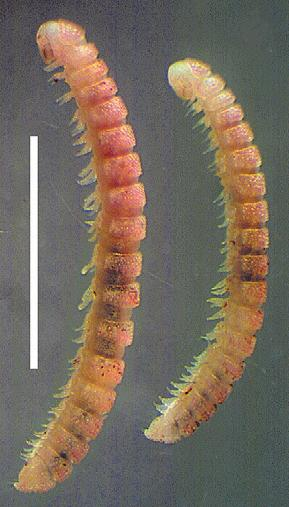
- Inodesmus steeli

Scientific classification
- Domain: Eukaryota
- Kingdom: Animalia
- Phylum: Arthropoda
- Subphylum: Myriapoda
- Class: Diplopoda
- Order: Polydesmida
- Family: Haplodesmidae
- Genus: Inodesmus; Cook, 1896

Species
- See text

Synonyms
- Agathodesmus Silvestri, 1910; Atapogonus Carl, 1926

= Inodesmus =

Genus of millipedes

Inodesmus is a genus of millipedes in the family Haplodesmidae, first described by Orator F. Cook in 1896. The type species is I. jamaicensis. This genus exhibits a disjunct distribution, with species found in Colombia, Jamaica, New Caledonia, and the Australian states of Queensland, New South Wales, Victoria, and South Australia.

== Taxonomy ==
Assignment to the family Haplodesmidae is currently uncertain. Agathodesmus, described by Silvestri in 1910, and Atopogonus, described by J. Carl in 1926, are regarded as junior synonyms of Inodesmus.

=== Species ===
The genus Inodesmus consists of the following accepted species:

- Inodesmus adelphus (Mesibov, 2013)
- Inodesmus aenigmaticus (Mesibov, 2013)
- Inodesmus agnus (Mesibov, 2013)
- Inodesmus anici (Mesibov, 2013)
- Inodesmus baccatus (Carl, 1926)
- Inodesmus bonang (Mesibov, 2013)
- Inodesmus bucculentus (Jeekel, 1986)
- Inodesmus carorum (Mesibov, 2013)
- Inodesmus chandleri (Mesibov, 2013)
- Inodesmus gayundah (Mesibov, 2013)
- Inodesmus hahnensis (Mesibov, 2013)
- Inodesmus jamaicensis Cook, 1896
- Inodesmus johnsi (Mesibov, 2009)
- Inodesmus kerensis (Mesibov, 2013)
- Inodesmus kirrama (Mesibov, 2013)
- Inodesmus millaa (Mesibov, 2013)
- Inodesmus morwellensis (Mesibov, 2013)
- Inodesmus parapholeus (Mesibov, 2013)
- Inodesmus quintanus (Mesibov, 2013)
- Inodesmus sagma (Mesibov, 2013)
- Inodesmus steeli (Silvestri, 1910)
- Inodesmus summus (Mesibov, 2013)
- Inodesmus urbanus (Romero-Rincon & Douch, 2024)
- Inodesmus yuccabinensis Mesibov, 2013)
