= Dmitry Telnov =

Latvian entomologist (born 1975)

- Дмитрий Тельнов
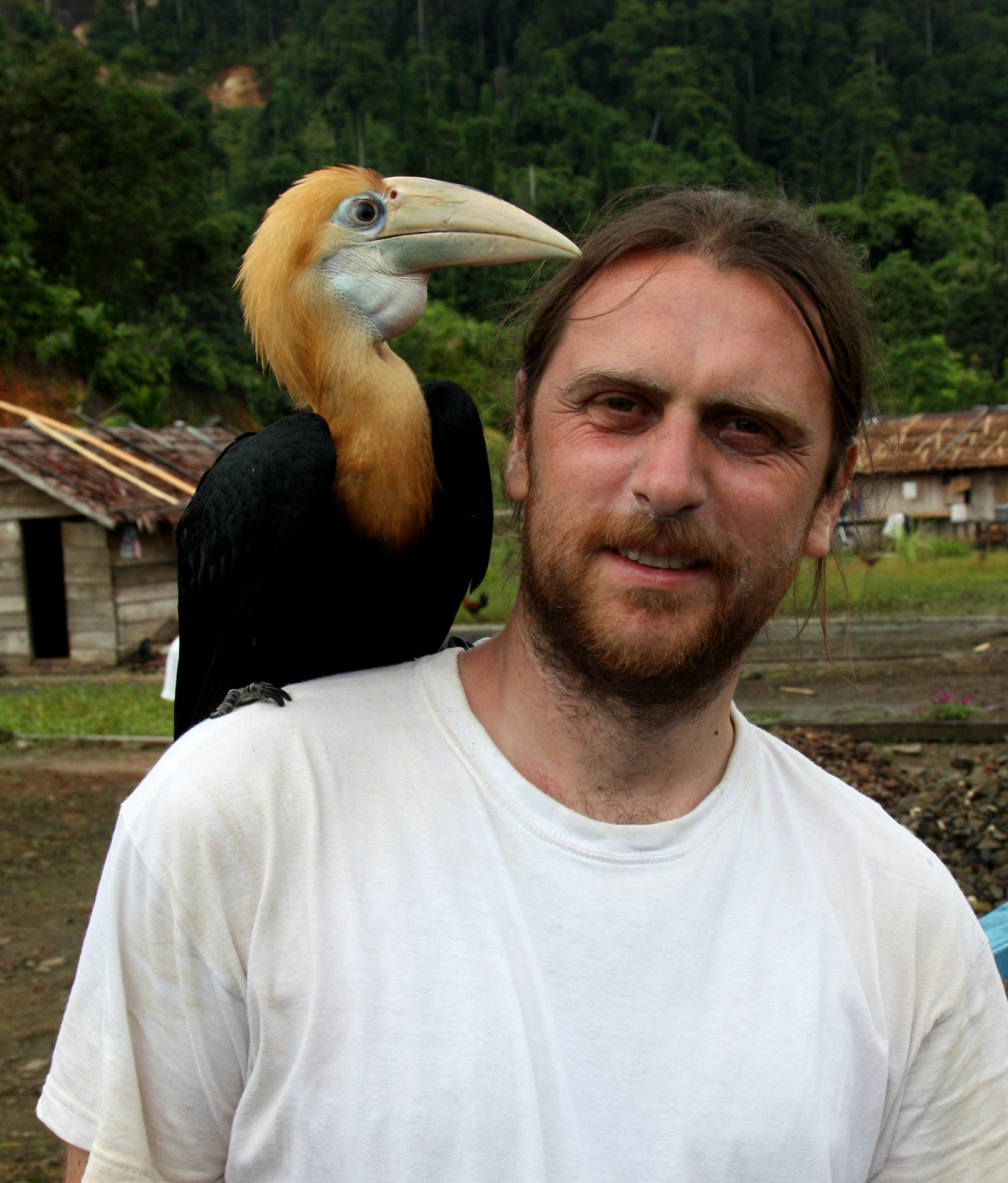
- With Blyth's hornbill in Indonesia, February 2012
- Born: 11 May 1975 (age 51); Riga, Latvia
- Education: University of Latvia
- Website: www.researchgate.net/profile/Dmitry_Telnov2

Dmitry Telnov (born 11 May 1975) is a Latvian entomologist, biogeographer, and conservationist. He is a fellow and a former president of the Entomological Society of Latvia as well as the executive editor of the "Biodiversity, biogeography and nature conservation in Wallacea and New Guinea" book series, as well as a member of the editorial board of the "Latvijas Entomologs", ZooKeys and Tijdschift voor Entomologie journals. He is primarily known for his taxonomic works on Coleoptera and biogeographic research in the Papuan region and in the Wallacea.

Telnov has a PhD degree in biology and has graduated from the University of Latvia. He strongly believes that an educated society is the key tool for biological diversity protection of our planet. Recently, Telnov has worked for The International Union for Conservation of Nature (IUCN) contributing to the European Red List of saproxylic (deadwood connected) beetles.

Telnov has travelled extensively in various countries in search of specimens, including New Guinea (more than ten years of expeditions), Ecuador, Indonesia, Gabon, Nepal, Singapore, Solomon Islands, Russia, Ukraine and all across Europe. He has discovered numerous species of invertebrates and vertebrates new to science. Dmitry Telnov is co-operating with numerous natural history museums and institutions all around the world, primarily in the taxonomy field.

== New taxa named for Dmitry Telnov ==
More than 70 animal taxa have been named in his honor by fellow scientists, including:

Mollusca

Cyclophoridae

Ditropopsis telnovi Greķe, 2014 (Raja Ampat Islands: Waigeo Island)

Diplommatinidae

Diplommatina telnovi Greķe, 2017 (New Guinea: Doberai & Onin peninsulas, Raja Ampat Islands: Misool Island)

Palaina telnovi Greķe, 2017 (Raja Ampat Islands: Waigeo Island)

Truncatellidae

Taheitia telnovi Greķe et Slapcinsky, 2021 (Raja Ampat Islands: Misool Island)

Diplopoda

Chelodesmidae

Trichomorpha telnovi Golovatch, 2024 (Ecuador)

Haplodesmidae

Cylindrodesmus telnovorum Golovatch, 2018 (Java)

Paradoxosomatidae

Tectoporus telnovi Golovatch, 2016 (New Guinea: Doberai Peninsula)

Delarthrum telnovi Golovatch, 2023 (Nepal)

Polydesmidae

Epanerchodus telnovi Golovatch, 2022 (Nepal)

Scorpiones

Chaerilidae

Chaerilus telnovi Lourenco, 2009 (North Moluccas: Halmahera Island)

Insecta

Phasmatodea

Phylliidae

Phyllium telnovi Brock, 2014 (New Guinea: Doberai Peninsula)

Orthoptera

Tetrigidae

Palaioscaria telnovi Tumbrinck, 2015 (Papua New Guinea: Eastern Highlands Province)

Coleoptera

Carabidae

Afrosyleter telnovi Bulirsch et Magrini, 2019 (Gabon)

Polyrhanis telnovi Wiesner et Anichtchenko, 2025 (New Guinea)

Procletodema telnovi Schüle, 2021 (Gabon)

Therates telnovi Wiesner et Anichtchenko, 2025 (Vietnam)

Staphylinidae

Amphichroum telnovi Shavrin, 2022 (Nepal)

Bledius telnovi Blinstein, 2024 (India: Arunachal Pradesh)

Frischianus telnovi Frisch in Frisch & Lee, 2025 (Borneo: Sabah)

Gyrophaena telnovi Enushchenko in Enushchenko, Shavrin, Palatov & Peretolchina, 2026 (Philippines: Mindanao)

Paraphloeostiba telnovi Shavrin, 2024 (Papua New Guinea)

Scaphisoma telnovi Löbl et Ogawa, 2017 (New Guinea: Doberai Peninsula)

Stenus telnovi Puthz, 2009 (North Moluccas: Halmahera Island)

Trichodromeus telnovi Shavrin, 2024 (Nepal)

Scarabaeidae

Holopycnia telnovi Keith, 2011 (Sulawesi)

Maechidius telnovi Prokofiev, 2022 (New Guinea)

Rhyparus telnovietbarclayi Minkina et Jákl, 2024 (Sulawesi)

Lycidae

Cladophorus dmitryi Kazantsev, 2017 (New Guinea: Doberai Peninsula)

Cladophorus telnovi Kazantsev, 2017 (New Guinea: Onin Peninsula)

Ditua telnovi Kazantsev, 2016 (New Guinea: Onin Peninsula)

Eulycus (Lobentis) telnovi Kazantsev, 2018 (Gabon)

Falsolucidota telnovi Kazantsev, 2016 (Raja Ampat Islands: Misool Island)

Isuarhynchus telnovi Kazantsev, 2026 (Solomon Islands: Guadalcanal)

Metriorrhynchus telnovi Kazantsev, 2016 (New Guinea: Doberai Peninsula)

Lobatang (Spinotrichalus) telnovi (Kazantsev, 2009) (North Moluccas: Halmahera Island)

Dermestidae

Thaumaglossa telnovi Háva, 2022 (Sulawesi)

Elateridae

Csikia telnovi Schimmel, 2015 (China)

Buprestidae

Endelus (Papuadelus) telnovi Kalashian, 2017 (New Guinea: Doberai Peninsula)

Cryptophagidae

Atomaria (Anchicera) telnovi Lyubarski & Perkovski, 2023 (Rovno amber)

Nitidulidae

Epuraea (Haptoncus) telnovi Kirejtshuk, 2017 (New Guinea: Doberai Peninsula)

Tenebrionidae

Amarygmus telnovi Bremer, 2022 (Peninsular Malaysia)

Corticeus (Tylophloeus) telnovi Bremer, 2022 (Saint Vincent and the Grenadines)

Eudysantes telnovi Ando et Yamasako, 2021 (East Malaysia: Sabah)

Laena telnovi Schawaller & Bellersheim, 2024 (Nepal)

Penthicus telnovi Nabozhenko & Mofrad, 2025 (Iran)

Platydema telnovi Schawaller & Bellersheim, 2022 (Gabon)

Vaclavka telnovi Novák, 2021 (Sulawesi)

Anthicidae

Endomia telnovi Degiovanni, 2016 (Zambia)

Furcanthicus telnovi Zhao et Wang in Zhao, Wang, Lee & Bai, 2023 (China: Yunnan)

Lemodes telnovi Young, 2011 (New Guinea: Doberai Peninsula)

Ischaliidae

subgenus Telnovia Alekseev et Bukejs, 2017 (Balitc amber), genus Ischalia

Cerambycidae

Atelais telnovi Skale et Weigel, 2022 (Raja Ampat Islands & W New Guinea)

Callimetopus telnovi Barševskis, 2020 (Sulawesi)

Dere telnovi Barševskis, 2021 (The Philippines: Palawan)

Iproca telnovi Barševskis & Funikova, 2025 (Vietnam)

Myagrus telnovi Barševskis, Medina & Funikova, 2025 (Vietnam)

Protilema telnovi Vitali, 2018 (Northern New Guinea)

Tmesisternus telnovi Weigel, 2018 (Lesser Sunda Islands: Sumba Island)

Zamium telnovi Adlbauer, 2025 (Republic of South Africa)

Chrysomelidae

Coenobius telnovi L.N. Medvedev, 2017 (Southern New Guinea)

Mimastra telnovi L.N. Medvedev, 2018 (Java)

Pyrrhalta telnovi L.N. Medvedev, 2017 (New Guinea: Doberai Peninsula)

Stethotes telnovi L.N. Medvedev, 2017 (New Guinea: Doberai Peninsula)

Anthribidae

Nessiara telnovi Frieser, 2010 (Raja Ampat Islands: Misool Island)

Protaedus telnovi Frieser, 2009 (North Moluccas: Halmahera Island)

Brentidae

Orthorhynchoides (Guineorhinotia) telnovi Legalov, 2018 (Northern New Guinea)

Spatherhinus telnovi Orbach & Bartolozzi, 2023 (Ivory Coast)

Succinapion telnovi Legalov et Bukejs, 2013 (Baltic amber)

Belidae

Orthorhynchus dmitrii Legalov, 2023 (New Guinea: Central Cordillera)

Curculionidae

Dryophthoroides telnovi Legalov, 2022 (New Guinea: Central Cordillera)

Orchestes (Nomizo) telnovi Legalov, 2020 (New Guinea: Doberai Peninsula)

Stenommatus telnovi Legalov, 2022 (New Guinea: Central Cordillera)

Tivicis telnovi Legalov, 2025 (New Guinea: Central Cordillera)

== New taxa described by Dmitry Telnov ==
Dmitry Telnov named more than 600 animal taxa new for science, mainly of Coleoptera but also one aquatic Hemiptera:

Coleoptera

Anthicidae

Tomoderinae

Elgonidium aberdareum Telnov, 2008 (Kenya)

Elgonidium bartolozzii Telnov, 2012 (Tanzania)

Elgonidium mountkenyanum Telnov, 2008 (Kenya)

Elgonidium oculatum Telnov, 2008 (Kenya)

Macrotomoderus alisae (Telnov, 2004) (Borneo)

Macrotomoderus andibani Telnov, 2007 (China)

Macrotomoderus angelinii Telnov, 2022 (China)

Macrotomoderus angulatus (Telnov, 2004) (Borneo)

Macrotomoderus belousovi Telnov, 2022 (China)

Macrotomoderus bicrispus Telnov, 2022 (China)

Macrotomoderus blinsteini Telnov, 2024 (China)

Macrotomoderus boops Telnov, 2022 (China)

Macrotomoderus bordonii Telnov, 2022 (China)

Macrotomoderus brevitaticornis (Telnov, 2004) (Borneo)

Macrotomoderus bukejsi Telnov, 2018 (China)

Macrotomoderus chingpo Telnov, 2018 (China)

Macrotomoderus cincinnulatus (Telnov, 2004) (Borneo)

Macrotomoderus conus Telnov, 2018 (China)

Macrotomoderus cornutus (Telnov, 2004) (Borneo)

Macrotomoderus dali Telnov, 2022 (China)

Macrotomoderus damaskai Telnov, 2023 (Philippines: Mindanao)

Macrotomoderus davawenyo Telnov, 2023 (Philippines: Mindanao)

Macrotomoderus darrenmanni Telnov, 2018 (China)

Macrotomoderus daxiangling Telnov, 2022 (China)

Macrotomoderus ectypus (Telnov, 2004) (Borneo)

Macrotomoderus erratus (Telnov, 2006) (Sumatra)

Macrotomoderus femoridens Telnov, 2022 (China)

Macrotomoderus gentingensis Telnov, 2010 (W Malaysia)

Macrotomoderus gracilis Telnov, 2018 (China)

Macrotomoderus hajeki Telnov, 2022 (China)

Macrotomoderus hamiguitan Telnov, 2023 (Philippines: Mindanao)

Macrotomoderus hartmanni Telnov, 2022 (China)

Macrotomoderus hengduan Telnov, 2022 (China)

Macrotomoderus hirsutus Telnov, 2024 (China)

Macrotomoderus imitator Telnov, 2022 (China)

Macrotomoderus jiuhuanus Telnov, 2007 (China)

Macrotomoderus kabaki Telnov, 2022 (China)

Macrotomoderus kawa Telnov, 2018 (China)

Macrotomoderus kirscheyi Telnov, 2023 (Philippines: Mindanao)

Macrotomoderus korolevi Telnov, 2022 (China)

Macrotomoderus kurbatovi (Telnov, 1998) (China)

Macrotomoderus lapidarius Telnov, 2022 (China)

Macrotomoderus makarovi Telnov, 2018 (China)

Macrotomoderus maranao Telnov, 2023 (Philippines: Mindanao)

Macrotomoderus microgracilicollis Telnov, 2007 (Borneo)

Macrotomoderus microscopicus Telnov, 2018 (China)

Macrotomoderus mirabilis Telnov, 2018 (China)

Macrotomoderus monstratus Telnov, 2018 (China)

Macrotomoderus monstrificabilis Telnov, 2018 (China)

Macrotomoderus muli Telnov, 2022 (China)

Macrotomoderus negator Telnov, 2007 (China)

Macrotomoderus palaung Telnov, 2022 (China)

Macrotomoderus peniculatus (Telnov, 2004) (Borneo)

Macrotomoderus perforatus Telnov, 2018 (China)

Macrotomoderus periclitatus Telnov, 2018 (China)

Macrotomoderus pseudogracilicollis Telnov, 2007 (Borneo)

Macrotomoderus riga (Telnov, 2001) (Malaysia)

Macrotomoderus rimaderoculis (Telnov, 2004) (Borneo)

Macrotomoderus sarawakensis (Telnov, 2004) (Borneo)

Macrotomoderus schuelkei Telnov, 2018 (China)

Macrotomoderus sichuanus (Telnov, 1998) (China)

Macrotomoderus silvicolus Telnov, 2018 (China)

Macrotomoderus similis Telnov, 2022 (China)

Macrotomoderus simulator Telnov, 2007 (Borneo)

Macrotomoderus spinicollis (Telnov, 2004) (Borneo)

Macrotomoderus spurisi Telnov, 2018 (China)

Macrotomoderus subanen Telnov, 2023 (Philippines: Mindanao)

Macrotomoderus tenuis Telnov, 2022 (China)

Macrotomoderus transitans Telnov, 2022 (China)

Macrotomoderus truncatlus Telnov, 2022 (China)

Macrotomoderus turpiculus Telnov, 2024 (China)

Macrotomoderus uhmanni (Telnov, 1998) (China)

Macrotomoderus unicus Telnov, 2023 (Philippines: Mindanao)

Macrotomoderus usitatus Telnov, 2022 (China)

Macrotomoderus wudu Telnov, 2022 (China)

Macrotomoderus wuliangshan Telnov, 2018 (China)

Macrotomoderus yunnanus (Telnov, 1998) (China)

Pseudotomoderus antennatus Telnov, 2011 (New Guinea)

Pseudotomoderus reidi Telnov, 2021 (Timor Leste)

Pseudotomoderus sulawesianus Telnov, 2005 (Sulawesi)

Rimaderus bonadonai Telnov, 2018 (S India)

Rimaderus montivagus Telnov, 2003 (Nepal)

Rimaderus sahyadri Telnov, 2018 (S India)

Tomoderus absimilis Telnov, 2001 (The Philippines: Luzon)

Tomoderus agta Telnov, 2023 (Philippines: Luzon)

Tomoderus albiclavus Telnov, 2005 (Sulawesi)

Tomoderus balianus Telnov, 2021 (The Lesser Sunda Islands: Bali)

Tomoderus balticus Telnov, 2012 (Baltic amber; fossil)

Tomoderus barclayi Telnov, 2005 (Sulawesi)

Tomoderus cavithorax Telnov et Degiovanni, 2021 (Chile)

Tomoderus circiter Telnov, 2005 (Sulawesi)

Tomoderus clepsammium Telnov, 2005 (Sulawesi)

Tomoderus derarimusoides Telnov, 2005 (Sulawesi)

Tomoderus differens Telnov et Degiovanni, 2021 (Chile)

Tomoderus diversitatis Telnov, 2005 (Sulawesi)

Tomoderus dompu Telnov, 2021 (The Lesser Sunda Islands: Sumbawa)

Tomoderus dumogaensis dumogaensis Telnov, 2005 (Sulawesi)

Tomoderus dumogaensis orientalis Telnov, 2011 (New Guinea)

Tomoderus elegantithorax Telnov, 2001 (The Philippines: Luzon)

Tomoderus fasciatonitidus Telnov, 2001 (Nepal; N India)

Tomoderus flagellipenis Telnov, 2005 (Sulawesi)

Tomoderus leaseensis Telnov, 2011 (Indonesia: Saparua)

Tomoderus lenis Telnov, 2005 (Sulawesi)

Tomoderus longelytratus Telnov, 2013 (Baltic amber; fossil)

Tomoderus mairasi Telnov, 2011 (New Guinea)

Tomoderus mediofasciatus Telnov, 2005 (Sulawesi)

Tomoderus medinai Telnov, 2023 (Philippines: Mindanao)

Tomoderus megapenis Telnov, 2011 (New Guinea)

Tomoderus melanocephalus Telnov et Degiovanni, 2021 (Chile)

Tomoderus mindanaoensis Telnov, 2001 (The Philippines: Mindanao, Palawan)

Tomoderus mindanaor Telnov, 2023 (Philippines: Mindanao)

Tomoderus minor Telnov, 2023 (Philippines: Mindanao)

Tomoderus monstrificus Telnov, 2005 (Sulawesi)

Tomoderus nahuelbuta Telnov et Degiovanni, 2021 (Chile)

Tomoderus napolovi Telnov, 1997 (Vietnam)

Tomoderus penicillus Telnov, 2023 (Philippines: Mindanao)

Tomoderus praemontanus Telnov, 2001 (N India)

Tomoderus pseudotrimaculatus Telnov, 2006 (New Guinea)

Tomoderus saecularis Telnov, Bukejs, 2019 (Baltic amber; fossil)

Tomoderus schmidti Telnov, 2018 (Nepal)

Tomoderus shavrini Telnov, 2023 (Philippines: Mindanao)

Tomoderus shkarupini Telnov, 2011 (Indonesia: Misool)

Tomoderus seramensis Telnov, 2011 (Indonesia: Seram)

Tomoderus sulcobasis Telnov, 2011 (New Guinea)

Tomoderus volucris Telnov, 2005 (Sulawesi)

Tomoderus vulcanicus Telnov, 2021 (Lesser Sunda Islands: Lombok)

Tomoderus wallacei Telnov, 2005 (Sulawesi)

Tomoderus ziczac Telnov, 2005 (Sulawesi)

Notoxinae

Notoxus adygheicus Telnov, 2016 (Russia: Caucasus)

Notoxus albrechti Telnov, 1998 (Rep. of South Africa)

Notoxus ales Telnov, 2007 (Thailand)

Notoxus bana Telnov, 2026 (Vietnam)

Notoxus eurasicus Telnov, 2016 (Russia: Urals)

Notoxus geminus Telnov, 2026 (Vietnam)

Notoxus hartmanni Telnov, 1998 (Rep. of South Africa)

Notoxus karshi Telnov & Kovalenko, 2026 (Tuyrkmenistan, Uzbekistan)

Notoxus psammophilus Telnov, 2007 (Vietnam)

Notoxus reuteri Telnov, 2018 (Turkey)

Notoxus spatulicornus Telnov, 2016 (Nepal)

Notoxus tricoloratus Telnov, 2016 (Azerbaijan)

Notoxus zambalensis Telnov, 2012 (The Philippines: Luzon)

Notoxus yelamala Telnov, 2025 (India: Western Ghats)

Mecynotarsus doberai Telnov, 2016 (New Guinea)

Mecynotarsus edwinus Telnov, 2000 (New Guinea)

Anthicinae

Formicomini

Anthelephila albifasciata Telnov, 1999 (Thailand)

Anthelephila ancorrifera Telnov, 2003 (India)

Anthelephila anthophila Telnov, 2021 (Timor Leste)

Anthelephila barsevskisi Telnov, 2021 (Timor)

Anthelephila burckhardti Telnov, 2003 (Sri Lanka, India)

Anthelephila gladia Telnov, 2003 (India)

Anthelephila mirabilis (Telnov, 1997) (Vietnam)

Anthelephila nusatenggara Telnov, 2021 (The Lesser Sunda Islands: Lombok)

Anthelephila panayensis Telnov, 2018 (The Philippines: Panay)

Anthelephila pygmaea Telnov, 2003 (Laos)

Anthelephila raja Telnov, 2003 (India)

Anthelephila tambora Telnov, 2021 (The Lesser Sunda Islands: Sumbawa)

Stenidius obliquesetosus Telnov, 2018 (Nepal)

Anthicini

Acanthinus selvaensis Telnov, 2001 (Peru)

Anthicomorphus badeng Telnov, 2021 (Indonesia: Bali)

Anthicomorphus biakensis Telnov, 2009 (Indonesia: Biak)

Anthicomorphus brunneus Telnov, 2009 (Sulawesi)

Anthicomorphus greensladei Telnov, 2009 (Solomon Islands)

Anthicomorphus himalayanus Telnov, 2010 (Nepal)

Anthicomorphus langbiang Telnov, 2024 (Vietnam)

Anthicomorphus legenyem Telnov, 2009 (Indonesia: Waigeo)

Anthicomorphus luteoornatus Telnov, 2026 (Vietnam)

Anthicomorphus martini Telnov, 2009 (New Guinea, Waigeo)

Anthicomorphus mimicus Telnov, 2016 (China: Shaanxi)

Anthicomorphus moluccanus Telnov, 2009 (North Moluccas)

Anthicomorphus orbachiTelnov, 2026 (Vietnam)

Anthicomorphus rufopubescens Telnov, 2009 (Indonesia: West Papua)

Anthicomorphus suppeditus Telnov, 2009 (Indonesia: West Papua)

Anthicomorphus tetraspilotus Telnov, 2026 (Vietnam)

Anthicomorphus weigeli Telnov, 2009 (Papua New Guinea: New Ireland)

Anthicus (A.) chitwanus Telnov, 2018 (Nepal)

Anthicus (A.) lobanovi Telnov, 2021 (China: Xinjiang – Uyghur)

Anthicus (A.) lepcha Telnov, 2018 (N India)

Anthicus (A.) mascarenensis Telnov, 2010 (Reunion)

Anthicus (A.) miroshnikovi Telnov, 2021 (Java; The Lesser Sunda Islands: Lombok; Timor Leste)

Anthicus (A.) monstrator Telnov, 2005 (China)

Anthicus (A.) oustaleti Telnov, 1999 (France; fossil)

Anthicus (A.) panayensis Telnov, 2005 (The Philippines: Panay)

Anthicus (A.) piratus Telnov, 2007 (United Arab Emirates)

Anthicus (A.) pseudoarmatus Telnov, 2007 (United Arab Emirates)

Anthicus (A.) renschi Telnov, 2021 (The Lesser Sunda Islands: Flores)

Anthicus (A.) vicarius Telnov, 2005 (China)

Anthicus (A.) vicinor Telnov, 2018 (Nepal)

Cyclodinus bucki Telnov, 2006 (Tanzania)

Cyclodinus phragmiteticola Telnov, 2018 (S Russia)

Endomia himalayana Telnov, 2016 (Nepal)

Endomia vanharteni Telnov, 2008 (United Arab Emirates)

Floydwernerius [genus] Telnov, 2003 (Australia)

Ischyropalpus aberratus Telnov et Degiovanni, 2021 (Chile)

Ischyropalpus fuscus Telnov, 2000 (Nicaragua)

Ischyropalpus quadrimaculatus Telnov et Degiovanni, 2021 (Chile)

Ischyropalpus similis Telnov et Degiovanni, 2021 (Chile)

Leptaleus sasajii Sakai, Telnov, 2001 (Japan)

Nitorus [genus] Telnov, 2007 (Palaearctic, Oriental, Afrotropical regions)

Nitorus antankarana Telnov, 2025 (Madagascar)

Nitorus caviculus Telnov, 2025 (Madagascar)

Nitorus ciliatus Telnov, 2025 (Madagascar)

Nitorus bucki Telnov, 2016 (Tanzania)

Nitorus mediator Telnov, 2024 (Taiwan)

Nitorus pauwelsi Telnov, 2016 (D.R. Congo)

Nitorus punctatithorax (Telnov, 1998) (Myanmar)

Nitorus sathulaz Telnov, 2024 (Vietnam)

Nitorus saxattilis Telnov, 2025 (Madagascar)

Nitorus sichuanus (Telnov, 2005) (China)

Nitorus suasum Telnov, 2010 (Afghanistan)

Nitorus succinius Telnov, Bukejs, 2019 (Baltic amber; fossil)

Nitorus tsingy Telnov, 2025 (Madagascar)

Nitorus uyghur Telnov, 2021 (China: Xinjiang – Uyghur)

Papuanthicus [genus] Telnov, 2006 (New Guinea, Wallacea)

Papuanthicus aemulus Telnov, 2006 (New Guinea)

Papuanthicus frustrator Telnov, 2010 (Sulawesi) (syn. of P. dilutus Pic)

Papuanthicus moluccensis Telnov, 2010 (North Moluccas)

Papuanthicus papuanus Telnov, 2006 (New Guinea)

Papuanthicus yali Telnov, 2016 (New Guinea)

Pseudocyclodinus [genus] Telnov, 2003 (Australia)

Pseudoleptaleus aruensis Telnov, 2010 (Indonesia: Aru Islands)

Pseudoleptaleus asmatus Telnov, 2007 (New Guinea)

Pseudoleptaleus formicabilis Telnov, 2007 (New Guinea)

Pseudoleptaleus formicomorphus Telnov, 2007 (New Guinea)

Pseudoleptaleus kristinae Telnov, 2007 (New Guinea: Bismarck Archipelago)

Pseudoleptaleus limbourgi Telnov, 2007 (New Guinea)

Sahulanthicus [genus] Telnov, 2018 (Australia, New Guinea)

Sapintus airi Telnov, 2014 (Solomon Islands)

Sapintus andreaskopetzi Telnov, 2014 (Nepal)

Sapintus angulapex Telnov, 2014 (The Philippines: Palawan)

Sapintus argenteofasciatus Telnov, 2003 (Australia)

Sapintus celeripes Telnov, 2014 (New Guinea)

Sapintus costae Telnov et Degiovanni, 2021 (Chile)

Sapintus curvatus Telnov, 2014 (Thailand)

Sapintus curvitibia Telnov, 2014 (Solomon Islands)

Sapintus degiovannii Telnov, 2021 (Timor Leste)

Sapintus densepunctatus Telnov, 2014 (New Guinea)

Sapintus dyaulensis Telnov, 2014 (New Guinea: Bismarck Archipelago)

Sapintus echinatus Telnov, 2014 (Indonesian Borneo)

Sapintus geminus Telnov, 2014 (New Guinea)

Sapintus gemitus Telnov, 2014 (Sulawesi)

Sapintus gracilentus Telnov, 2014 (Vietnam)

Sapintus hartmanni Telnov, 2014 (Nepal)

Sapintus lao Telnov, 2014 (Laos)

Sapintus macrops Telnov, 2014 (New Guinea)

Sapintus malut Telnov, 2014 (North Moluccas)

Sapintus mangrovicus Telnov, 2022 (Iran)

Sapintus monochromus Telnov, 2019 (New Caledonia)

Sapintus monstrosiantennatus Telnov, 2014 (Sulawesi)

Sapintus sexualis Telnov, 2014 (New Guinea)

Sapintus vietnamensis Telnov, 2014 (Vietnam)

Sapintus (Barbigerosapintus) subgen. nov. Telnov, 1998 (Vietnam)

Sapintus (Barbigerosapintus) confertopunctatus Telnov, 1998 (Vietnam)

Stricticomus desolatius Telnov, 2007 (United Arab Emirates)

Stricticomus kucha Telnov, 2021 (China: Xinjiang – Uyghur)

Stricticomus pseudotobias Telnov, 2010 (Nepal)

Stricticomus sternbergsi Telnov, 2005 (China)

Stricticomus zagrosanus Telnov, 2010 (Iran, Turkey)

Stricticomus zeravshanus Telnov, 2010 (Tadzhikistan)

Yunnanomonticola [genus] Telnov, 2002 (China)

Yunnanomonticola nanzhao Telnov, 2002 (China)

Microhoriini

Aulacoderus muehlei Telnov, 2018 (Namibia)

Aulacoderus nigroelytratus Telnov, 2014 (SAR)

Clavicomus absconditus Telnov, 2000 (Nepal)

Clavicomus afghanus Telnov, 2010 (Afghanistan)

Clavicomus anomalus Telnov, 1998 (China)

Clavicomus garze Telnov, 2018 (W China)

Clavicomus inabsolutus Telnov, 2003 (India: Sikkim)

Clavicomus indeprensus Telnov, 2000 (Nepal)

Clavicomus kejvali Telnov, 1999 (Thailand)

Clavicomus kham Telnov, 2018 (W China)

Clavicomus muguensis Telnov, 2000 (Nepal)

Clavicomus nigrofuscus Telnov, 2000 (Nepal)

Clavicomus variabilis Telnov, 2003 (Nepal)

Clavicomus weigeli Telnov, 2000 (Nepal)

Microhoria berrai Telnov & Degiovanni, 2024 (Greece)

Microhoria bremeri Telnov, 2022 (Turkey)

Microhoria bunun Telnov, 2024 (Taiwan)

Microhoria capreolus Telnov et Degiovanni in Telnov, 2022 (Turkey)

Microhoria finalis (Telnov, 2003) (Afghanistan)

Microhoria hindukushica Telnov, 2010 (Afghanistan)

Microhoria janssoni Telnov, 2022 (Turkey)

Microhoria lingua Telnov, 2024 (Taiwan)

Microhoria machairodus Telnov et Degiovanni in Telnov, 2022 (Turkey)

Microhoria mammuthus Telnov & Degiovanni, 2024 (Greece)

Microhoria medvedevi Telnov, 2004 (Mongolia)

Microhoria melecisi Telnov & Degiovanni, 2024 (Greece)

Microhoria muehlei Telnov et Degiovanni in Telnov, 2022 (Iran)

Microhoria orbitalis Telnov, 2022 (Iran)

Microhoria paxvobiscum Telnov, 2022 (Iraq)

Microhoria punctatissima Telnov, 2022 (Turkey)

Microhoria sabellai Telnov & Degiovanni, 2024 (Greece)

Microhoria quercus Telnov, 2022 (Turkey)

Microhoria taguan Telnov, 2024 (Taiwan)

Microhoria vetroveci Telnov & Degiovanni, 2024 (Greece)

Microhoria walkeri Telnov, 2022 (Turkey)

Neocrohoria [genus] Telnov, 2019 (Chile)

Macratriinae

Macratriini

Macratria abscondita Telnov, 2011 (New Guinea)

Macratria abun Telnov, 2012 (New Guinea)

Macratria administrator Telnov, 2011 (New Guinea)

Macratria afroaequatoris Telnov, 2016 (Rwanda)

Macratria alleni Telnov, 2012 (Baltic amber; fossil)

Macratria anus Telnov, 2023 (New Guinea)

Macratria apicata Telnov, 2011 (New Guinea)

Macratria aquila Telnov, 2011 (New Guinea)

Macratria areare Telnov, 2011 (Solomon Islands)

Macratria asmat Telnov, 2012 (New Guinea)

Macratria baliemensis Telnov, 2011 (New Guinea)

Macratria balkei Telnov, 2011 (New Guinea)

Macratria berdnikovi Telnov, 2017 (North Moluccas)

Macratria bicoloritarsis Telnov, 2011 (New Guinea)

Macratria bimaculosa Telnov, 2023 (New Guinea)

Macratria bojanabanae Telnov, 2007 (Java, Borneo)

Macratria bonggo Telnov, 2023 (New Guinea)

Macratria brazzaensis Telnov, 2012 (New Guinea)

Macratria bugle Telnov, 2023 (Panama)

Macratria caerulescens Telnov, 2011 (Sulawesi)

Macratria capreolus Telnov, 2011 (North Moluccas)

Macratria carbo Telnov, 2024 (Ecuador)

Macratria chitwana Telnov, 2003 (Nepal)

Macratria confertopunctata Telnov, 2011 (New Guinea)

Macratria conlei Telnov, 2023 (Ecuador)

Macratria cracens Telnov, 2011 (New Guinea)

Macratria cryptica Telnov, 2012 (New Guinea)

Macratria curtinotum Telnov, 2011 (Sulawesi)

Macratria curvamina Telnov, 2011 (New Guinea)

Macratria dani Telnov, 2011 (New Guinea)

Macratria debellatrix Telnov, 2011 (New Guinea)

Macratria dotyali Telnov, 2018 (Nepal)

Macratria dumogaensis Telnov, 2011 (Sulawesi)

Macratria durrelli Telnov, 2025 (Madagascar)

Macratria elegans Telnov, 2011 (New Guinea)

Macratria elongatissima Telnov, 2011 (New Guinea)

Macratria emacerata Telnov, 2011 (New Guinea)

Macratria fijiana Telnov, 2021 (Fiji)

Macratria finisterrensis Telnov, 2011 (New Guinea)

Macratria flaveosetosa Telnov, 2011 (New Guinea)

Macratria florsavichi Telnov, 2023 (Panama)

Macratria fore Telnov, 2011 (New Guinea)

Macratria forficula Telnov, 2012 (New Guinea)

Macratria fulvissima Telnov, 2011 (Sulawesi)

Macratria furva Telnov, 2011 (New Guinea)

Macratria fuscocyanea Telnov, 2011 (New Guinea)

Macratria gladia Telnov, 2011 (New Guinea)

Macratria grekei Telnov, 2011 (New Guinea)

Macratria grisescens Telnov, 2011 (Sula Islands)

Macratria guaymi Telnov, 2023 (Panama)

Macratria hatamensis Telnov, 2011 (New Guinea)

Macratria imitans Telnov, 2011 (New Guinea)

Macratria impressithorax Telnov, 2011 (New Guinea)

Macratria iridescens Telnov, 2011 (New Guinea)

Macratria jayawijaya Telnov, 2011 (New Guinea)

Macratria ketengban Telnov, 2011 (New Guinea)

Macratria koiari Telnov, 2023 (New Guinea)

Macratria kokodaensis Telnov, 2011 (New Guinea)

Macratria kopetzi Telnov, 2018 (Nepal)

Macratria korowai Telnov, 2023 (New Guinea)

Macratria kovalevskyi Telnov, 2011 (New Guinea)

Macratria kundratai Telnov, 2023 (New Guinea)

Macratria laszlowagneri Telnov, 2011 (Central Moluccas)

Macratria leprieuri gasconica Telnov, 2018 (France)

Macratria lipsbergi Telnov, 2019 (New Caledonia)

Macratria longesetosa Telnov, 2011 (New Guinea)

Macratria longitarsis Telnov, 2023 (New Guinea)

Macratria lydekkeri Telnov, 2011 (New Guinea)

Macratria magna Telnov, 2011 (New Guinea)

Macratria manfredjaechi Telnov, 2019 (New Caledonia)

Macratria marind Telnov, 2017 (S New Guinea)

Macratria maru Telnov, 2021 (The Lesser Sunda Islands: Pura)

Macratria matrozisi Telnov, 2011 (New Guinea)

Macratria maxbraclayi Telnov, 2011 (Sulawesi)

Macratria megalops Telnov, 2011 (New Guinea)

Macratria misoolensis Telnov, 2011 (New Guinea)

Macratria moluccensis Telnov, 2011 (North Moluccas)

Macratria momina Telnov, 2011 (New Guinea)

Macratria monstrosicornis Telnov, 2011 (New Guinea)

Macratria monstrosifemorata Telnov, 2011 (New Guinea)

Macratria monticola Telnov, 2011 (New Guinea)

Macratria montivaga Telnov, 2011 (Sulawesi)

Macratria mordelloides Telnov, 2011 (New Guinea)

Macratria morobensis Telnov, 2011 (New Guinea)

Macratria multisignis Telnov, 2011 (New Guinea)

Macratria nguzunguzu Telnov, 2011 (Solomon Islands)

Macratria nigricula Telnov, 2011 (New Guinea)

Macratria nigrita Telnov, 2011 (New Guinea)

Macratria nigrolateralis Telnov, 2011 (New Guinea)

Macratria nigromaculata Telnov, 2011 (New Guinea)

Macratria obiensis Telnov, 2017 (North Moluccas)

Macratria obliquesetosa Telnov, 2011 (New Guinea)

Macratria oblonga Telnov, 2011 (New Guinea)

Macratria obtusicapita Telnov, 2011 (New Guinea)

Macratria opaca Telnov, 2012 (New Guinea)

Macratria pamelaschmidti Telnov, 2011 (Solomon Islands)

Macratria patani Telnov, 2017 (North Moluccas)

Macratria parangana Telnov, 2011 (New Guinea)

Macratria perkovskyi Telnov, 2023 (New Guinea)

Macratria phallocryptus Telnov, 2011 (New Guinea)

Macratria platycephala Telnov, 2011 (New Guinea)

Macratria pluvialis Telnov, 2012 (New Guinea)

Macratria pseudodensata Telnov, 2012 (New Guinea)

Macratria pulmonaria Telnov, 2024 (Ecuador)

Macratria pumicosa Telnov, 2011 (New Guinea)

Macratria pygmaea halmaherica Telnov, 2011 (North Moluccas)

Macratria rectipilis Telnov, 2012 (New Caledonia)

Macratria riedeli Telnov, 2011 (New Guinea)

Macratria riparia Telnov, 2012 (New Guinea)

Macratria ripicola Telnov, 2023 (New Guinea)

Macratria ronaldi Telnov, 2011 (New Guinea)

Macratria roosilehti Telnov, 2023 (Sulawesi)

Macratria rotundiceps Telnov, 2011 (New Guinea)

Macratria rufula Telnov, 2011 (New Guinea)

Macratria sabahense Telnov, 2004 (Borneo)

Macratria saccharum Telnov, 2023 (New Guinea)

Macratria sanguiceps Telnov, 2011 (Sulawesi)

Macratria sentani Telnov, 2023 (New Guinea)

Macratria sepik Telnov, 2011 (New Guinea)

Macratria sola Telnov, 2002 (Afghanistan)

Macratria spathulata Telnov, 2012 (New Guinea)

Macratria spatulatocalcarata Telnov, 2023 (New Guinea)

Macratria spungisi Telnov, 2011 (New Guinea)

Macratria sulaensis Telnov, 2011 (Sula Islands)

Macratria susuami Telnov, 2023 (New Guinea)

Macratria tambopata Telnov, 2024 (Peru)

Macratria tamarau Telnov, 2012 (New Guinea)

Macratria tigrina Telnov, 2023 (New Guinea)

Macratria titiyo Telnov, 2023 (Guyana / Surinam)

Macratria tongkonan Telnov, 2023 (Sulawesi)

Macratria tricolorata Telnov, 2004 (Borneo)

Macratria trifaria Telnov, 2011 (New Guinea)

Macratria trimembris Telnov, 2012 (New Guinea)

Macratria unaensis Telnov, 2011 (New Guinea)

Macratria vandeveldei Telnov, 2011 (New Guinea)

Macratria vaturanga Telnov, 2011 (Solomon Islands)

Macratria viking Telnov, 2011 (New Guinea)

Macratria wahgi Telnov, 2011 (New Guinea)

Macratria weberi Telnov, 2011 (New Guinea)

Macratria yapena Telnov, 2011 (New Guinea)

Camelomorphini [tribe] Kirejtshuk, Azar, Telnov, 2008

Camelomorpha [genus] Kirejtshuk, Azar, Telnov, 2008

Camelomorpha longicervix Kirejtshuk, Azar, Telnov, 2008 (Lebanese amber; fossil)

Eurygeniinae

Macratriomima casuarius Telnov, 2018 (E Australia)

Macratriomima chandleri Telnov, 2018 (W Australia)

Stereopalpus succinorepertus Telnov, Alekseev, 2026 (Baltic amber; fossil)

Stereopalpus tsou Telnov, 2023 (Taiwan)

Steriphodon harensus Telnov, 2016 (United Arab Emirates)

Steriphodon ottomerkli Telnov, 2021 (Pakistan)

Telesinus discolor Telnov, 2025 (Madagascar)

Telesinus marshalli Telnov, 2016 (Madagascar)

Telesinus vittatus Telnov, 2009 (Madagascar)

Copobaeninae

Copobaenus erratus Telnov, 2024 (Chile)

Lemodes bellstedti Telnov, 2009 (New Guinea)

Lemodes bicolora Telnov, 2007 (New Guinea)

Lemodes buratea Telnov, 2007 (New Guinea)

Lemodes finisterrensis Telnov, 2009 (Papua New Guinea)

Lemodes iriana Telnov, 2007 (New Guinea)

Lemodes isatabua Telnov, 2007 (Solomon Islands)

Lemodes jayawijaya Telnov, 2009 (New Guinea)

Lemodes lauta Telnov, 2007 (New Guinea)

Lemodes nigrocaerulea Telnov, 2004 (Papua New Guinea)

Trichananca cheesmanae Telnov, 2019 (New Caledonia)

Trichananca inexpectata Telnov et Degiovanni, 2021 (Chile)

Trichananca neotropica Telnov et Degiovanni, 2021 (Chile)

Trichananca novacaledonica Telnov, 2019 (New Caledonia)

Trichananca poggii Telnov et Degiovanni, 2021 (Chile)

Steropinae

Australosteropes [genus] Telnov, 2018 (Australia)

Steropes eleticinoides Telnov, Bukejs, 2019 (Baltic amber; fossil)

Steropes hercules Telnov, 2006 (Vietnam)

Cerambycidae (Insecta: Coleoptera):

Amethysphaerion martinsi Telnov, Roosileht, 2023 (Ecuador)

Ischaliidae (Insecta: Coleoptera):

Ischalia (Eupleurida) aptera Gusakov, Telnov, 2007 (China: Sichuan)

Ischalia (E.) belousovi Telnov, 2020 (China: Yunnan)

Ischalia (E.) diancang Telnov, 2020 (China: Yunnan)

Ischalia (E.) kabaki Telnov, 2020 (China: Sichuan)

Ischalia (E.) magna Telnov, 2020 (China: Yunnan)

Ischalia (E.) tewo Telnov, 2020 (China: Gansu)

Ischalia (E.) yunnana Telnov, 2020 (China: Yunnan)

Ischalia (I.) akaishi Telnov et Barclay, 2019 (Japan)

Ischalia (I.) ancora Kazantsev et Telnov, 2019 (Vietnam)

Ischalia (I.) caerulea Telnov, 2007 (Thailand)

Ischalia (I.) dohertyi Telnov et Barclay, 2019 (W Malaysia)

Ischalia (I.) geiseri Telnov, 2020 (W Malaysia)

Ischalia (I.) holzschuhi Kazantsev et Telnov, 2019 (Laos)

Ischalia (I.) laosensis Kazantsev et Telnov, 2019 (Laos)

Ischalia (I.) microps Telnov et Barclay, 2019 (W Malaysia)

Ischalia (I.) semai Telnov et Barclay, 2019 (W Malaysia)

Ischalia (I.) similis Telnov, 2020 (W Malaysia)

Ischalia (I.) youngi Alekseev et Telnov, 2016 (Baltic amber; fossil)

Prototrichalus jingpo Telnov et Kundrata, 2023 (Myanmar amber; fossil)

Geotrupidae (Insecta: Coleoptera):

Australobolbus arfakianus Telnov, 2017 (W New Guinea)

Gilletinus kristinae Telnov, 2011 (New Guinea: Misool)

Melandryidae (Insecta: Coleoptera)

Ctenoplectron solomonis Telnov, 2024 (Solomon Islands)

Serropalpus (Sundaserropalpus Telnov, 2026) nigrovittatus Telnov, Cheong, Hwang, Barclay, Balodis & Greķe, 2026 (Singapore)

Mordellidae (Insecta: Coleoptera)

Yakutia [genus] Telnov, Perkovsky, Ruzzier et Vasilenko, 2022

Yakutia sukachevae Telnov, Perkovsky, Ruzzier et Vasilenko, 2022 (Yakutian amber; fossil)

Mycteridae (Insecta: Coleoptera)

Falsopedilus aristophanousi Gompel et Telnov, 2023 (Mozambique, Zambia)

Falsopedilus grossepunctatus Gompel et Telnov, 2023 (South Africa)

Gelesoconomorphus ekaterinae Telnov, Perkovsky, Vasilenko et Yamamoto, 2021 (Rovno amber)

Physciolagria pollocki (Telnov, 2019) (Gabon)

Physciolagria smithi Telnov, 2022 (Senegal)

Osphyidae (Insecta: Coleoptera)

Osphya geiseri Telnov et Barclay, 2026 (Belize)

Osphya maya Telnov et Barclay, 2026 (Belize)

Ptilodactylidae (Insecta: Coleoptera)

Ptilodactyla odnosum Telnov, Perkovsky, Kundrata, Bukejs, 2022 (Rovno amber)

Pyrochroidae Insecta: Coleoptera)

Serratopogonocerus succinius Telnov et Perkovsky, 2026 (Baltic amber)

Ripiphoridae (Insecta: Coleoptera)

Pelecotoides kadazandusun Gordon et Telnov, 2026 (Borneo)

Ripidius paleoslavicus Perkovsky et Telnov, 2026 (Rovno amber)

Salpingidae (Insecta: Coleoptera)

Istrisia orienthafniae Telnov et Perkovsky, 2026 (Danish amber)

Scarabaeidae (Insecta: Coleoptera)

Chariochilus tamarau Telnov, 2017 (W New Guinea)

Maechidius aiyura Telnov, 2020 (New Guinea)

Maechidius alesbezdeki Telnov, 2020 (New Guinea)

aechidius awu Telnov, 2020 (Sangihe Islands)

Maechidius babyrousa Telnov, 2020 (Sulawesi)

Maechidius bintang Telnov, 2020 (New Guinea)

Maechidius boessnecki Telnov, 2020 (Sulawesi)

Maechidius brocki Telnov, 2020 (New Guinea)

Maechidius caperatus Telnov, 2020 (New Guinea)

Maechidius ciliatus Telnov, 2020 (New Guinea)

Maechidius crypticus Telnov, 2020 (New Guinea)

Maechidius dani Telnov, 2020 (New Guinea)

Maechidius deltouri Telnov, 2020 (Sulawesi)

Maechidius dendrolagus Telnov, 2020 (New Guinea)

Maechidius hamatus Telnov, 2020 (New Guinea)

Maechidius kainantu Telnov, 2025 (New Guinea)

Maechidius kazantsevi Telnov, 2020 (Sulawesi)

Maechidius konjo Telnov, 2020 (Sulawesi)

Maechidius lapsus Telnov, 2020 (New Guinea)

Maechidius legalovi Telnov, 2020 (Sulawesi)

Maechidius leucopsar Telnov, 2020 (Bali, Lesser Sunda Islands)

Maechidius longipes Telnov, 2020 (New Guinea)

Maechidius mailu Telnov, 2020 (New Guinea)

Maechidius maleo Telnov, 2020 (Sulawesi)

Maechidius merdeka Telnov, 2020 (New Guinea)

Maechidius miklouhomaclayi Telnov, 2020 (New Guinea)

Maechidius nepenthephilus Telnov, 2020 (New Guinea)

Maechidius owenstanleyi Telnov, 2020 (New Guinea)

Maechidius riedeli Telnov, 2020 (New Guinea)

Maechidius sabatinellii Telnov, 2025 (New Guinea)

Maechidius similis Telnov, 2020 (New Guinea)

Maechidius skalei Telnov, 2020 (Sulawesi)

Maechidius sougb Telnov, 2020 (New Guinea)

Maechidius suwawa Telnov, 2020 (Sulawesi)

Maechidius trivialis Telnov, 2020 (New Guinea)

Maechidius ursus Telnov, 2020 (Raja Ampat Islands)

Maechidius weigeli Telnov, 2020 (New Guinea)

Maechidius yamdena Telnov, 2020 (Tanimbar Islands)

Scraptiidae (Insecta: Coleoptera)

Anaspidinae

Anaspis (Spanisa) solodovnikovi Telnov et Perkovsky, 2025 (Rovno amber; fossil)

Tenebrionidae (Insecta: Coleoptera)

Lagriinae

Acutogria weigeli Telnov, 2023 (New Guinea)

Arthromacra annapurna Telnov, 2024 (Nepal)

Arthromacra anoulak Telnov, 2023 (Laos)

Arthromacra distincta Telnov, 2022 (China: Yunnan)

Arthromacra olivacea Telnov, 2023 (Vietnam)

Arthromacra qiang Telnov, 2023 (China: Sichuan)

Arthromacra zhongtiao Telnov, 2022 (China: Shaanxi)

Bothrichara anggi Telnov, 2022 (New Guinea)

Bothrichara dani Telnov, 2023 (New Guinea)

Bothrichara doberai Telnov, 2023 (New Guinea)

Bothrichara grisea Telnov, 2022 (New Guinea)

Bothrichara skalei Telnov, 2023 (New Guinea)

Bothrionota anichtchenkoi Telnov & Ruzzier, 2024 (Mindanao)

Bothrionota ruzzieri Telnov, 2022 (North Moluccas: Halmahera)

Bothrionota visayas Telnov & Ruzzier, 2024 (Samar)

Bothynogria annamita Telnov, 2023 (Vietnam)

Cerogria s. l. critica Telnov, 2023 (Sulawesi)

Chlorophila hirta Telnov, 2023 (Laos, West Malaysia)

Chlorophila gemma Telnov, 2021 (China: Sichuan & Yunnan)

Donaciolagria cupreoaurata Telnov, 2022 (China: Yunnan)

Donaciolagria evanescens Telnov, 2022 (China: Yunnan)

Donaciolagria mimica Telnov, 2022 (China: Hubei, Shaanxi, Sichuan)

Donaciolagria regia Telnov, 2022 (India: Arunachal Pradesh)

Donaciolagria rubida Telnov, 2023 (China: Sichuan)

Donaciolagria weigeli Telnov, 2022 (China: Yunnan)

Exostira transmontana Telnov, 2022 (China: Yunnan, India: Arunachal Pradesh, Myanmar)

Gronophora jayawijaya Telnov, 2025 (New Guinea)

Gronophora nigronitida Telnov, 2025 (New Guinea)

Gronophora riedeli Telnov, 2025 (New Guinea)

Kaindilagria opposita Telnov, 2022 (New Guinea)

Lagria arfaka Telnov, 2024 (New Guinea)

Lagria hatam Telnov, 2024 (New Guinea)

Lagria maoke Telnov, 2025 (New Guinea)

Lagria undulata Telnov, 2024 (New Guinea)

Macrocasnonidea bifurcata Telnov, 2022 (East Malaysia: Sarawak)

Oreogria arfak Telnov, 2022 (New Guinea)

Sora danica Telnov & Perkovsky, 2026 (Danish amber; fossil)

Sora gurung Telnov, 2025 (Nepal)

Statira baltica Telnov, Bukejs, Merkl, 2019 (Baltic amber)

Gonialaenini [tribe] Nabozhenko, Bukejs, Telnov, 2019

Gonialaena [genus] Nabozhenko, Bukejs, Telnov, 2019

Gonialaena groehni Nabozhenko, Bukejs, Telnov, 2019

Xenocerogria koteka Telnov, 2023 (New Guinea)

Stenochiinae

Androsus arfakianus Telnov, 2025 (New Guinea)

Androsus marind Telnov, 2025 (New Guinea)

Androsus tandai Telnov, 2025 (Solomon Islands)

Strongylium bidens Telnov & Masumoto, 2024 (Sulawesi)

Strongylium callainum Telnov & Masumoto, 2024 (Sulawesi)

Strongylium gawu Telnov & Masumoto, 2024 (Sulawesi)

Strongylium napolovi Telnov & Masumoto, 2024 (Sulawesi)

Strongylium rufocaeruleum Telnov & Masumoto, 2024 (Sulawesi)

Strongylium suwawa Telnov & Masumoto, 2024 (Sulawesi)

Strongylium tandai Telnov, 2024 (Solomon Islands)

Tenebrioninae

Amarygmus marau Telnov, 2025 (Solomon Islands: Guadalcanal)

Boletoxenus mixtus dynastes Telnov, 2023 (Peninsular Malaysia)

Boletoxenus papuanus Mislai & Telnov, 2026 (New Guinea)

Byrsax crypticus Telnov, 2023 (Solomon Islands)

Byrsax titanus Telnov, 2026 (New Guinea & Raja Ampat Archipelago)

Trictenotomidae (Insecta: Coleoptera)

Autocrates lini Hu, Drumont & Telnov, 2022 (China: Guangxi)

Trictenotoma boudanti Drumont et Telnov, 2021 (The Philippines: Balabac & Palawan)

Trictenotoma pollocki Drumont et Telnov, 2020 (Vietnam)

Heteroptera

Naucoridae

Tanycricos cyclops Telnov et D. Polhemus, 2021 (New Guinea)

== Bibliography ==
Telnov has co-authored more than 190 scientific publications, among them include several monographs, books, book chapters and numerous journal articles, such as:

=== Books ===
Chandler D.S., Uhmann G., Nardi G., Telnov D. 2008. Family Anthicidae Latreille, 1819: 421–455. In: Löbl I. & Smetana A. (editors) Catalogue of Palaearctic Coleoptera. 5. Apollo Books, Stenstrup: 670 pp.

Telnov D. 2004. Check-List of Latvian Beetles (Insecta: Coleoptera). In: Telnov D. (editor) Compendium of Latvian Coleoptera, volume 1. Rīga, the Entomological Society of Latvia: 114 pp.

Telnov D., Barclay M.V.L., Pauwels O.S.G. (editors) 2017. Biodiversity, biogeography and nature conservation in Wallacea and New Guinea. Volume III. Rīga, the Entomological Society of Latvia: 658 pp, 172 pls.

Telnov D., Barclay M.V.L., Pauwels O.S.G. (editors) 2021. Biodiversity, biogeography and nature conservation in Wallacea and New Guinea. Volume IV. Rīga, the Entomological Society of Latvia: 443 pp.

Telnov D. (editor) 2014. Biodiversity, biogeography and nature conservation in Wallacea and New Guinea. Volume II. Rīga, the Entomological Society of Latvia: 458 pp, 126 pls.

Telnov D. (editor) 2011. Biodiversity, biogeography and nature conservation in Wallacea and New Guinea. Volume I. Rīga, The Entomological Society of Latvia: 434 pp + 92 pls.

Telnov D. 2020. Family Anthicidae Latreille, 1819: 575–625. In: Iwan D. & Löbl I. (eds) Catalogue of Palaearctic Coleoptera. Volume 5. Revised and Updated Second Edition. Tenebrionoidea. Brill, Leiden & Boston: 945 pp.

=== Periodicals ===
Telnov D. 2020. A revision of the Maechidiini Burmeister, 1855 (Coleoptera: Scarabaeidae: Melolonthinae) from the Indo-Australian transition zone, and the first record of the tribe west of Wallace's Line. – European Journal of Taxonomy 721: 1–210.

Goczał J., Oleksa A., Rossa R., Chybicki I., Meyza K., Plewa R., Landvik M., Gobbi M., Hoch G., Tamutis V., Balalaikins M., Telnov D., Dascălu M.-M., Tofilski A. 2020. Climatic oscillations in Quaternary have shaped the co‑evolutionary patterns between the Norway spruce and its host‑associated herbivore. – Scientific Reports 10: 16524.

Telnov D., Kazantsev S.V. 2017. A mimetic assemblage of net-winged beetles (Coleoptera: Lycidae) from West Papua: 363–370, pls 56–61. In: Telnov D., Barclay M.V.L., Pauwels O.S.G. (eds) Biodiversity, biogeography and nature conservation in Wallacea and New Guinea. Volume III. Rīga, the Entomological Society of Latvia: 658 pp, 172 pls.

Telnov D. 2014. Taxonomic revision of the genus Sapintus Casey, 1895 (Coleoptera: Anthicidae: Anthicinae) from the Indo-Australian transition zone, with remarks on some Oriental and Australian taxa: 255–344, pls 44–63. In: Telnov D. (ed.) Biodiversity, biogeography and nature conservation in Wallacea and New Guinea. Volume II. Rīga, the Entomological Society of Latvia: 458 pp, 126 pls.

Greķe K., Telnov D. 2014. Review and assessment of the literature on recent non-marine molluscs of the Papuan biogeographical region: 61–112. In: Telnov D. (ed.) Biodiversity, biogeography and nature conservation in Wallacea and New Guinea. Volume II. Rīga, the Entomological Society of Latvia: 458 pp, 126 pls.

Telnov D., Matrozis R. 2012. Cultural heritage at the service of nature conservation. Osmoderma barnabita Motschulsky, 1845 (Coleoptera: Scarabaeidae) migration corridor in Rīga, Latvia. – Latvijas entomologs 51: 63–79.

Telnov D. 2011. Taxonomische Revision der Gattung Macratria Newman, 1838 (Coleoptera: Anthicidae: Macratriinae) aus Wallacea, Neuguinea und den Salomonen: 97-285, pls 17–37. In: Telnov D. (ed.) Biodiversity, Biogeography and Nature Conservation in Wallacea and New Guinea. Rīga, The Entomological Society of Latvia: 434 pp + 92 pls.

Harvey D.J., Gange A.C., Haves C.J., Rink M., Abdehalden M., Al Fulaij N., Asp T., Ballerio A., Bartolozzi L., Brustel H., Cammaerts R., Carpaneto G.M., Cederberg B., Chobot K., Cianferoni F., Drumont A., Ellwanger G., Ferreira S., Grosso-Silva J.M., Gueorguiev B., Harvey W., Hendriks P., Istrate P., Jansson N., Jelaska L.Š., Jendek E., JovićM., Kervyn T., Krenn H.W., Kretschmer K., Legakis A., Lelo S., Moretti M., Merkl O., Palma R.M., Neculiseanu Z., Rabitsch W., Rodríguez S.M., Smit J.T., Smith M., Sprecher-Uebersax E., Telnov D., Thomaes A., Thomsen P.F., Tykarski P., Vrezec A., Werner S., Zach P. 2011. Bionomics and distribution of the stag beetle, Lucanus cervus (L.) Across Europe. – Insect Conservation and Diversity 4: 23–38.

Telnov D. 2010. Ant-like flower beetles (Coleoptera: Anthicidae) of the UK, Ireland and Channel Isles. – British Journal of Entomology and Natural History 23: 99–117, 3 pls.

Pollock D., Telnov D. 2010. 11.22. Trictenotomidae Blanchard, 1845. In: Leschen R.A.B., Beutel R.G., Lawrence J.F. (eds) Coleoptera, Beetles. Volume 2: Morphology and Systematics (Elateroidea, Bostrichiformia, Cucujiformia partim). Arthropoda Insecta. Handbook of Zoology. De Gruyter, Berlin & New York: 704–708.

Telnov D. 2009. Species of Anthicomorphus Lewis, 1895 (Coleoptera: Anthicidae) from the Indo-Australian transition zone (Wallacea), with comments on selected taxa from adjacent areas. – Vernate 28: 377–408.

Telnov D. 2007. Redefinition of Pseudoleptaleus Pic, 1900 (Coleoptera: Anthicidae, Anthicinae). – Entomologische Zeitschrift 117, No. 2: 71–82.

Telnov D. 2007. A review of the genus Lemodes Boheman, 1858 (Coleoptera: Anthicidae: Lemodinae). – Veröffentlichungen des Naturkundemuseums Erfurt 26: 241–258.

Ranius T., Aguado L.O., Antonsson K., Audisio P., Ballerio A., Carpaneto G.M., Chobot K., Gjurašin B., Hanssen O., Huijbregts H., Lakatos F., Martin O., Neculiseanu Z., Nikitsky N.B., Paill W., Prinat A., Rizun V., Ruicănescu A., Stegner J., Süda I., Szwałko P., Tamutis V., Telnov D., Tsinkevich V., Verstreit V., Vignon V., Vögeli M., Zach P. 2005. Osmoderma eremita (Coleoptera, Scarabaeidae, Cetoniinae) in Europe. – Animal Biodiversity and Conservation 28.1: 1-44.

Chandler D.S., Nardi G., Telnov D. 2004. Nomenclatural notes on the Palaearctic Anthicidae (Coleoptera). – Mitteilungen des Internationalen Entomologischen Vereins e.V. 29, No. 4: 109–173.

== Personal life ==
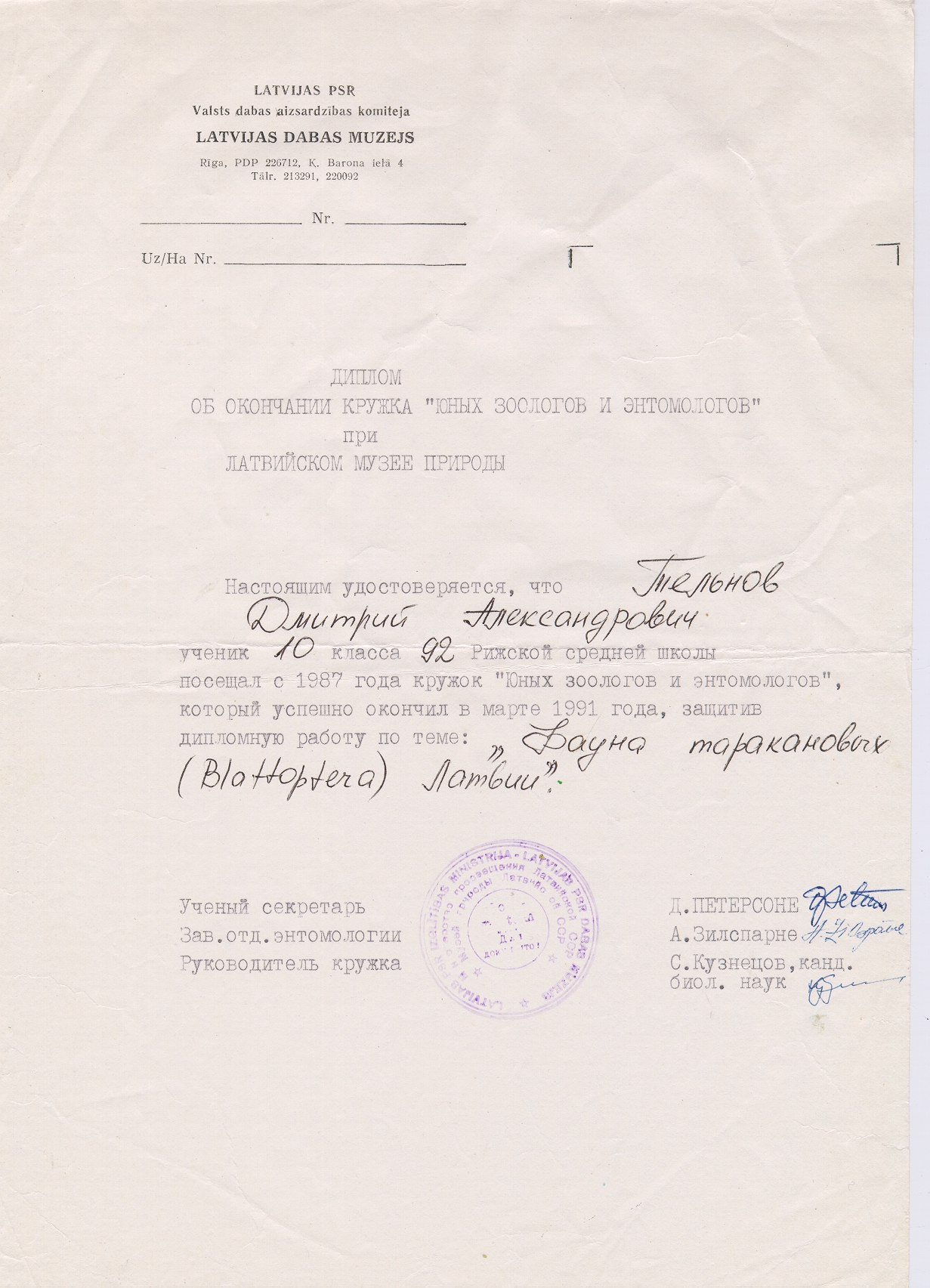
The Latvian Natural History Museum diploma for Dmitry Telnov (in Russian).

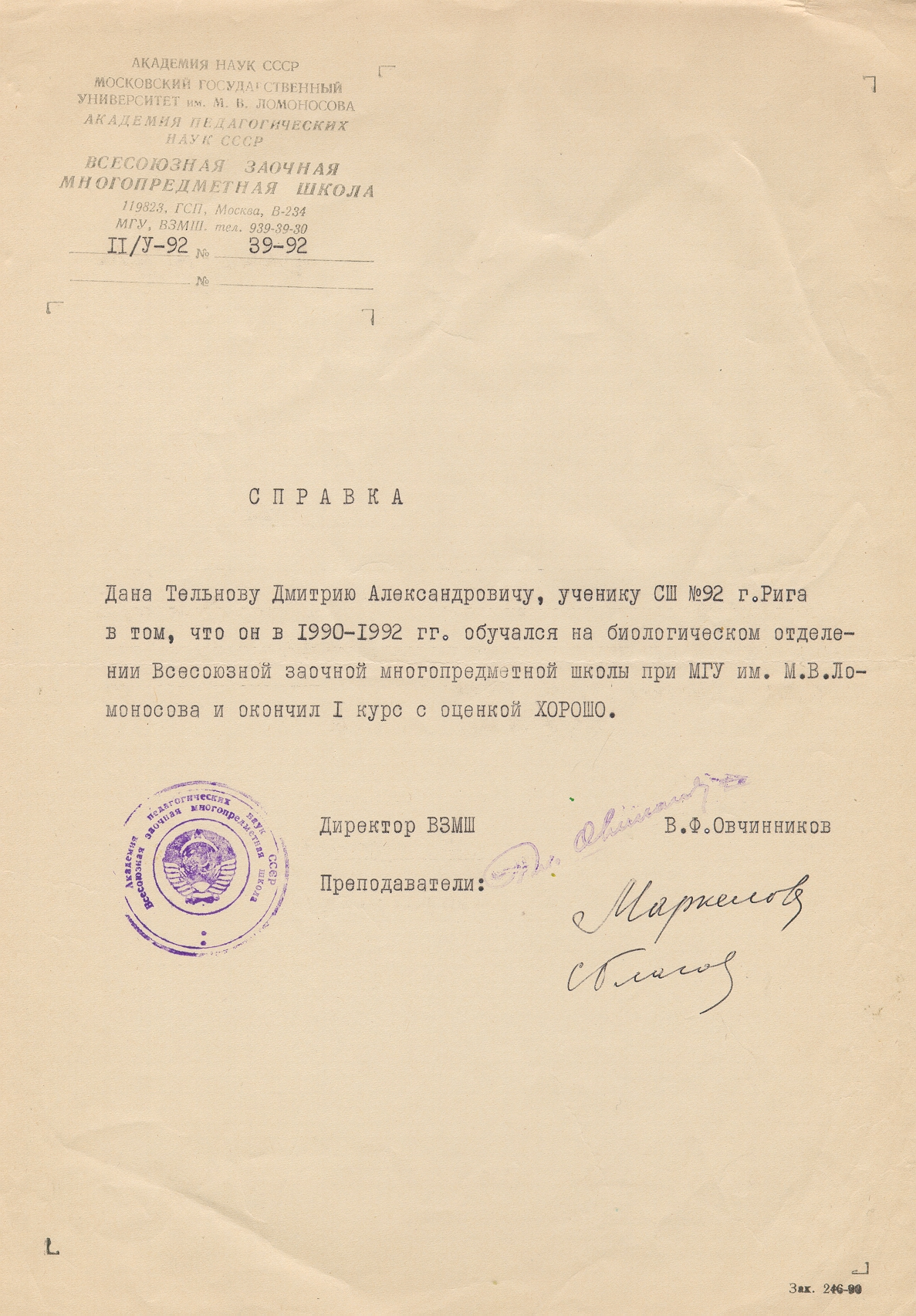
The Moscow State University reference for Dmitry Telnov (in Russian).

Telnov is married and has children. As a teenager he worked as a volunteer at the Riga Zoo insectarium and was strongly influenced by works of Gerald Durrell and David Attenborough. During his school days, he visited courses for young zoologists and entomologists (1987-1991) at the Latvian Natural History Museum and distantly studied biology (1990-1992) at the Lomonosov Moscow State University's Multidisciplinary distant school. Tropical ecology, evolutionary biology and anthropology (especially of recent indigenous societies and their languages) which are his hobby interests.
