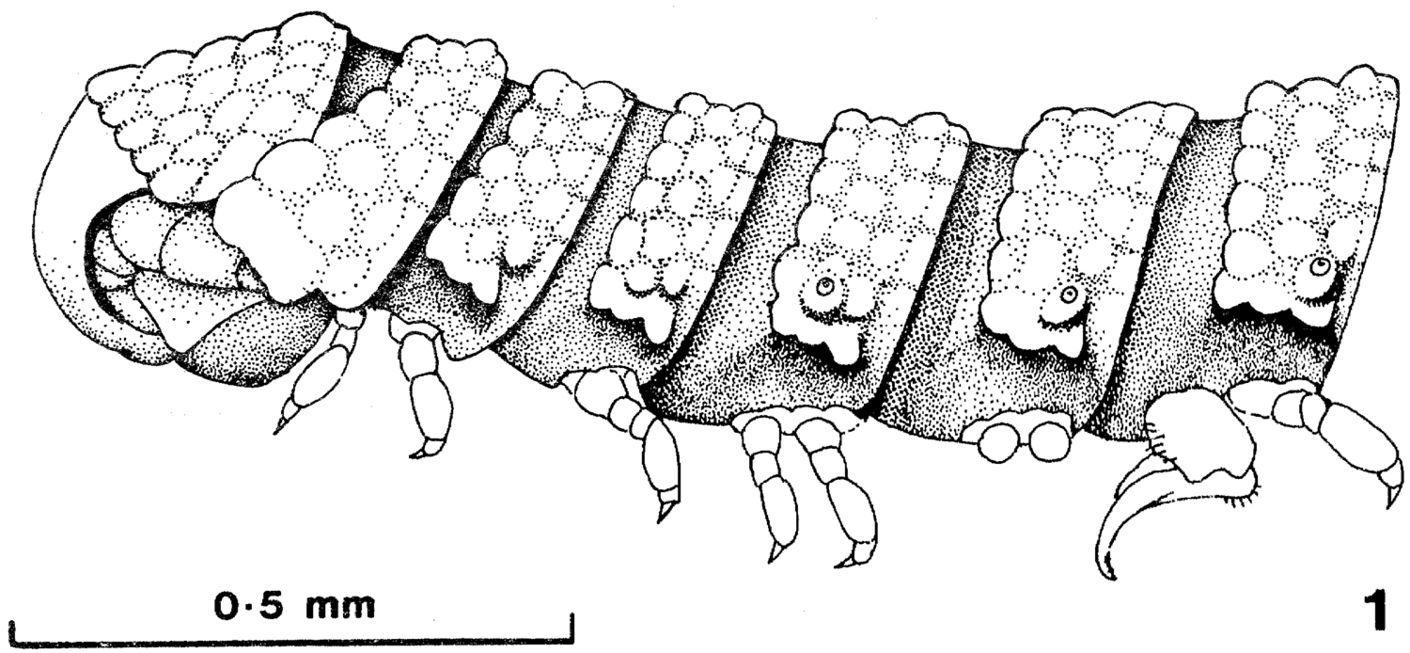

Scientific classification
- Kingdom: Animalia
- Phylum: Arthropoda
- Subphylum: Myriapoda
- Class: Diplopoda
- Order: Polydesmida
- Family: Haplodesmidae
- Genus: Prosopodesmus
- Species: P. panporus

Binomial name
- Prosopodesmus panporus Blower & Rundle, 1980

= Prosopodesmus panporus =

Species of millipede

Prosopodesmus panporus is a species of flat-backed millipede in the family Haplodesmidae. Also known as the hothouse millipede, this species was first discovered in hothouses for tropical plants in England, where it is well established, but is probably native to Australia. This species features a unique distribution of ozopores, which appear on all segments with two pairs of legs. The species P. panporus is named for this complete series of ozopores and is the only species in the order Polydesmida with this distribution. This millipede is also notable for exhibiting sexual dimorphism in segment number: Whereas adult females of this species feature the 20 segments usually observed in the order Polydesmida (counting the collum as the first segment and the telson as the last), the adult males of this species feature only 19 segments.

== Discovery and distribution ==
This species was first described in 1980 by the British myriapodologist John Gordon Blower and Adrian J. Rundle. They based the original description of this species on several specimens collected by Rundle from four hothouses in Kew Gardens in England. Rundle found these specimens in 1975 and 1976 in the course of a survey of the fauna of Kew Gardens. The type specimens include a male holotype and several paratypes, including both sexes and multiple juveniles as well as adults. The holotype and most of the paratypes are deposited in the Natural History Museum in London.

Blower and Rundle inferred that this species had been introduced from some tropical habitat overseas. The geographic origin of this species, however, remained a mystery until 2012, when the zoologist Robert Mesibov reported the discovery of P. panporus specimens in a remote tropical rainforest in Australia. These specimens include 24 males and five females collected in 1986 from rainforest litter on the Cape York peninsula of Queensland in Australia. Both the remote location of this site and the discovery of other Prosopodesmus species in the tropical rainforests of north Queensland indicate that P. panporus is native to Queensland.

== Description ==
This millipede is cream white with almost no pigment. The head is nearly completely covered by the collum, which is shaped like a fan. The gonopods are simple and end with several prominent teeth on the lateral edge, one apical and four or five near the tip. This species is among the smallest millipedes known: The adult males range from 3.3 to 3.8 mm in length and from 0.45 to 0.50 mm in breadth; the adult females range from 3.8 to 4.3 mm in length and from 0.50 to 0.51 mm in breadth.

Adult females of this species have the 20 segments (including the telson) typically observed among flat-backed millipedes, but adult males feature only 19 segments. Blower and Rundle studied a sample of juveniles including all stages of post-embryonic development and found that this species goes through the same stages of teloanamorphosis usually observed in the order Polydesmida, except males mature and stop molting one stage earlier. Thus, whereas females emerge as adults in the eighth stage with the usual 20 segments and 31 pairs of legs, the males emerge as adults in the seventh stage with only 19 segments and 28 leg pairs (excluding the eighth pair, which become gonopods).

The dorsal surface of each segment is paved with tubercles. The collum features five rows of tubercles, but the other segments each feature three rows of tubercles on strongly arched tergites. The telson also has three rows of tubercles, with twelve tubercles overhanging the posterior edge of the telson as six lobes on each side.

This species features a unique distribution of ozopores, which appear on each segment with two leg pairs. Thus, adult females have ozopores on segments 5 through 18, and adult males have ozopores on segments 5 through 17. The legless penultimate segment in front of the telson (segment 19 in adult females, segment 18 in adult males) also features a rudimentary pair of ozopores. Each pair of ozopores appears on the outermost pair of tubercles, in the second row of the fifth segment and in the third row of the other segments.

This millipede shares many features with other Prosopodesmus species, including the general form of the body, the fan-shaped collum covering the head from above, three rows of tubercles on the dorsal surface of the segments, and simple gonopods. This species may be distinguished from its close relatives, however, by its unique series of ozopores and the number of segments in adult males. For example, although P. panporus resembles the Prosopodesmus type species P. jacobsoni in many respects, the type species features 20 segments in both sexes. Furthermore, although P. jacobsoni also features an unusually extensive series of ozopores (on segment 5 and segments 7 through 19), P. panporus also features ozopores on segment 6 and merely rudimentary ozopores on the legless penultimate segment.

The species P. jacobsoni also differs from P. panporus in other respects. For example, P. jacobsoni is larger (6.0 mm long and 0.71 mm wide), is red-brown rather than cream white, and has ten lobes rather than twelve on the posterior edge of the telson. Moreover, the gonopods of P. jacobsoni feature not only a large lateral lamella that is absent in P. panporus but also only two teeth near the tip where P. panporus features four or five teeth. Finally, where the three rows of tubercles feature tubercles of equal size in P. panporus, the first row has the largest tubercles and the third row the smallest tubercles in P. jacobsoni.
