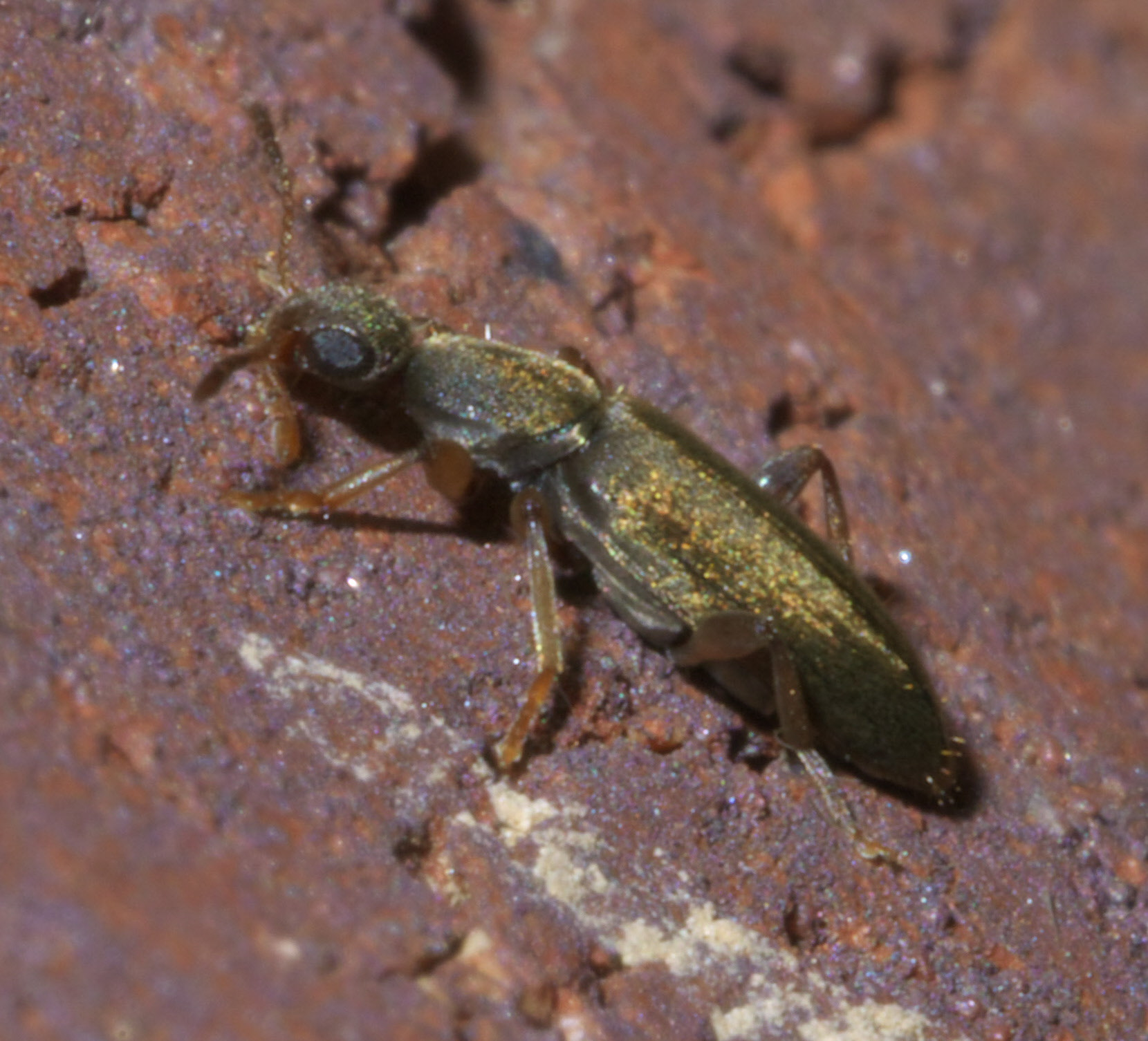
- Macratria murina

Scientific classification
- Kingdom: Animalia
- Phylum: Arthropoda
- Class: Insecta
- Order: Coleoptera
- Suborder: Polyphaga
- Infraorder: Cucujiformia
- Family: Anthicidae
- Subfamily: Macratriinae; LeConte, 1862

Tribes
- Macratriini LeConte, 1862; † Camelomorphini Kirejtshuk & Azar, 2008

= Macratriinae =

Subfamily of beetles

Macratriinae is a subfamily of antlike flower beetles in the family Anthicidae. There are at least 2 genera and more than 30 described species in Macratriinae.

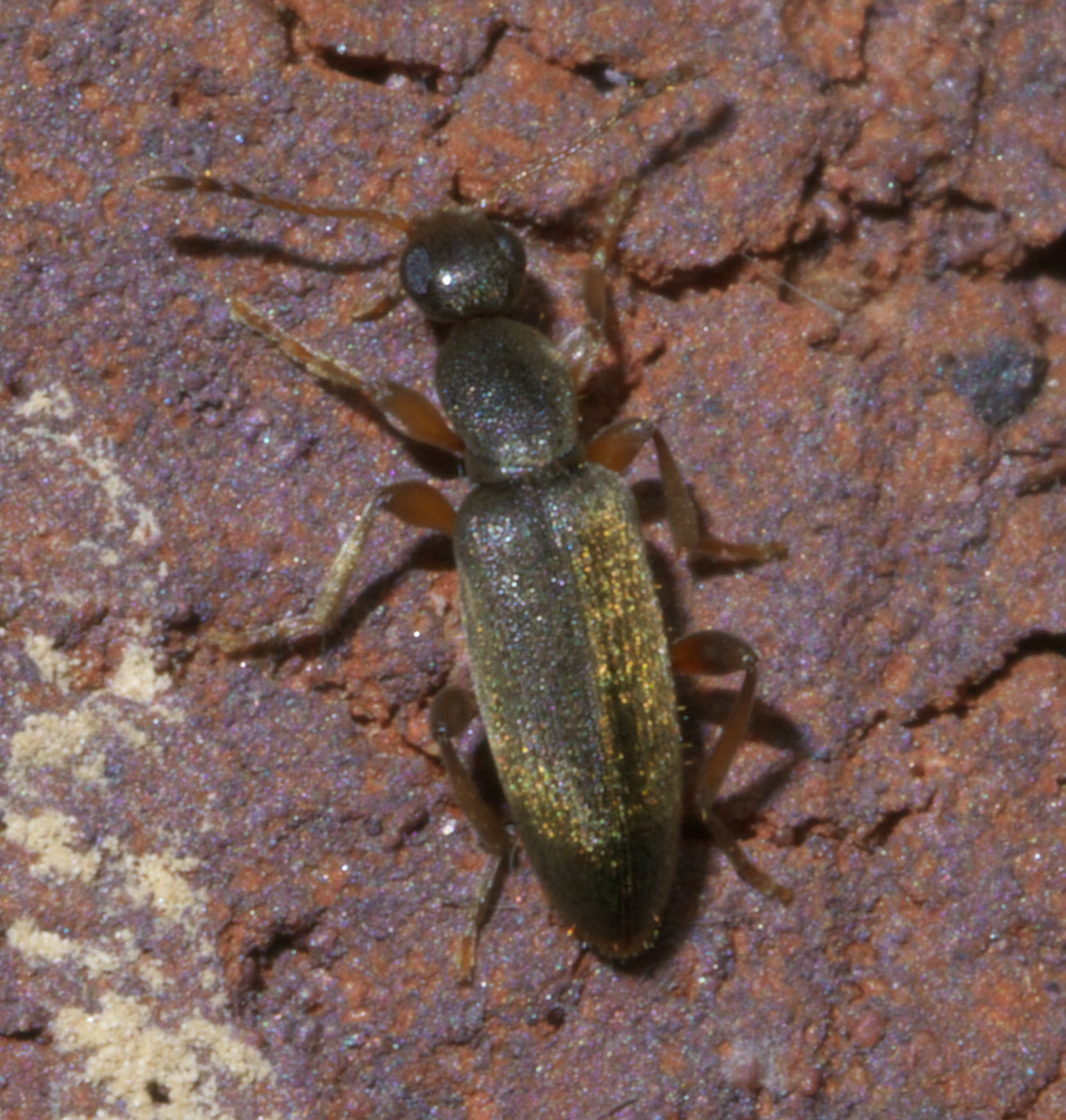
Macratria murina

== Genera ==
These two genera belong to the subfamily Macratriinae:

- Macratria Newman, 1838
- Thambospasta Werner, 1974
