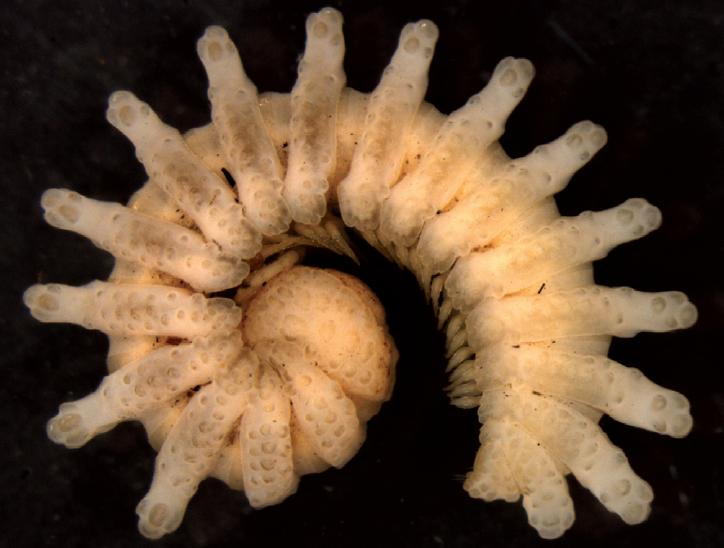
- Eutrichodesmus aster

Scientific classification
- Kingdom: Animalia
- Phylum: Arthropoda
- Subphylum: Myriapoda
- Class: Diplopoda
- Order: Polydesmida
- Suborder: Polydesmidea
- Infraorder: Polydesmoides
- Superfamily: Haplodesmoidea; Cook, 1895
- Family: Haplodesmidae; Cook, 1895

Genera
- See text

Synonyms
- Doratodesmidae Cook, 1896

= Haplodesmidae =

Family of millipedes

Haplodesmidae is a family of millipedes in the order Polydesmida. This family includes more than 70 species. Species occur in East Asia, Southeast Asia, and Oceania, although some species have been introduced to the New world tropics.

== Description ==
Species in this family are small, usually less than 10 mm in length. The tergites are always very convex, often with elaborate sculpturing in the form of two to four transverse rows of tubercles. Many species are capable of volvation (rolling into a near-complete ball), but some are not. The ozopores appear on the dorsal surface of the paranota. The sterna are so narrow that the walking legs are contiguous where they emerge from the body. The gonopods emerge from an aperture that is relatively modest in size and shaped like a transverse oval. Species in this family hold their gonopods parallel to the main axis of the body in a considerable hollow in the middle of the ventral surface. The gonopods do not cross, even at the distal end.

== Segmentation ==
This family includes some species that feature unusual deviations from the 20 segments (including the telson) normally observed in the order Polydesmida. For example, some species exhibit sexual dimorphism in segments number, including not only Prosopodesmus panporus and Eutrichodesmus peculiaris (adult females with the usual 20 segments, but adult males with only 19) but also Doratodesmus pholeter (adults females with 19 segments, adult males with 18). This family also includes two species notable for being among the few species in Polydesmida to feature only 18 segments in adults (both sexes in D. hispidus and males only in D. pholeter). Species arrive at these lower numbers of segments by going through the same stages of teloanamorphosis observed in other polydesmids but reaching maturity one moult earlier for 19 segments or two moults earlier for 18 segments.

== Genera ==
The family Haplodesmidae includes the following genera:

- Agathodesmus
- Cylindrodesmus
- Doratodesmus
- Eutrichodesmus
- Helodesmus
- Hypsiloporus
- Inodesmus
- Koponenius
- Nanocondylodesmus
- Prosopodesmus
