= List of Anthicus species =

This is a list of 109 species in Anthicus, a genus of antlike flower beetles in the family Anthicidae.

== Anthicus species ==
- Anthicus ancilla Casey, 1895^{i c g}
- Anthicus angustatus Curtis, 1838^{g}
- Anthicus antherinus (Linnaeus, 1761)^{g}
- Anthicus antilleorum Werner, 1983^{i c g}
- Anthicus antiochensis Werner, 1975^{i c g}
- Anthicus armatus Truqui, 1855^{g}
- Anthicus ater (Panzer, 1796)^{g}
- Anthicus axillaris Schmidt, 1842^{g}
- Anthicus balachanus Pic, 1906^{g}
- Anthicus barbatus Werner, 1964^{i c g}
- Anthicus basimacula Champion, 1890^{i c g}
- Anthicus basithorax Pic, 1941^{g}
- Anthicus bellulus LeConte, 1851^{i c g}
- Anthicus biguttatus La Ferté-Sénectère, 1849^{g}
- Anthicus biguttulus LeConte, 1851^{i c g b}
- Anthicus bimaculatus (Illiger, 1801)^{g}
- Anthicus brunneipennis Pic, 1896^{g}
- Anthicus brunneus La Ferté-Sénectère, 1949^{g}
- Anthicus catalanus Bonadona, 1953^{g}
- Anthicus cervinus LaFerté-Sénectère, 1849^{i c g b} (cloudy flower beetle)
- Anthicus comanche Werner, 1964^{i c g}
- Anthicus concinnus LaFerté, 1848^{g}
- Anthicus constellatus Krekich-Strassoldo, 1928^{g}
- Anthicus coracinus LeConte, 1852^{i c g}
- Anthicus cribratus LeConte, 1851^{i c g}
- Anthicus cribripennis Desbrochers des Loges, 1875^{g}
- Anthicus crinitus LaFerté-Sénectère, 1848^{i c g}
- Anthicus custodiae Werner, 1964^{i c g}
- Anthicus cylindricus Pic, 1899^{g}
- Anthicus czernohorskyi Pic, 1912^{g}
- Anthicus difformis De Marseul, 1879^{g}
- Anthicus dilaticollis Champion, 1890^{i c g b}
- Anthicus diversepunctatus Pic, 1913^{g}
- Anthicus diversus De Marseul, 1879^{g}
- Anthicus dravidiacus ^{g}
- Anthicus ephippium LaFerté-Sénectère, 1849^{i c g b}
- Anthicus escorialensis Pic, 1893^{g}
- Anthicus falli Werner, 1964^{i c g}
- Anthicus fenestratus W.L.E.Schmidt, 1842^{g}
- Anthicus flavicans LeConte, 1852^{i c g b}
- Anthicus flavipes (Panzer, 1797)^{g}
- Anthicus floralis (Linnaeus, 1758) – Narrownecked grain beetle
- Anthicus fumosus Lucas, 1843^{g}
- Anthicus fuscicornis La Ferté-Sénectère, 1849^{g}
- Anthicus genei La Ferté-Sénectère, 1849^{g}
- Anthicus gratiosus Pic, 1896^{g}
- Anthicus guttifer Wollaston, 1864^{g}
- Anthicus guyanensis Pic, 1904^{g}
- Anthicus haldemani LeConte, 1852^{i c g b}
- Anthicus hamicornis De Marseul, 1880^{g}
- Anthicus hastatus Casey, 1895^{i c g b}
- Anthicus heroicus Casey, 1895^{i c g b}
- Anthicus horridus LeConte, 1851^{i c g}
- Anthicus humeralis Gebler, 1841^{g}
- Anthicus ictericus LaFerté-Sénectère, 1849^{i c g b}
- Anthicus inaequalis Marseul, 1879^{g}
- Anthicus inderiensis De Marseul, 1879^{g}
- Anthicus insularis Werner, 1965^{i c g}
- Anthicus invreai Koch, 1933^{g}
- Anthicus korbi Pic, 1902^{g}
- Anthicus laeviceps Baudi di Selve, 1877^{g}
- Anthicus lapidosus Wollaston, 1864^{g}
- Anthicus latefasciatus Desbrochers des Loges, 1875^{g}
- Anthicus lecontei Champion, 1890^{i c g b}
- Anthicus leveillei Pic, 1893^{g}
- Anthicus lubbockii Wollaston, 1857^{g}
- Anthicus luteicornis Schmidt, 1842^{g}
- Anthicus lutulentus Casey, 1895^{i c g b}
- Anthicus macrocephalus Champion, 1890^{i c g}
- Anthicus maritimus LeConte, 1851^{i c g b}
- Anthicus melancholicus LaFerté-Sénectère, 1849^{i c g b}
- Anthicus militaris Casey, 1895^{i c g}
- Anthicus monsonicus ^{g}
- Anthicus monstrosicornis Marseul, 1876^{g}
- Anthicus musculus Werner, 1975^{i c g}
- Anthicus nanus LeConte, 1851^{i c g b}
- Anthicus niger (Olivier, 1811)^{g}
- Anthicus nigritus Mannerheim, 1853^{i c g}
- Anthicus obscurellus LeConte, 1851^{i c g}
- Anthicus oculatus Paykull, 1798^{g}
- Anthicus ophthalmicus Rottenberg, 1871^{g}
- Anthicus plectrinus Casey, 1904^{i c g}
- Anthicus pliginskyi (Telnov, 2004)^{g}
- Anthicus praeceps Casey, 1895^{i c g}
- Anthicus proximus De Marseul, 1879^{g}
- Anthicus punctulatus LeConte, 1851^{i c g b}
- Anthicus quadridecoratus Abeille de Perrin, 1885^{g}
- Anthicus quadrilunatus LaFerté-Sénectère, 1849^{i c g}
- Anthicus quadrioculatus La Ferté-Sénectère, 1849^{g}
- Anthicus recens Werner, 1966^{i c g}
- Anthicus rufivestis Marseul, 1879^{g}
- Anthicus rufulus LeConte, 1852^{i c g b}
- Anthicus sabulosus De Marseul, 1879^{g}
- Anthicus sacramento Chandler, 1978^{i c g} – Sacramento beetle
- Anthicus sauteri Pic, 1913^{g}
- Anthicus scabriceps LeConte, 1850^{i c g b}
- Anthicus schmidtii Rosenhauer, 1847^{g}
- Anthicus scurrula Truqui, 1855^{g}
- Anthicus semicupreus Pic, 1893^{g}
- Anthicus sivaschensis Blinstein, 1988^{g}
- Anthicus sonoranus Werner, 1964^{i c g}
- Anthicus subtilis Gistel, 1831^{g}
- Anthicus theryi Pic, 1892^{g}
- Anthicus thomasi Pic, 1896^{i c g}
- Anthicus thyreocephalus Solsky, 1867^{g}
- Anthicus tristis Schmidt, 1842^{g}
- Anthicus troglodytes Boheman, 1858^{g}
- Anthicus umbrinus LaFerté-Sénectère, 1848^{g}
- Anthicus vexator Werner, 1965^{i c g}
- Anthicus virginiae (Casey, 1895)^{i c g}

Data sources: i = ITIS, c = Catalogue of Life, g = GBIF, b = Bugguide.net
