= Anthicus hastatus =

Scientific classification
- Kingdom: Animalia
- Phylum: Arthropoda
- Class: Insecta
- Order: Coleoptera
- Suborder: Polyphaga
- Infraorder: Cucujiformia
- Family: Anthicidae
- Genus: Anthicus
- Species: A. hastatus

Binomial name
- Anthicus hastatus Casey, 1895

Synonyms
- Anthicus solidus Casey, 1895; Anthicus subcalvus Casey, 1895

Species of beetle

Anthicus hastatus is a species of antlike flower beetle in the family Anthicidae. It is found in North America.
