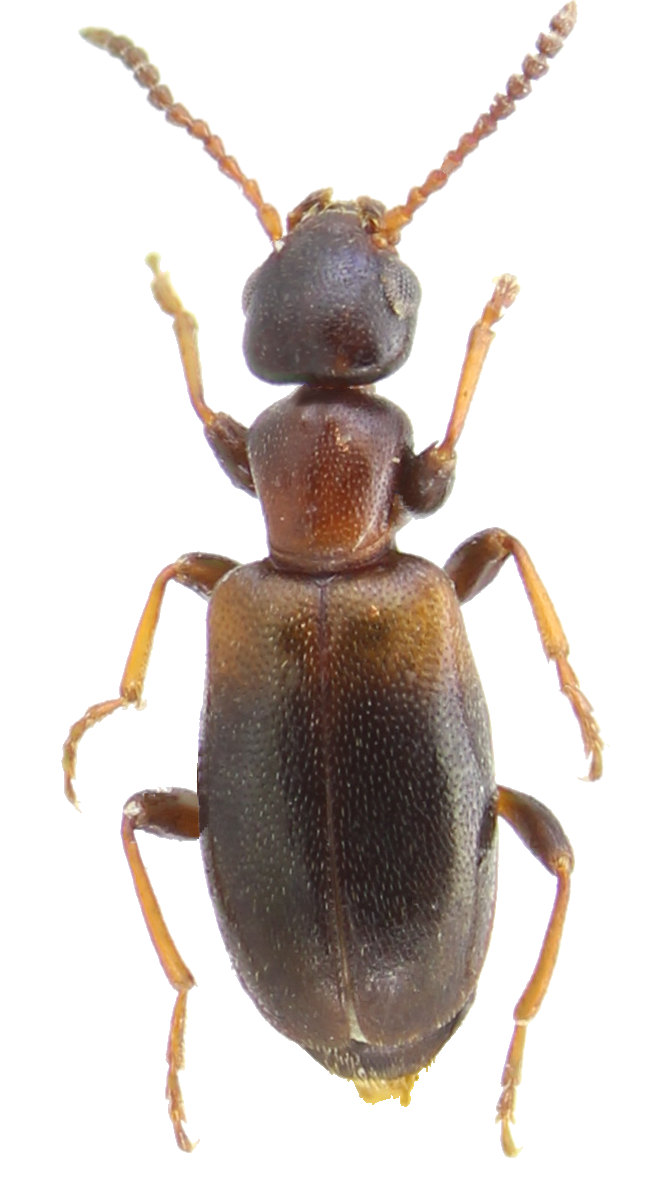

Scientific classification
- Kingdom: Animalia
- Phylum: Arthropoda
- Class: Insecta
- Order: Coleoptera
- Suborder: Polyphaga
- Infraorder: Cucujiformia
- Family: Anthicidae
- Genus: Anthicus
- Species: A. floralis

Binomial name
- Anthicus floralis (Linnaeus, 1758)

= Anthicus floralis =

Narrownecked Grain Beetle

Species of beetle

Anthicus floralis, the narrownecked grain beetle, is a beetle species in the family Anthicidae.
