= Notoxus nuperus =

Scientific classification
- Domain: Eukaryota
- Kingdom: Animalia
- Phylum: Arthropoda
- Class: Insecta
- Order: Coleoptera
- Suborder: Polyphaga
- Infraorder: Cucujiformia
- Family: Anthicidae
- Genus: Notoxus
- Species: N. nuperus

Binomial name
- Notoxus nuperus Horn, 1884

Species of beetle

Notoxus nuperus is a species of monoceros beetle in the family Anthicidae. It is found in Central America and North America.

== Subspecies ==
These two subspecies belong to the species Notoxus nuperus:

- Notoxus nuperus haustrus Chandler, 1978
- Notoxus nuperus nuperus Horn, 1884
