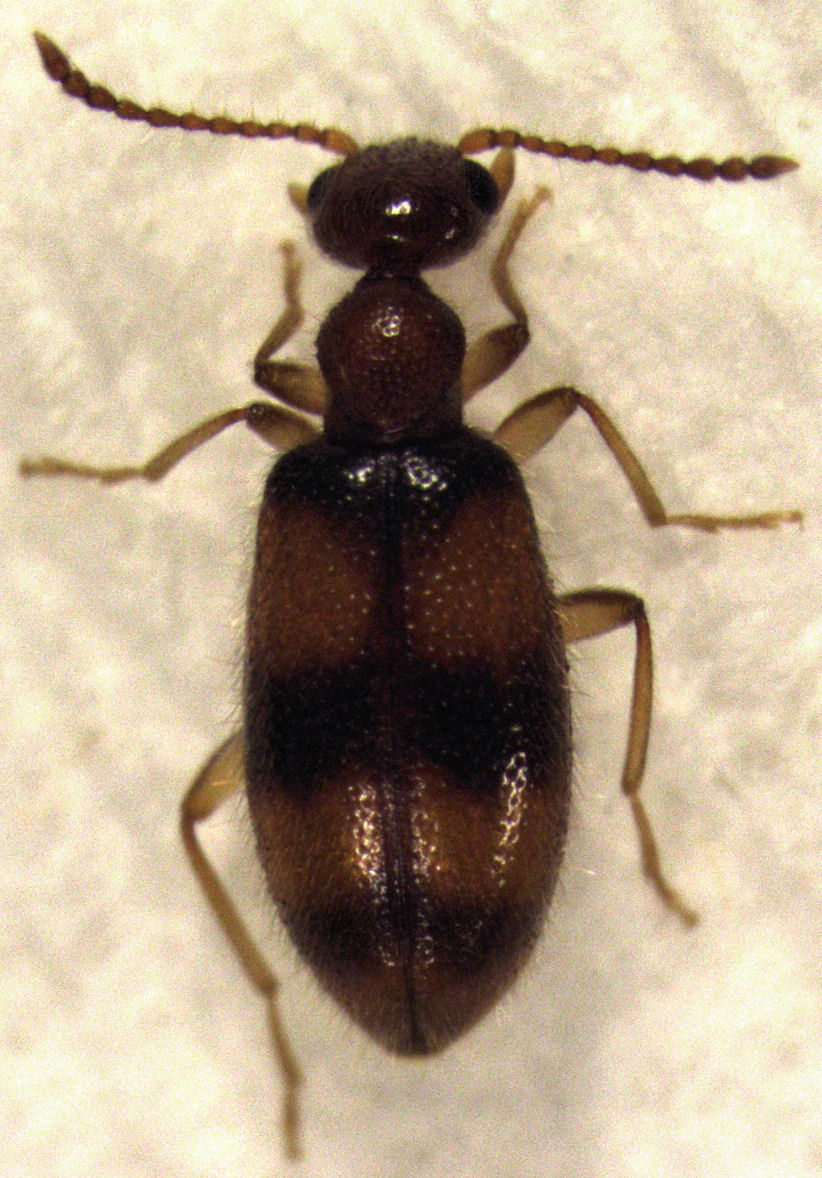
- adult female Sapintus deitzi, length about 3 mm

Scientific classification
- Kingdom: Animalia
- Phylum: Arthropoda
- Clade: Pancrustacea
- Class: Insecta
- Order: Coleoptera
- Suborder: Polyphaga
- Infraorder: Cucujiformia
- Family: Anthicidae
- Subfamily: Anthicinae
- Tribe: Anthicini
- Genus: Sapintus; Casey, 1895

= Sapintus =

Genus of beetles

Sapintus is a genus of antlike flower beetles in the family Anthicidae. There are at least 13 described species in Sapintus.

== Species ==
- Sapintus arizonicus Werner, 1962
- Sapintus caudatus Werner, 1962
- Sapintus corticalis (LeConte, 1851)
- Sapintus fulvipes (LaFerté-Sénectère, 1849)
- Sapintus hispidulus Casey, 1895
- Sapintus lemniscatus Werner, 1962
- Sapintus lutescens (Champion, 1890)
- Sapintus pallidus (Say, 1826)
- Sapintus pubescens (LaFerté-Sénectère, 1849)
- Sapintus pusillus (LaFerté-Sénectère, 1849)
- Sapintus similis Werner, 1983
- Sapintus teapensis (Champion, 1890)
- Sapintus timidus Casey, 1895
