= Anthicus nanus =

Scientific classification
- Domain: Eukaryota
- Kingdom: Animalia
- Phylum: Arthropoda
- Class: Insecta
- Order: Coleoptera
- Suborder: Polyphaga
- Infraorder: Cucujiformia
- Family: Anthicidae
- Genus: Anthicus
- Species: A. nanus

Binomial name
- Anthicus nanus LeConte, 1851

Synonyms
- Anthicus amoenus Casey, 1895; Anthicus innocens Casey, 1895; Anthicus inscitus Casey, 1895; Anthicus nympha Casey, 1895; Anthicus obliquus Casey, 1895; Anthicus peninsularis Casey, 1895; Anthicus vagans Casey, 1895

Species of beetle

Anthicus nanus is a species of antlike flower beetle in the family Anthicidae. It is found in Central America and North America.
