= Acanthinus clavicornis =

Scientific classification
- Domain: Eukaryota
- Kingdom: Animalia
- Phylum: Arthropoda
- Class: Insecta
- Order: Coleoptera
- Suborder: Polyphaga
- Infraorder: Cucujiformia
- Family: Anthicidae
- Genus: Acanthinus
- Species: A. clavicornis

Binomial name
- Acanthinus clavicornis (Champion, 1890)

Synonyms
- Acanthinus spectans Casey, 1904

Species of beetle

Acanthinus clavicornis is a species of antlike flower beetle in the family Anthicidae. It is found in Central America and North America.
