= Acanthinus myrmecops =

Scientific classification
- Kingdom: Animalia
- Phylum: Arthropoda
- Class: Insecta
- Order: Coleoptera
- Suborder: Polyphaga
- Infraorder: Cucujiformia
- Family: Anthicidae
- Genus: Acanthinus
- Species: A. myrmecops

Binomial name
- Acanthinus myrmecops (Casey, 1895)

Synonyms
- Acanthinus aureopilosus Pic, 1913; Acanthinus unicus Casey, 1895

Species of beetle

Acanthinus myrmecops is a species of antlike flower beetle in the family Anthicidae. It is found in North America.
