= Ischyropalpus sturmi =

Scientific classification
- Kingdom: Animalia
- Phylum: Arthropoda
- Class: Insecta
- Order: Coleoptera
- Suborder: Polyphaga
- Infraorder: Cucujiformia
- Family: Anthicidae
- Genus: Ischyropalpus
- Species: I. sturmi

Binomial name
- Ischyropalpus sturmi (LaFerté-Sénectère, 1849)

Synonyms
- Anthicus elegans LaFerté-Sénectère, 1849; Anthicus Sturmi LaFerté-Sénectère, 1849 (replacement name); Ischyropalpus elegans (LaFerté-Sénectère, 1849)

Species of beetle

Ischyropalpus sturmi is a species of antlike flower beetle, family Anthicidae. It is found in the eastern North America west to Texas and South Dakota. It is named after Jacob Sturm.

Ischyropalpus sturmi measure 2.9–3.0 mm (0.11–0.12 in).
