= Sapintus lemniscatus =

Scientific classification
- Domain: Eukaryota
- Kingdom: Animalia
- Phylum: Arthropoda
- Class: Insecta
- Order: Coleoptera
- Suborder: Polyphaga
- Infraorder: Cucujiformia
- Family: Anthicidae
- Genus: Sapintus
- Species: S. lemniscatus

Binomial name
- Sapintus lemniscatus Werner, 1962

Synonyms
- Sapintus donedai Bonadona, 1978

Species of beetle

Sapintus lemniscatus is a species of antlike flower beetle in the family Anthicidae. It is found in North America.
