= Notoxus nevadensis =

Scientific classification
- Kingdom: Animalia
- Phylum: Arthropoda
- Class: Insecta
- Order: Coleoptera
- Suborder: Polyphaga
- Infraorder: Cucujiformia
- Family: Anthicidae
- Genus: Notoxus
- Species: N. nevadensis

Binomial name
- Notoxus nevadensis Casey, 1895

Species of beetle

Notoxus nevadensis is a species of monoceros beetle in the family Anthicidae. It is found in North America.
