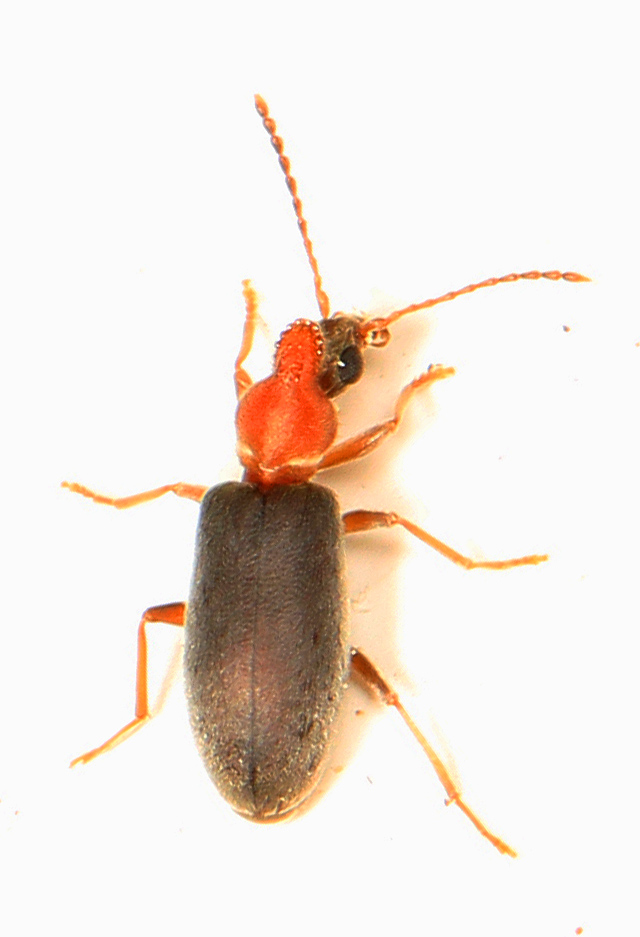

Scientific classification
- Kingdom: Animalia
- Phylum: Arthropoda
- Clade: Pancrustacea
- Class: Insecta
- Order: Coleoptera
- Suborder: Polyphaga
- Infraorder: Cucujiformia
- Family: Anthicidae
- Genus: Notoxus
- Species: N. murinipennis

Binomial name
- Notoxus murinipennis (J. E. LeConte, 1824)

= Notoxus murinipennis =

Species of beetle

Notoxus murinipennis is a species of monoceros beetle in the family Anthicidae. It is found in Central America and North America.
