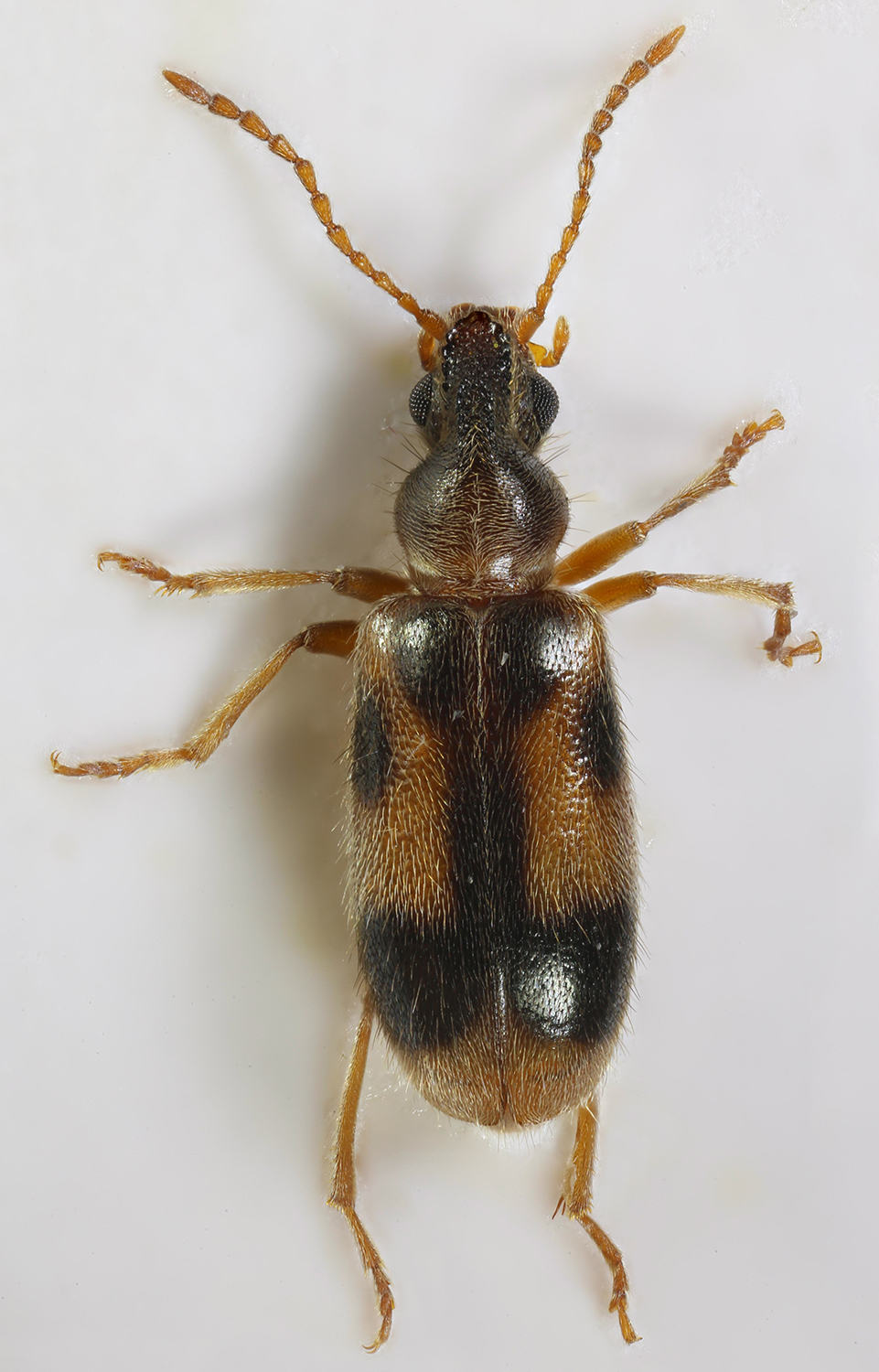
- Notoxus monoceros, Newborough Warren, North Wales

Scientific classification
- Domain: Eukaryota
- Kingdom: Animalia
- Phylum: Arthropoda
- Class: Insecta
- Order: Coleoptera
- Suborder: Polyphaga
- Infraorder: Cucujiformia
- Family: Anthicidae
- Genus: Notoxus
- Species: N. monoceros

Binomial name
- Notoxus monoceros (Linnaeus, 1761)

= Notoxus monoceros =

Species of beetle

Notoxus monoceros is a black and brown species of beetle that is about 4 millimeters long and resembles ants. The species markings are variable, it is usually found in sandy places, and it has a forward projection ("horn") on the pronotum.

Notoxus monoceros on Rubus idaeus
