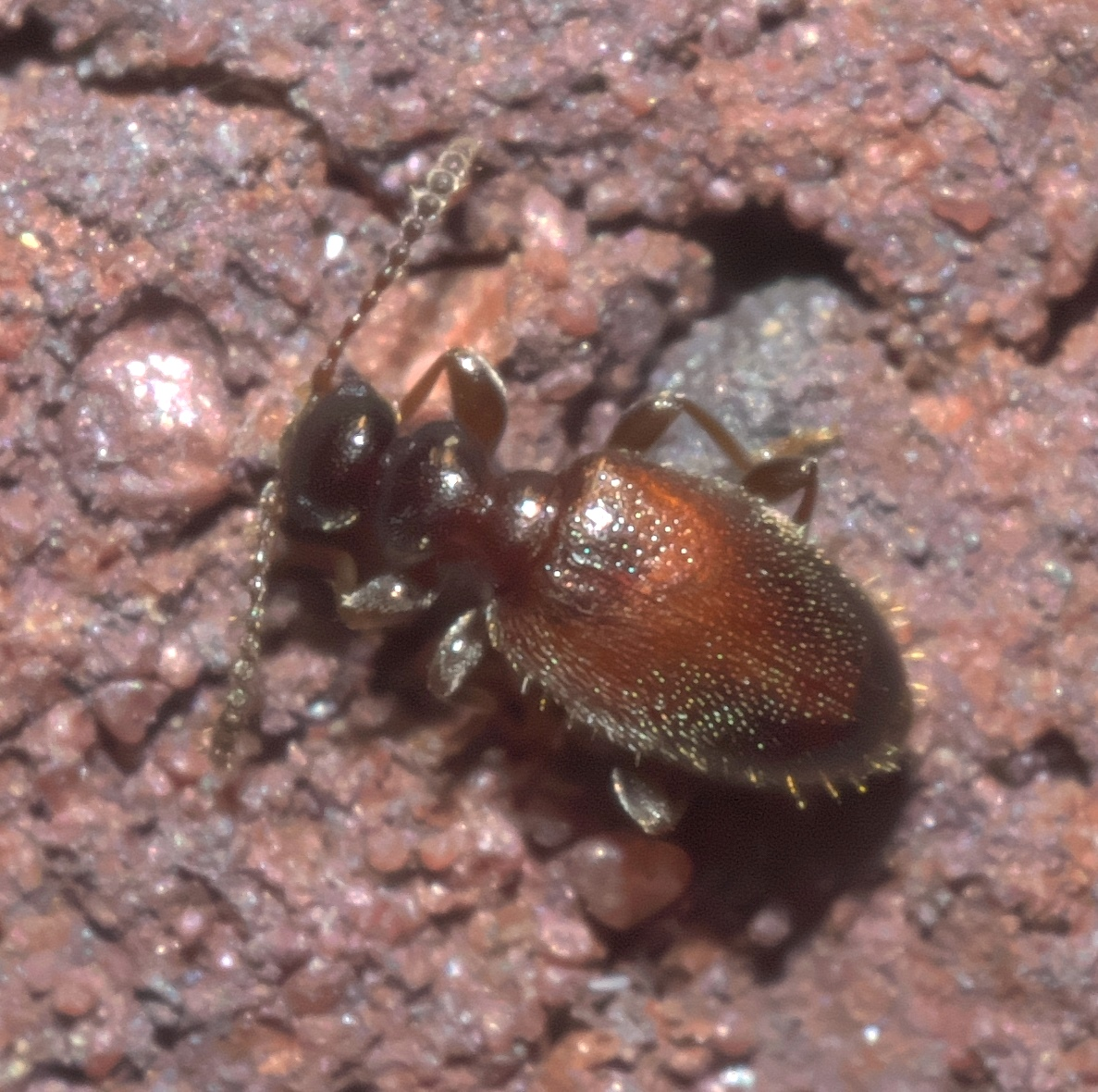

Scientific classification
- Kingdom: Animalia
- Phylum: Arthropoda
- Clade: Pancrustacea
- Class: Insecta
- Order: Coleoptera
- Suborder: Polyphaga
- Infraorder: Cucujiformia
- Family: Anthicidae
- Subfamily: Tomoderinae
- Genus: Tomoderus; LaFerté-Sénectère, 1849

= Tomoderus =

Genus of beetles

Tomoderus is a genus of antlike flower beetles in the family Anthicidae. There are about 200 described species in Tomoderus.

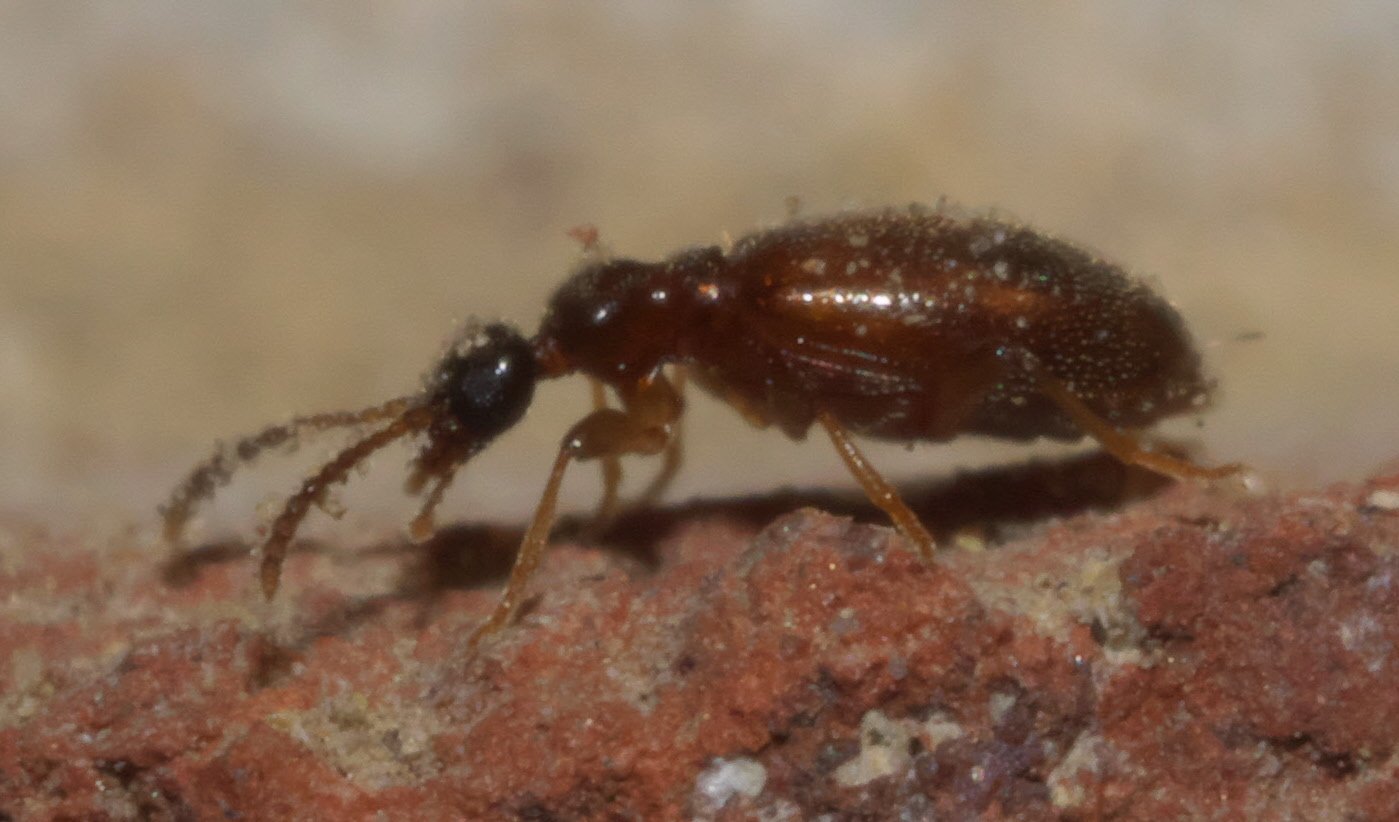

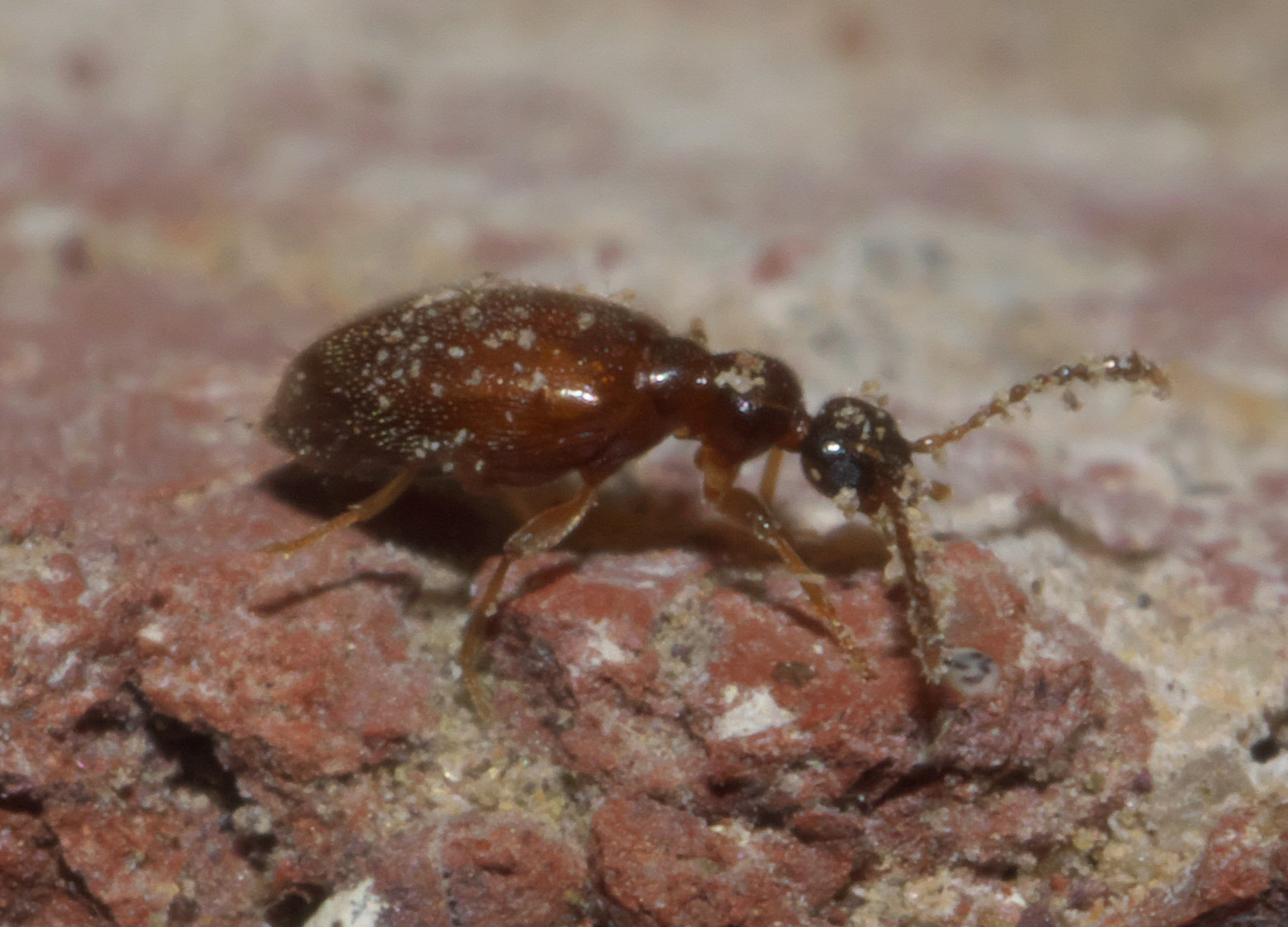

== Species ==
These 12 species belong to the genus Tomoderus:

- Tomoderus abditus^{g}
- Tomoderus bimaculatus Uhmann, 1988^{g}
- Tomoderus bosnicus Pic, 1892^{g}
- Tomoderus constrictus (Say, 1826)^{i c g b}
- Tomoderus dalmatinus Reitter, 1881^{g}
- Tomoderus ehlersi von Heyden, 1882^{g}
- Tomoderus impressulus Casey, 1895^{i c g}
- Tomoderus inhabilis Werner, 1958^{i c g}
- Tomoderus interruptus LaFerté-Sénectère, 1849^{i c g}
- Tomoderus italicus De Marseul, 1879^{g}
- Tomoderus lineatopunctatus Uhmann, 1994^{g}
- Tomoderus piochardi von Heyden, 1871^{g}

Data sources: i = ITIS, c = Catalogue of Life, g = GBIF, b = Bugguide.net
