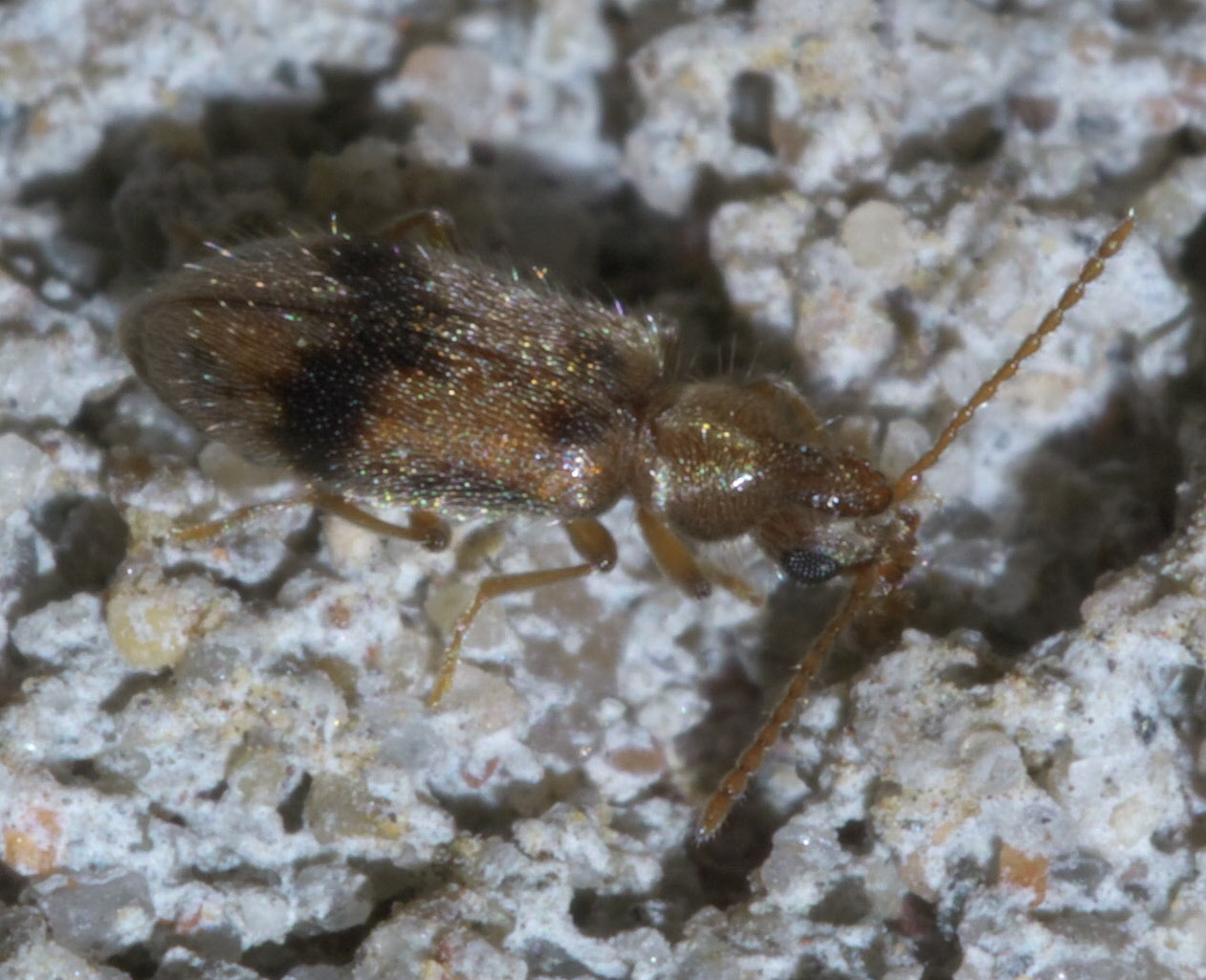

Scientific classification
- Kingdom: Animalia
- Phylum: Arthropoda
- Class: Insecta
- Order: Coleoptera
- Suborder: Polyphaga
- Infraorder: Cucujiformia
- Family: Anthicidae
- Genus: Notoxus
- Species: N. desertus

Binomial name
- Notoxus desertus Casey, 1895

Synonyms
- Notoxus constrictus Casey, 1895; Notoxus dinocerus Casey, 1895

= Notoxus desertus =

Species of beetle

Notoxus desertus is a species of monoceros beetle in the family Anthicidae. It is found in Central America and North America.
