= Notoxus planicornis =

Scientific classification
- Kingdom: Animalia
- Phylum: Arthropoda
- Class: Insecta
- Order: Coleoptera
- Suborder: Polyphaga
- Infraorder: Cucujiformia
- Family: Anthicidae
- Genus: Notoxus
- Species: N. planicornis

Binomial name
- Notoxus planicornis LaFerté-Sénectère, 1849

Synonyms
- Notoxus delicatus Casey, 1885

Species of beetle

Notoxus planicornis is a species of monoceros beetle in the family Anthicidae. It is found in the Caribbean Sea and North America.
