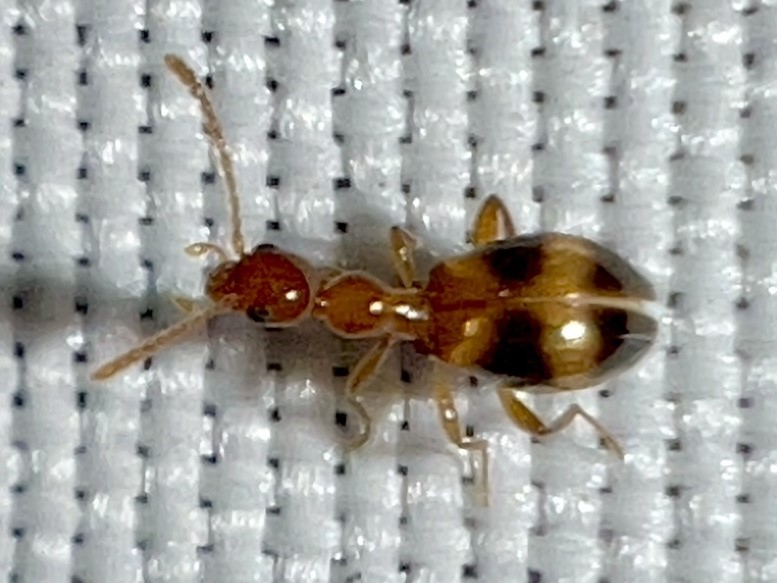

Scientific classification
- Kingdom: Animalia
- Phylum: Arthropoda
- Class: Insecta
- Order: Coleoptera
- Suborder: Polyphaga
- Infraorder: Cucujiformia
- Family: Anthicidae
- Genus: Acanthinus
- Species: A. scitulus

Binomial name
- Acanthinus scitulus (LeConte, 1852)

Synonyms
- Acanthinus cubana Pic, 1944; Acanthinus gracilipes Champion, 1890

= Acanthinus scitulus =

Species of beetle

Acanthinus scitulus is a species of antlike flower beetle in the family Anthicidae. It is found in the Caribbean, Central America, North America, and South America.
