= Anthicus punctulatus =

Scientific classification
- Domain: Eukaryota
- Kingdom: Animalia
- Phylum: Arthropoda
- Class: Insecta
- Order: Coleoptera
- Suborder: Polyphaga
- Infraorder: Cucujiformia
- Family: Anthicidae
- Genus: Anthicus
- Species: A. punctulatus

Binomial name
- Anthicus punctulatus LeConte, 1851

Synonyms
- Anthicus cephalotes Casey, 1895; Anthicus decrepitus Casey, 1895; Anthicus mercurialis Casey, 1895; Anthicus monticola Casey, 1895

Species of beetle

Anthicus punctulatus is a species of antlike flower beetle in the family Anthicidae. It is found in Central America and North America.
