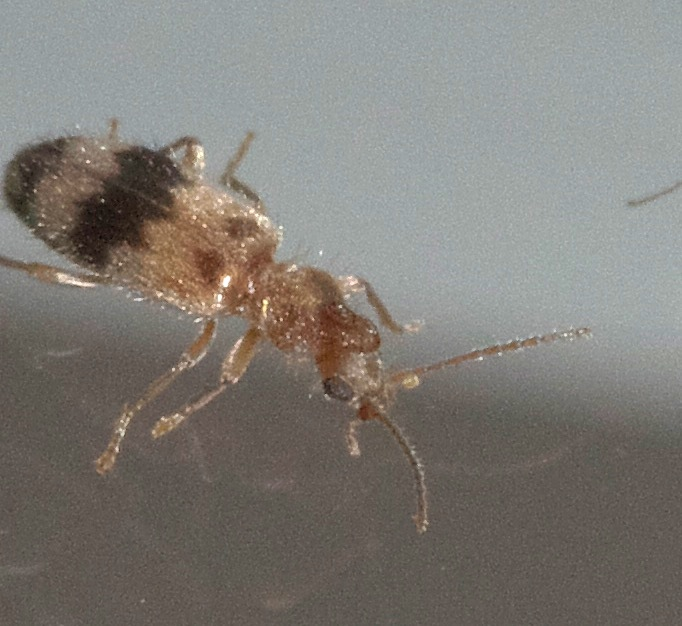

Scientific classification
- Domain: Eukaryota
- Kingdom: Animalia
- Phylum: Arthropoda
- Class: Insecta
- Order: Coleoptera
- Suborder: Polyphaga
- Infraorder: Cucujiformia
- Family: Anthicidae
- Genus: Notoxus
- Species: N. calcaratus

Binomial name
- Notoxus calcaratus Horn, 1884

= Notoxus calcaratus =

Species of beetle

Notoxus calcaratus is a species of monoceros beetle in the family Anthicidae. It is found in Central America and North America.
