= Stricticomus =

Scientific classification
- Kingdom: Animalia
- Phylum: Arthropoda
- Clade: Pancrustacea
- Class: Insecta
- Order: Coleoptera
- Suborder: Polyphaga
- Infraorder: Cucujiformia
- Family: Anthicidae
- Genus: Stricticomus; Pic, 1894

Genus of beetles

Stricticomus is a genus of beetles in the family Anthicidae, found in Eurasia, Madagascar and North America.

== Species ==
The following species are recognised in the genus Stricticomus:

- Stricticomus araxicola (Reitter, 1889)
- Stricticomus arcuaticeps (Pic, 1900)
- Stricticomus argenteofasciatus (Pic, 1894)
- Stricticomus bodemeyeri (Pic, 1913)
- Stricticomus goebelii (La Ferte-Senectere, 1849)
- Stricticomus herzi (Pic, 1905)
- Stricticomus modestus (LaFerte-Senectere, 1849)
- Stricticomus ornatus (Truqui, 1855)
- Stricticomus peplifer (Marseul, 1879)
- Stricticomus peyerimhoffi (Pic, 1902)
- Stricticomus rufithorax (La Ferte-Senectere, 1849)
- Stricticomus transcaspicus (Pic, 1898)
- Stricticomus truncatus (Pic, 1894)
- Stricticomus valgipes (Marseul, 1875)
- Stricticomus zagrosanus Telnov, 2010
- Stricticomus zeravshanus Telnov, 2010
