= Notoxus lustrellus =

Scientific classification
- Kingdom: Animalia
- Phylum: Arthropoda
- Class: Insecta
- Order: Coleoptera
- Suborder: Polyphaga
- Infraorder: Cucujiformia
- Family: Anthicidae
- Genus: Notoxus
- Species: N. lustrellus

Binomial name
- Notoxus lustrellus Casey, 1895

Synonyms
- Notoxus alamedae Casey, 1895

Species of beetle

Notoxus lustrellus is a species of monoceros beetle in the family Anthicidae. It is found in North America.
