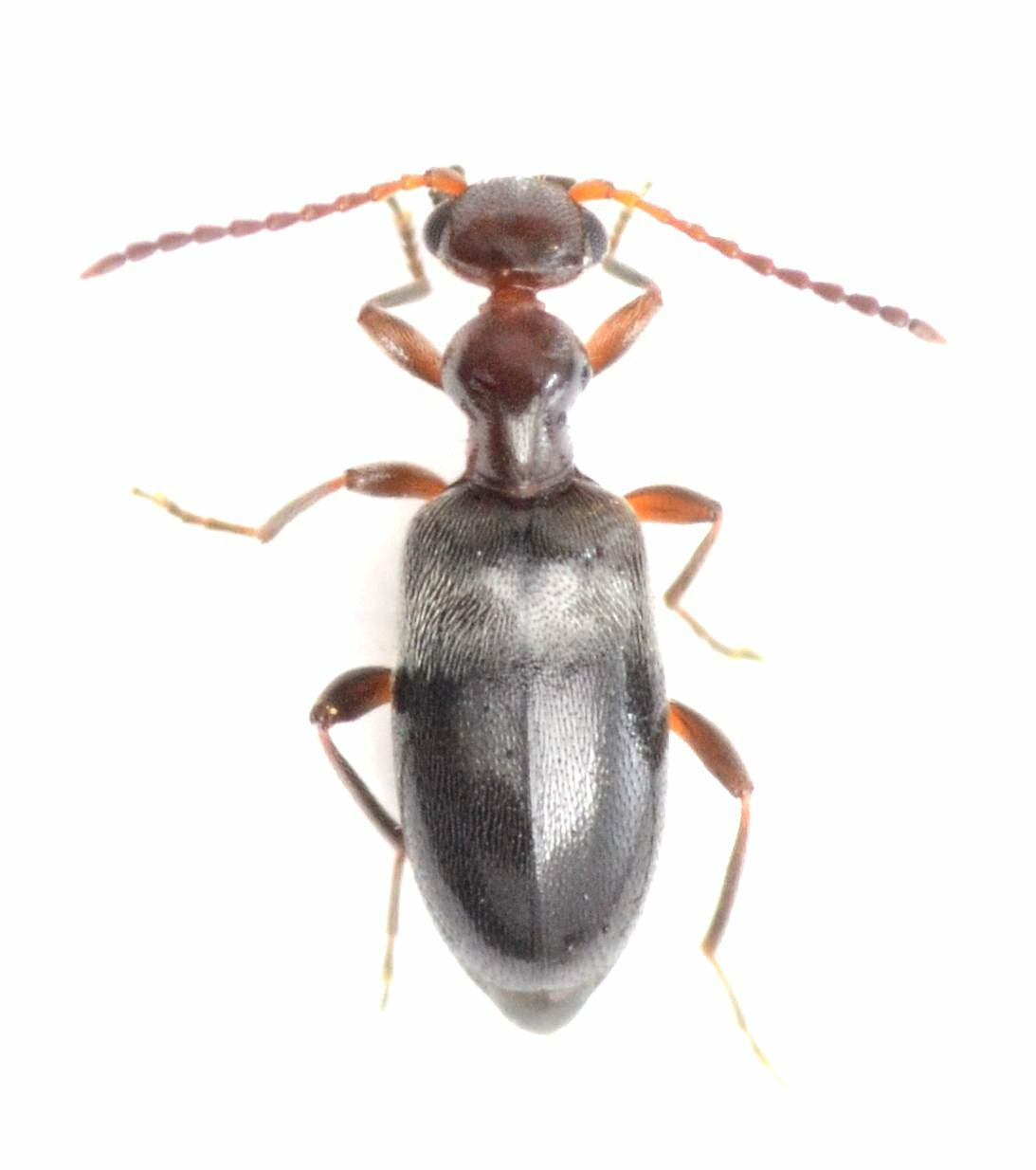

Scientific classification
- Kingdom: Animalia
- Phylum: Arthropoda
- Class: Insecta
- Order: Coleoptera
- Suborder: Polyphaga
- Infraorder: Cucujiformia
- Family: Anthicidae
- Genus: Ischyropalpus
- Species: I. nitidulus

Binomial name
- Ischyropalpus nitidulus (LeConte, 1852)

Synonyms
- Anthicus nitidulus LeConte, 1851; Lappus nitidulus (LeConte, 1851); Lappus alacer Casey, 1895; Lappus asperulus Casey, 1895; Lappus cursor Casey, 1895; Lappus nubilatus Casey, 1895; Lappus solivagans Casey, 1895; Lappus vigilans Casey, 1895; Ischyropalpus canonicus Casey, 1895

= Ischyropalpus nitidulus =

Species of beetle

Ischyropalpus nitidulus is a species of antlike flower beetle, family Anthicidae. It is widespread in North America from northern Mexico to southern Canada; it is absent from southeastern United States.

Ischyropalpus nitidulus measure 2.6–3.3 mm (0.10–0.13 in).
