= Cyclodinus annectens =

Scientific classification
- Domain: Eukaryota
- Kingdom: Animalia
- Phylum: Arthropoda
- Class: Insecta
- Order: Coleoptera
- Suborder: Polyphaga
- Infraorder: Cucujiformia
- Family: Anthicidae
- Genus: Cyclodinus
- Species: C. annectens

Binomial name
- Cyclodinus annectens (LeConte, 1851)

Species of beetle

Cyclodinus annectens is a species of antlike flower beetle in the family Anthicidae. It is found in Central America and North America.
