= Anthicus ephippium =

Scientific classification
- Kingdom: Animalia
- Phylum: Arthropoda
- Class: Insecta
- Order: Coleoptera
- Suborder: Polyphaga
- Infraorder: Cucujiformia
- Family: Anthicidae
- Genus: Anthicus
- Species: A. ephippium

Binomial name
- Anthicus ephippium LaFerté-Sénectère, 1849

Synonyms
- Anthicus confusus LeConte, 1852; Anthicus difficilis LeConte, 1850; Anthicus luteolus LeConte, 1851; Anthicus pinguescens Casey, 1895; Anthicus simiolus Casey, 1895

Species of beetle

Anthicus ephippium is a species of antlike flower beetle in the family Anthicidae. It is found in Central America, North America, and Oceania.
