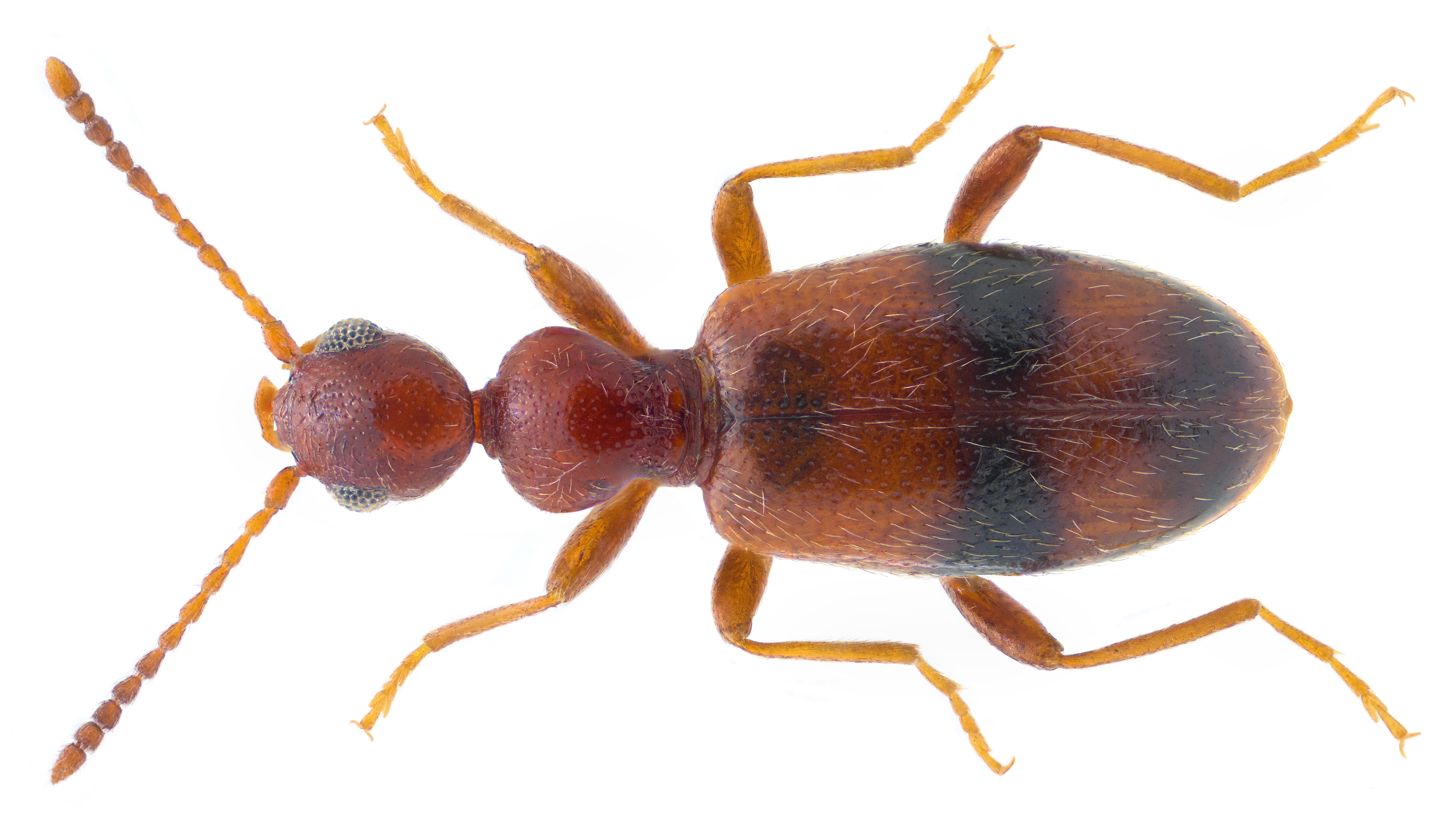
- Size: 2.6 mm (2.5 to 3,0 mm)

Scientific classification
- Kingdom: Animalia
- Phylum: Arthropoda
- Clade: Pancrustacea
- Class: Insecta
- Order: Coleoptera
- Suborder: Polyphaga
- Infraorder: Cucujiformia
- Family: Anthicidae
- Subfamily: Anthicinae
- Genus: Cyclodinus; Mulsant & Rey, 1866

Synonyms
- Thicanus Casey, 1895

= Cyclodinus =

Genus of beetles

Cyclodinus is a genus of antlike flower beetles in the family Anthicidae. There are more than 40 described species in Cyclodinus.

== Species ==
These 48 species belong to the genus Cyclodinus:

- Cyclodinus angustulus (Pic, 1892)
- Cyclodinus annectens (LeConte, 1851)
- Cyclodinus ataensis (Pic, 1901)
- Cyclodinus basanicus (Sahlberg, 1913)
- Cyclodinus bicarinula (De Marseul, 1879)
- Cyclodinus blandulus (Baudi, 1877)
- Cyclodinus bremei (La Ferté-Sénectère, 1842)
- Cyclodinus brivioi Bucciarelli, 1962
- Cyclodinus californicus (LaFerté-Sénectère, 1849)
- Cyclodinus cerastes (Truqui, 1855)
- Cyclodinus coniceps (Marseul, 1879)
- Cyclodinus croissandeaui (Pic, 1893)
- Cyclodinus debilis (La Ferte-Senectere, 1849)
- Cyclodinus dentatus (Pic, 1895)
- Cyclodinus desbrochersi (Pic, 1893)
- Cyclodinus dimidiatus (Wollaston, 1864)
- Cyclodinus erro (Truqui, 1855)
- Cyclodinus fancelloi Degiovanni, 2015
- Cyclodinus fatuus (Truqui, 1855)
- Cyclodinus forticornis (Pic, 1893)
- Cyclodinus franciscanus (Casey, 1895)
- Cyclodinus humilis (Germar, 1824)
- Cyclodinus incomptus (Truqui, 1855)
- Cyclodinus italicus (Pic, 1901)
- Cyclodinus kryzhanovskii Blinstein, 1988
- Cyclodinus larvipennis (Marseul, 1879)
- Cyclodinus longipilis (C.Brisout de Barneville, 1863)
- Cyclodinus lotus (De Marseul, 1879)
- Cyclodinus lucidicollis (De Marseul, 1879)
- Cyclodinus maltzevi Blinstein, 1988
- Cyclodinus mediobrunneus (Pic, 1893)
- Cyclodinus mimus (Casey, 1895)
- Cyclodinus minutus (La Ferté-Sénectère, 1842)
- Cyclodinus misoloughii (Pic, 1893)
- Cyclodinus moltonii Bucciarelli, 1961
- Cyclodinus mono Chandler, 2005
- Cyclodinus montandoni (Pic, 1909)
- Cyclodinus mundulus (Sharp, 1885)
- Cyclodinus paiute Chandler, 2005
- Cyclodinus reitteri (Pic, 1892)
- Cyclodinus roberti (Pic, 1892)
- Cyclodinus salinus (Crotch, 1867)
- Cyclodinus sareptanus (Pic, 1893)
- Cyclodinus sauteri (Pic, 1913)
- Cyclodinus semiopacus (Reitter, 1887)
- Cyclodinus sibiricus Pic, 1893
- Cyclodinus thessalius (De Marseul, 1879)
- Cyclodinus ustulatus (La Ferte-Senectere, 1849)
