= Anthicus melancholicus =

Scientific classification
- Kingdom: Animalia
- Phylum: Arthropoda
- Class: Insecta
- Order: Coleoptera
- Suborder: Polyphaga
- Infraorder: Cucujiformia
- Family: Anthicidae
- Genus: Anthicus
- Species: A. melancholicus

Binomial name
- Anthicus melancholicus LaFerté-Sénectère, 1849

Synonyms
- Anthicus facilis Casey, 1885; Anthicus latebrans LeConte, 1852; Anthicus spretus LeConte, 1852

Species of beetle

Anthicus melancholicus is a species of antlike flower beetle in the family Anthicidae. It is found in North America.
