= Anthicus dilaticollis =

Scientific classification
- Domain: Eukaryota
- Kingdom: Animalia
- Phylum: Arthropoda
- Class: Insecta
- Order: Coleoptera
- Suborder: Polyphaga
- Infraorder: Cucujiformia
- Family: Anthicidae
- Genus: Anthicus
- Species: A. dilaticollis

Binomial name
- Anthicus dilaticollis Champion, 1890

Species of beetle

Anthicus dilaticollis is a species of antlike flower beetle in the family Anthicidae. It is found in Central America and North America.
