= Anthicus sacramento =

Conservation status
- Endangered (IUCN 3.1)

Scientific classification
- Kingdom: Animalia
- Phylum: Arthropoda
- Class: Insecta
- Order: Coleoptera
- Suborder: Polyphaga
- Infraorder: Cucujiformia
- Family: Anthicidae
- Genus: Anthicus
- Species: A. sacramento

Binomial name
- Anthicus sacramento Chandler, 1978

Species of beetle

Anthicus sacramento, the Sacramento anthicid beetle or Sacramento beetle, is a species of ant-like flower beetle that is endemic to California in the United States. It can be found in sand dune areas along the Sacramento and San Joaquin Rivers from Shasta to San Joaquin counties, and from the Feather River at Nicolaus. It is threatened by riverside development, canalization and river drainage.
