= Acanthinus exilis =

Scientific classification
- Kingdom: Animalia
- Phylum: Arthropoda
- Class: Insecta
- Order: Coleoptera
- Suborder: Polyphaga
- Infraorder: Cucujiformia
- Family: Anthicidae
- Genus: Acanthinus
- Species: A. exilis

Binomial name
- Acanthinus exilis (LaFerté-Sénectère, 1849)

Species of beetle

Acanthinus exilis is a species of antlike flower beetle in the family Anthicidae. It is found in North America.
