= Cyclodinus mimus =

Scientific classification
- Kingdom: Animalia
- Phylum: Arthropoda
- Class: Insecta
- Order: Coleoptera
- Suborder: Polyphaga
- Infraorder: Cucujiformia
- Family: Anthicidae
- Genus: Cyclodinus
- Species: C. mimus

Binomial name
- Cyclodinus mimus (Casey, 1895)

Species of beetle

Cyclodinus mimus is a species of antlike flower beetle in the family Anthicidae. It is found in Central America and North America.
