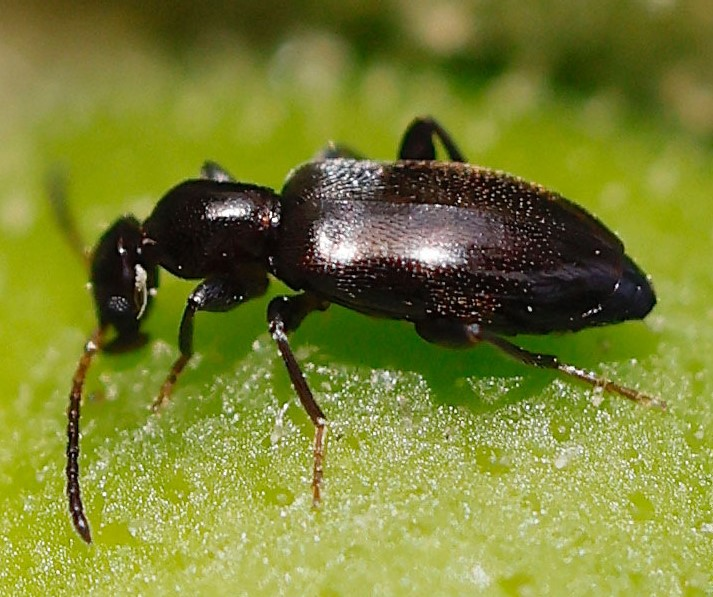

Scientific classification
- Kingdom: Animalia
- Phylum: Arthropoda
- Class: Insecta
- Order: Coleoptera
- Suborder: Polyphaga
- Infraorder: Cucujiformia
- Family: Anthicidae
- Genus: Ischyropalpus
- Species: I. occidentalis

Binomial name
- Ischyropalpus occidentalis (Champion, 1890)

Synonyms
- Anthicus occidentalis Champion, 1890

= Ischyropalpus occidentalis =

Species of beetle

Ischyropalpus occidentalis is a species of antlike flower beetle, family Anthicidae. It is found in Central and North America from Costa Rica or Honduras northward to Mexico and Southwestern United States.

Ischyropalpus occidentalis measure 2.4–2.8 mm (0.094–0.110 in).
