= Ischyropalpus turgidicollis =

Scientific classification
- Kingdom: Animalia
- Phylum: Arthropoda
- Class: Insecta
- Order: Coleoptera
- Suborder: Polyphaga
- Infraorder: Cucujiformia
- Family: Anthicidae
- Genus: Ischyropalpus
- Species: I. turgidicollis

Binomial name
- Ischyropalpus turgidicollis (Casey, 1895)

Synonyms
- Lappus turgidicollis Casey, 1895; Lappus animatus Casey, 1895; Ischyropalpus animatus (Casey, 1895)

Species of beetle

Ischyropalpus turgidicollis is a species of antlike flower beetle, family Anthicidae. It is found in the western North America from British Columbia (Canada) south to Baja California (Mexico) and Texas (United States).

Ischyropalpus turgidicollis measure 2.4–3.2 mm (0.094–0.126 in).
