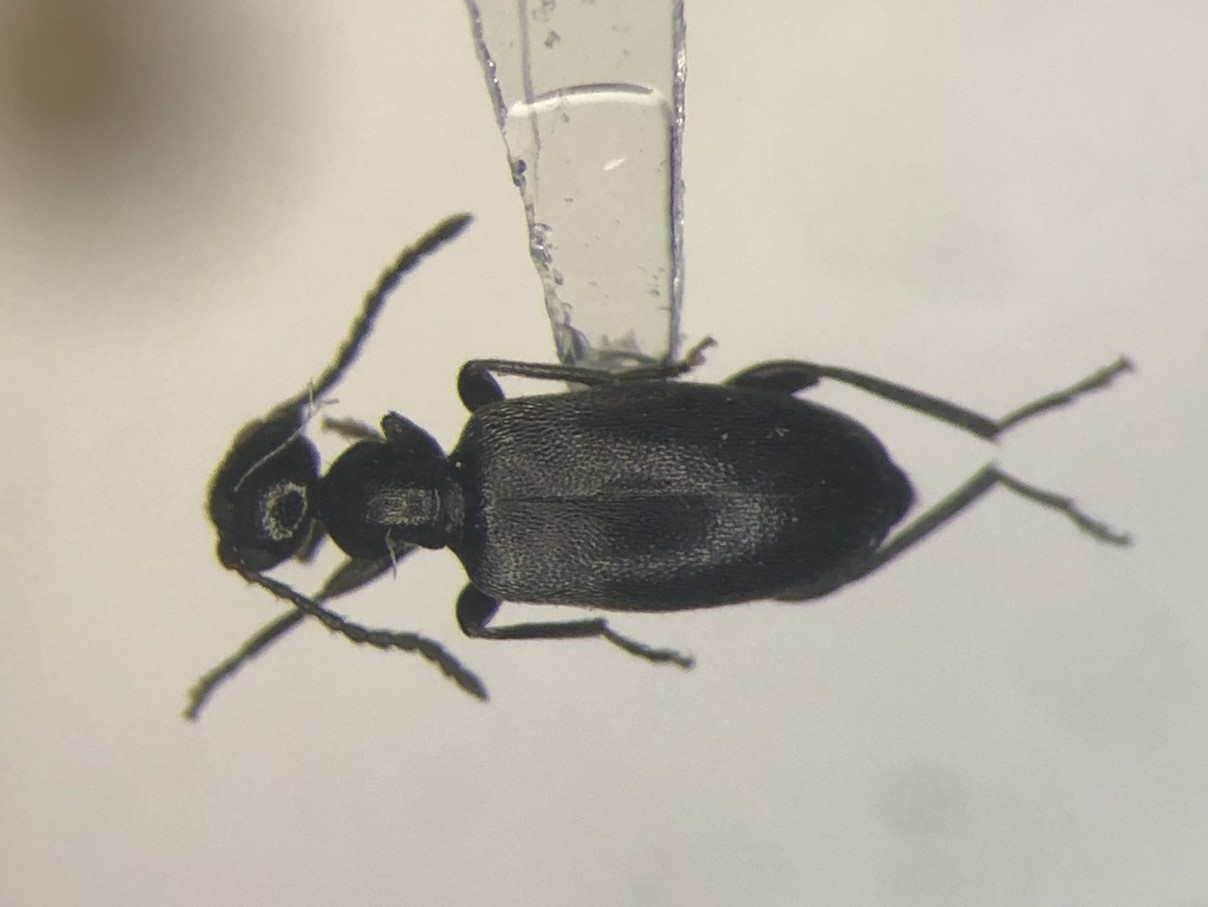
- Ischyropalpus obscurus

Scientific classification
- Kingdom: Animalia
- Phylum: Arthropoda
- Clade: Pancrustacea
- Class: Insecta
- Order: Coleoptera
- Suborder: Polyphaga
- Infraorder: Cucujiformia
- Family: Anthicidae
- Subfamily: Anthicinae
- Genus: Ischyropalpus; LaFerté-Sénectère, 1849

Synonyms
- Lappus Casey, 1895

= Ischyropalpus =

Genus of beetles

Ischyropalpus is a genus of antlike flower beetles in the family Anthicidae. There are about 15 described species in Ischyropalpus.

== Species ==
These 18 species belong to the genus Ischyropalpus:

- Ischyropalpus aberratus Telnov & Degiovanni, 2021
- Ischyropalpus bipartitus (Casey, 1895)
- Ischyropalpus cochisei Werner, 1973
- Ischyropalpus dispar Werner, 1973
- Ischyropalpus gemellus Werner, 1973
- Ischyropalpus lividus (Casey, 1895)
- Ischyropalpus nitidulus (LeConte, 1852)
- Ischyropalpus obscurus (LaFerté-Sénectère, 1849)
- Ischyropalpus occidentalis (Champion, 1890)
- Ischyropalpus ornatellus (Casey, 1895)
- Ischyropalpus pinalicus (Casey, 1895)
- Ischyropalpus placidus Werner, 1973
- Ischyropalpus quadrimaculatus Telnov & Degiovanni, 2021
- Ischyropalpus similis Telnov & Degiovanni, 2021
- Ischyropalpus sturmi (LaFerté-Sénectère, 1849)
- Ischyropalpus subtilissimus (Pic, 1896)
- Ischyropalpus turgidicollis (Casey, 1895)
- Ischyropalpus vividus (Casey, 1895)
