= Sapintus fulvipes =

Scientific classification
- Kingdom: Animalia
- Phylum: Arthropoda
- Class: Insecta
- Order: Coleoptera
- Suborder: Polyphaga
- Infraorder: Cucujiformia
- Family: Anthicidae
- Genus: Sapintus
- Species: S. fulvipes

Binomial name
- Sapintus fulvipes (LaFerté-Sénectère, 1849)

Synonyms
- Sapintus colonus Casey, 1895; Sapintus rusticus Casey, 1895

Species of beetle

Sapintus fulvipes is a species of antlike flower beetles in the family Anthicidae. It is found in the Caribbean and North America.

Taxonomic note:

- Chandler (1999) determined that the publication date of LaFerté's Monographie des Anthicus is probably May, 1849.
