= Notoxus subtilis =

Scientific classification
- Domain: Eukaryota
- Kingdom: Animalia
- Phylum: Arthropoda
- Class: Insecta
- Order: Coleoptera
- Suborder: Polyphaga
- Infraorder: Cucujiformia
- Family: Anthicidae
- Genus: Notoxus
- Species: N. subtilis

Binomial name
- Notoxus subtilis LeConte, 1852

Species of beetle

Notoxus subtilis is a species of monoceros beetle in the family Anthicidae. It is found in North America.
