= Anthicus lutulentus =

Scientific classification
- Kingdom: Animalia
- Phylum: Arthropoda
- Class: Insecta
- Order: Coleoptera
- Suborder: Polyphaga
- Infraorder: Cucujiformia
- Family: Anthicidae
- Genus: Anthicus
- Species: A. lutulentus

Binomial name
- Anthicus lutulentus Casey, 1895

Synonyms
- Anthicus agilis Casey, 1895; Anthicus herifuga Casey, 1895; Anthicus mundus Casey, 1895

Species of beetle

Anthicus lutulentus is a species of antlike flower beetle in the family Anthicidae. It is found in Central America and North America.
