= Anthicus haldemani =

Scientific classification
- Domain: Eukaryota
- Kingdom: Animalia
- Phylum: Arthropoda
- Class: Insecta
- Order: Coleoptera
- Suborder: Polyphaga
- Infraorder: Cucujiformia
- Family: Anthicidae
- Genus: Anthicus
- Species: A. haldemani

Binomial name
- Anthicus haldemani LeConte, 1852

Synonyms
- Anthicus decorellus Casey, 1895; Anthicus saucius Casey, 1895

Species of beetle

Anthicus haldemani is a species of antlike flower beetle in the family Anthicidae. It is found in North America.
