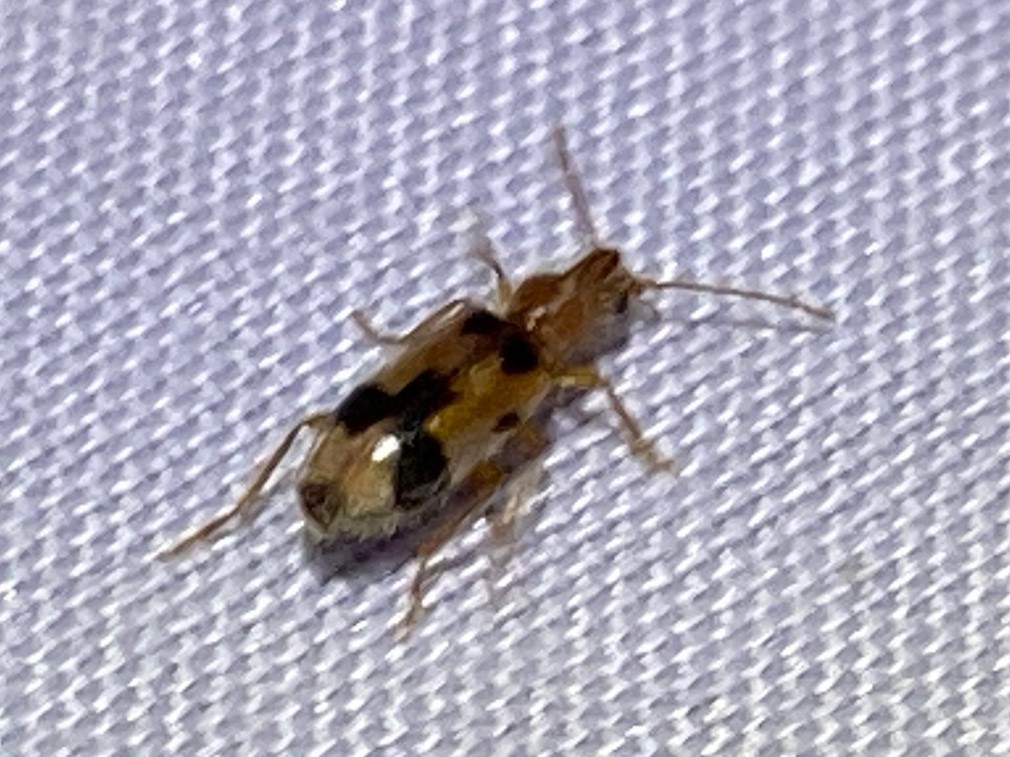

Scientific classification
- Kingdom: Animalia
- Phylum: Arthropoda
- Class: Insecta
- Order: Coleoptera
- Suborder: Polyphaga
- Infraorder: Cucujiformia
- Family: Anthicidae
- Genus: Notoxus
- Species: N. serratus

Binomial name
- Notoxus serratus (LeConte, 1847)

Synonyms
- Notoxus digitatus LeConte, 1876; Notoxus vandykei Blaisdell, 1929

= Notoxus serratus =

Species of beetle

Notoxus serratus is a species of monoceros beetle in the family Anthicidae. It is found in Central America and North America.
