= Ischyropalpus cochisei =

Scientific classification
- Kingdom: Animalia
- Phylum: Arthropoda
- Class: Insecta
- Order: Coleoptera
- Suborder: Polyphaga
- Infraorder: Cucujiformia
- Family: Anthicidae
- Genus: Ischyropalpus
- Species: I. cochisei

Binomial name
- Ischyropalpus cochisei Werner, 1973

Species of beetle

Ischyropalpus cochisei is a species of antlike flower beetle, family Anthicidae. It is found in North America (Mexico, western United States, southwestern Canada). Its specific name refers to its type locality, Cochise Stronghold in Arizona.

Ischyropalpus cochisei measure 2.5–3.2 mm (0.098–0.126 in).
