= Notoxus monodon =

Scientific classification
- Domain: Eukaryota
- Kingdom: Animalia
- Phylum: Arthropoda
- Class: Insecta
- Order: Coleoptera
- Suborder: Polyphaga
- Infraorder: Cucujiformia
- Family: Anthicidae
- Genus: Notoxus
- Species: N. monodon

Binomial name
- Notoxus monodon (Fabricius, 1801)

Synonyms
- Notoxus austinianus Casey, 1895

Species of beetle

Notoxus monodon, the antlike flower beetle, is a species of monoceros beetle in the family Anthicidae. It is found in North America.
