= Notoxus apicalis =

Scientific classification
- Domain: Eukaryota
- Kingdom: Animalia
- Phylum: Arthropoda
- Class: Insecta
- Order: Coleoptera
- Suborder: Polyphaga
- Infraorder: Cucujiformia
- Family: Anthicidae
- Genus: Notoxus
- Species: N. apicalis

Binomial name
- Notoxus apicalis LeConte, 1852

Synonyms
- Notoxus nuperoides Fall, 1916; Notoxus pallidus Fall, 1916

Species of beetle

Notoxus apicalis is a species of monoceros beetle in the family Anthicidae. It is found in Central America and North America.
