= Anthicus scabriceps =

Scientific classification
- Domain: Eukaryota
- Kingdom: Animalia
- Phylum: Arthropoda
- Class: Insecta
- Order: Coleoptera
- Suborder: Polyphaga
- Infraorder: Cucujiformia
- Family: Anthicidae
- Genus: Anthicus
- Species: A. scabriceps

Binomial name
- Anthicus scabriceps LeConte, 1850

Synonyms
- Anthicus compositus Casey, 1895

Species of beetle

Anthicus scabriceps is a species of antlike flower beetle in the family Anthicidae. It is found in North America.
