= Anthicus biguttulus =

Scientific classification
- Domain: Eukaryota
- Kingdom: Animalia
- Phylum: Arthropoda
- Class: Insecta
- Order: Coleoptera
- Suborder: Polyphaga
- Infraorder: Cucujiformia
- Family: Anthicidae
- Genus: Anthicus
- Species: A. biguttulus

Binomial name
- Anthicus biguttulus LeConte, 1851

Synonyms
- Anthicus ovicollis Casey, 1895; Anthicus protectus Casey, 1895

Species of beetle

Anthicus biguttulus is a species of antlike flower beetle in the family Anthicidae. It is found in North America.
