= Sapintus pubescens =

Scientific classification
- Kingdom: Animalia
- Phylum: Arthropoda
- Class: Insecta
- Order: Coleoptera
- Suborder: Polyphaga
- Infraorder: Cucujiformia
- Family: Anthicidae
- Genus: Sapintus
- Species: S. pubescens

Binomial name
- Sapintus pubescens (LaFerté-Sénectère, 1849)

Species of beetle

Sapintus pubescens is a species of antlike flower beetle in the family Anthicidae. It is found in North America.
