= Acanthinus dromedarius =

Scientific classification
- Kingdom: Animalia
- Phylum: Arthropoda
- Class: Insecta
- Order: Coleoptera
- Suborder: Polyphaga
- Infraorder: Cucujiformia
- Family: Anthicidae
- Genus: Acanthinus
- Species: A. dromedarius

Binomial name
- Acanthinus dromedarius (LaFerté-Sénectère, 1849)

Synonyms
- Acanthinus lulingensis Casey, 1904; Acanthinus subtropicus Casey, 1904

Species of beetle

Acanthinus dromedarius is a species of antlike flower beetle in the family Anthicidae. It is found in Central America, North America, and South America.
