= Sapintus lutescens =

Scientific classification
- Domain: Eukaryota
- Kingdom: Animalia
- Phylum: Arthropoda
- Class: Insecta
- Order: Coleoptera
- Suborder: Polyphaga
- Infraorder: Cucujiformia
- Family: Anthicidae
- Genus: Sapintus
- Species: S. lutescens

Binomial name
- Sapintus lutescens (Champion, 1890)

Species of beetle

Sapintus lutescens is a species of antlike flower beetle in the family Anthicidae. It is found in Central America and North America.
