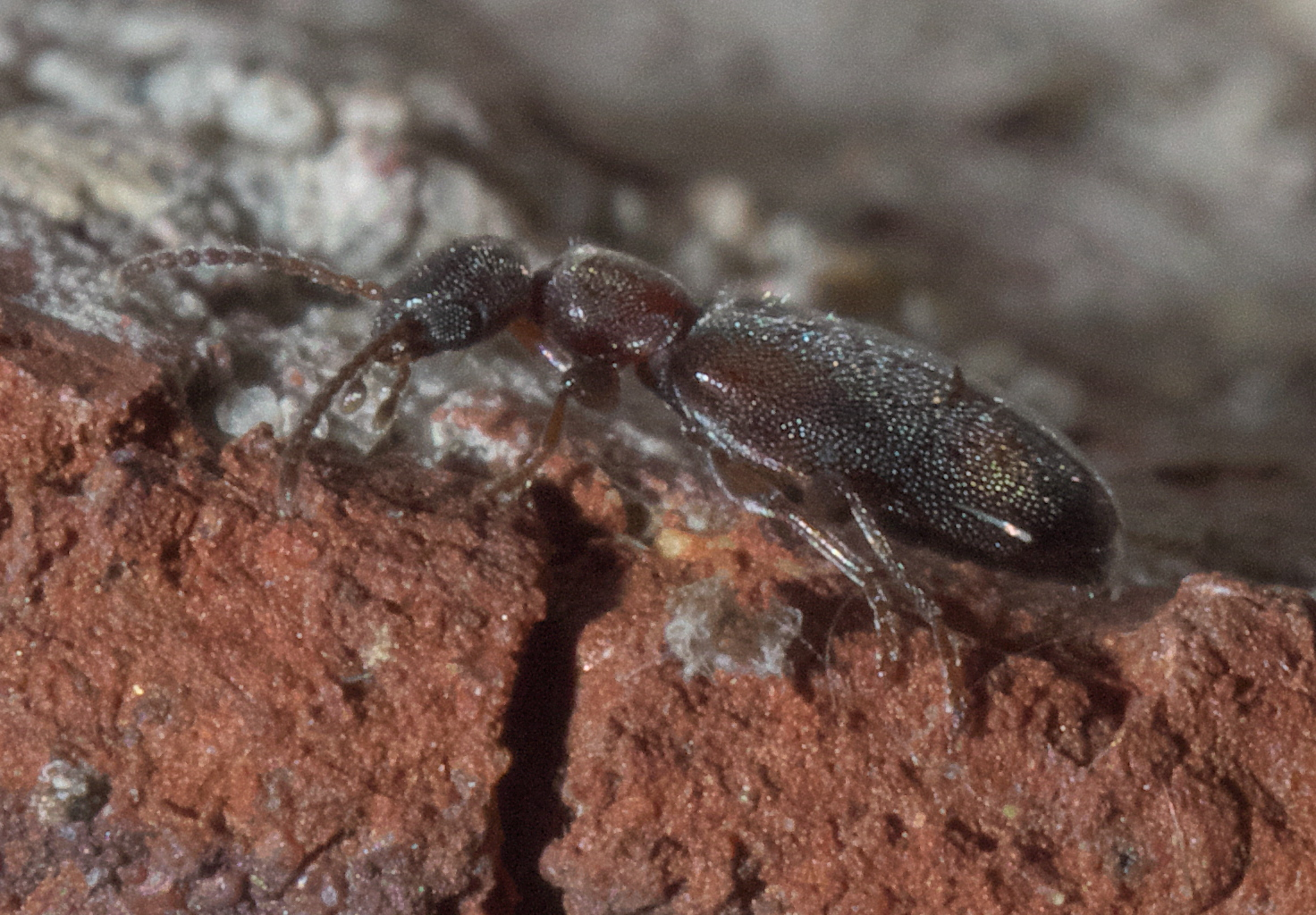

Scientific classification
- Kingdom: Animalia
- Phylum: Arthropoda
- Class: Insecta
- Order: Coleoptera
- Suborder: Polyphaga
- Infraorder: Cucujiformia
- Family: Anthicidae
- Genus: Anthicus
- Species: A. cervinus

Binomial name
- Anthicus cervinus LaFerté-Sénectère, 1849

Synonyms
- Anthicus bizonatus LaFerté-Sénectère, 1849; Anthicus gilensis Casey, 1895; Anthicus seminotatus Casey, 1895; Anthicus terminalis LeConte, 1850

= Anthicus cervinus =

Species of beetle

Anthicus cervinus, the cloudy flower beetle, is a species of antlike flower beetle in the family Anthicidae. It is found in Central America and North America.

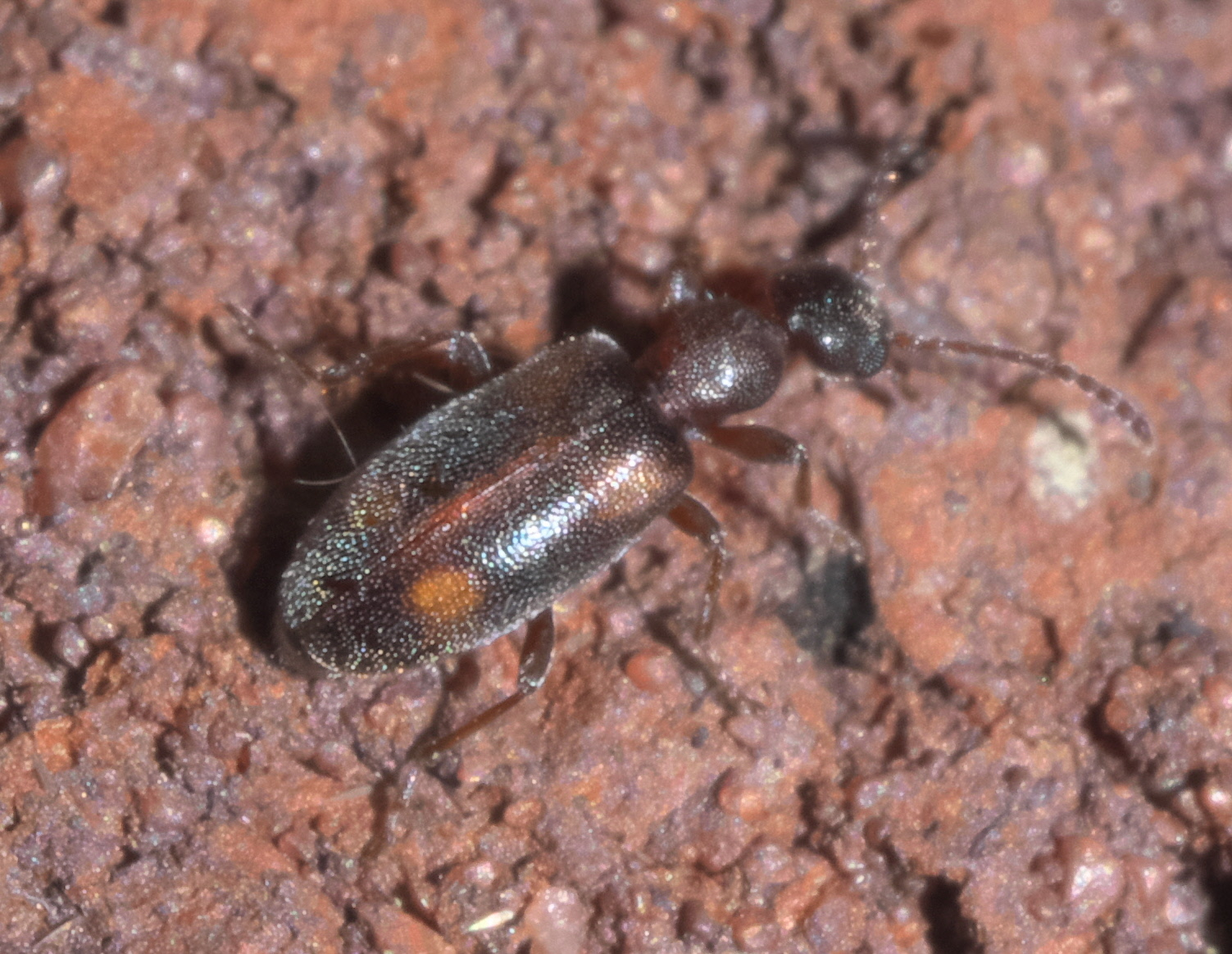
Cloudy flower beetle, Anthicus cervinus

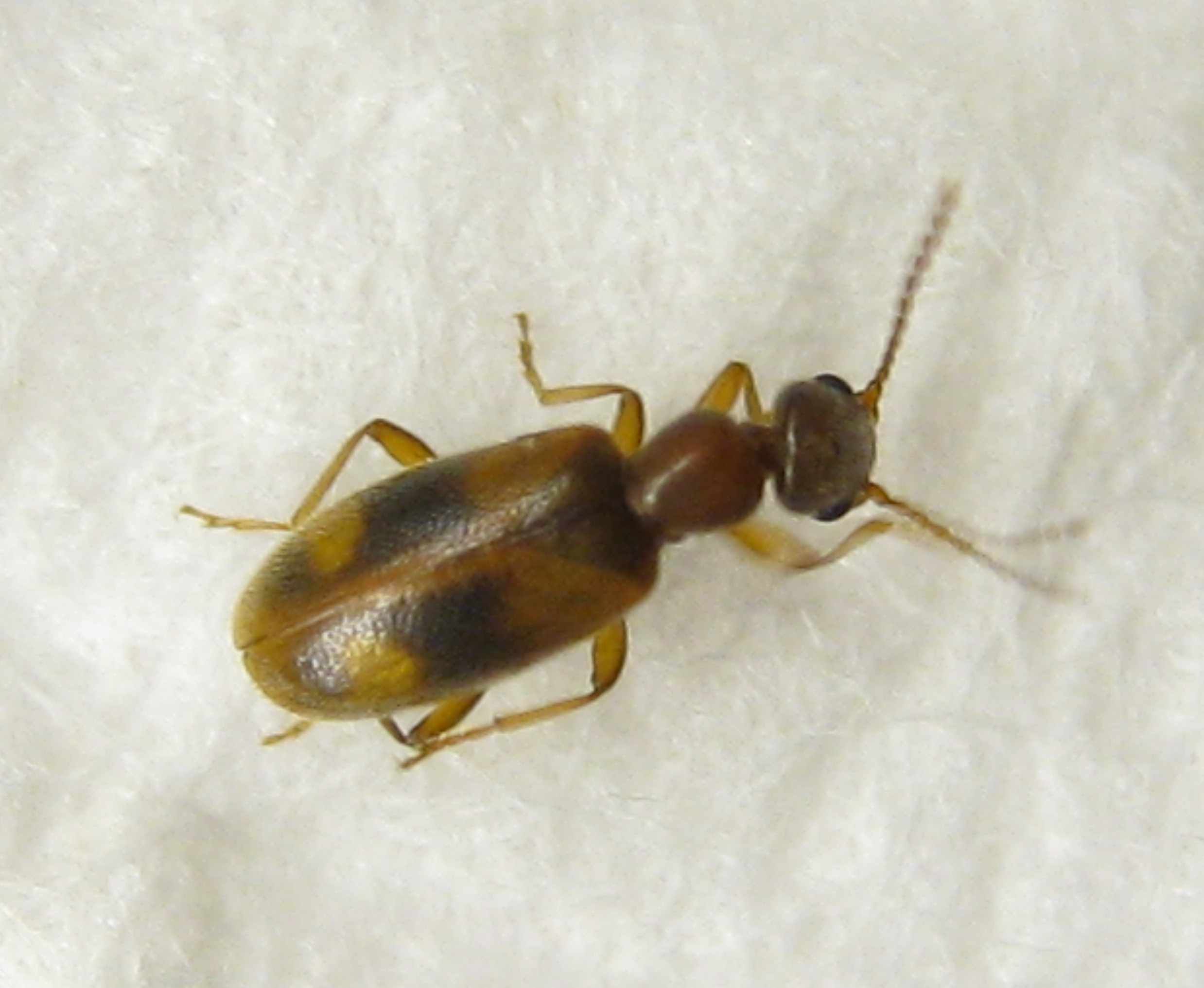
