= Cyclodinus californicus =

Scientific classification
- Kingdom: Animalia
- Phylum: Arthropoda
- Class: Insecta
- Order: Coleoptera
- Suborder: Polyphaga
- Infraorder: Cucujiformia
- Family: Anthicidae
- Genus: Cyclodinus
- Species: C. californicus

Binomial name
- Cyclodinus californicus (LaFerté-Sénectère, 1849)

Synonyms
- Cyclodinus reiectus LeConte, 1852; Cyclodinus texanus (LaFerté-Sénectère, 1849)

Species of beetle

Cyclodinus californicus is a species of antlike flower beetle in the family Anthicidae. It is found in the Caribbean Sea, Central America, and North America.
