= Acanthinus =

Scientific classification
- Kingdom: Animalia
- Phylum: Arthropoda
- Clade: Pancrustacea
- Class: Insecta
- Order: Coleoptera
- Suborder: Polyphaga
- Infraorder: Cucujiformia
- Family: Anthicidae
- Subfamily: Anthicinae
- Genus: Acanthinus; LaFerté-Sénectère, 1849

Synonyms
- Dilandius Casey, 1895; Liobaulius Casey, 1904

Genus of beetles

Acanthinus is a genus of antlike flower beetles in the family Anthicidae. There are around 40 described species in Acanthinus.

== Species ==
These are some of the genus Acanthinus (Caution as bot generated list):

- Acanthinus acutus Werner
- Acanthinus aequinoctialis (LaFerté-Sénectère, 1849)
- Acanthinus argentinus (Argentine anthicid)
- Acanthinus bordoni Werner
- Acanthinus browni Werner
- Acanthinus ceibensis Werner
- Acanthinus chalumeaui Bonadona, 1981
- Acanthinus clavicornis (Champion, 1890)
- Acanthinus continuus Werner
- Acanthinus dromedarius (LaFerté-Sénectère, 1849)
- Acanthinus elegantulus Werner
- Acanthinus exilis (LaFerté-Sénectère, 1849)
- Acanthinus fairchildi Werner
- Acanthinus fastigatus Werner
- Acanthinus formiciformis Werner
- Acanthinus fucosus Werner
- Acanthinus geijskesi Werner
- Acanthinus glareosus Werner, 1966
- Acanthinus harringtoni Werner
- Acanthinus imitans Werner
- Acanthinus invitus Werner
- Acanthinus kraussi Werner
- Acanthinus laevithorax Werner
- Acanthinus lanceatus Werner
- Acanthinus myrmecops (Casey, 1895)
- Acanthinus nevermanni Werner
- Acanthinus parianae Werner
- Acanthinus pilositibia Werner
- Acanthinus quinquemaculatus (LaFerté-Sénectère, 1849)
- Acanthinus rohweri Werner
- Acanthinus schwarzi Werner
- Acanthinus scitulus (LeConte, 1852)
- Acanthinus simplicisternum Werner
- Acanthinus spinicollis (LaFerté-Sénectère, 1849)
- Acanthinus trifasciatus (Fabricius, 1801)
- Acanthinus umbilicatus Chandler
- Acanthinus veracruzensis Werner
- Acanthinus zeteki Werner
