= Qadrius salvus =

Scientific classification
- Kingdom: Animalia
- Phylum: Arthropoda
- Class: Insecta
- Order: Coleoptera
- Suborder: Polyphaga
- Infraorder: Cucujiformia
- Family: Anthicidae
- Genus: Qadrius
- Species: Q. salvus

Binomial name
- Qadrius salvus Abdullah 1964

Species of beetle

Qadrius salvus is a species of beetle in the family Anthicidae.
