= Notoxus anchora =

Scientific classification
- Domain: Eukaryota
- Kingdom: Animalia
- Phylum: Arthropoda
- Class: Insecta
- Order: Coleoptera
- Suborder: Polyphaga
- Infraorder: Cucujiformia
- Family: Anthicidae
- Genus: Notoxus
- Species: N. anchora

Binomial name
- Notoxus anchora Hentz, 1827

Species of beetle

Notoxus anchora is a species of monoceros beetle in the family Anthicidae. It is found in North America.
