= Ischyropalpus bipartitus =

Scientific classification
- Kingdom: Animalia
- Phylum: Arthropoda
- Class: Insecta
- Order: Coleoptera
- Suborder: Polyphaga
- Infraorder: Cucujiformia
- Family: Anthicidae
- Genus: Ischyropalpus
- Species: I. bipartitus

Binomial name
- Ischyropalpus bipartitus (Casey, 1895)

Synonyms
- Lappus bipartitus Casey, 1895

Species of beetle

Ischyropalpus bipartitus is a species of antlike flower beetle, family Anthicidae. It is found in the Southwestern United States (California to Texas) and in Baja California (Mexico).

Ischyropalpus bipartitus measure 2.3–3.2 mm (0.091–0.126 in).
