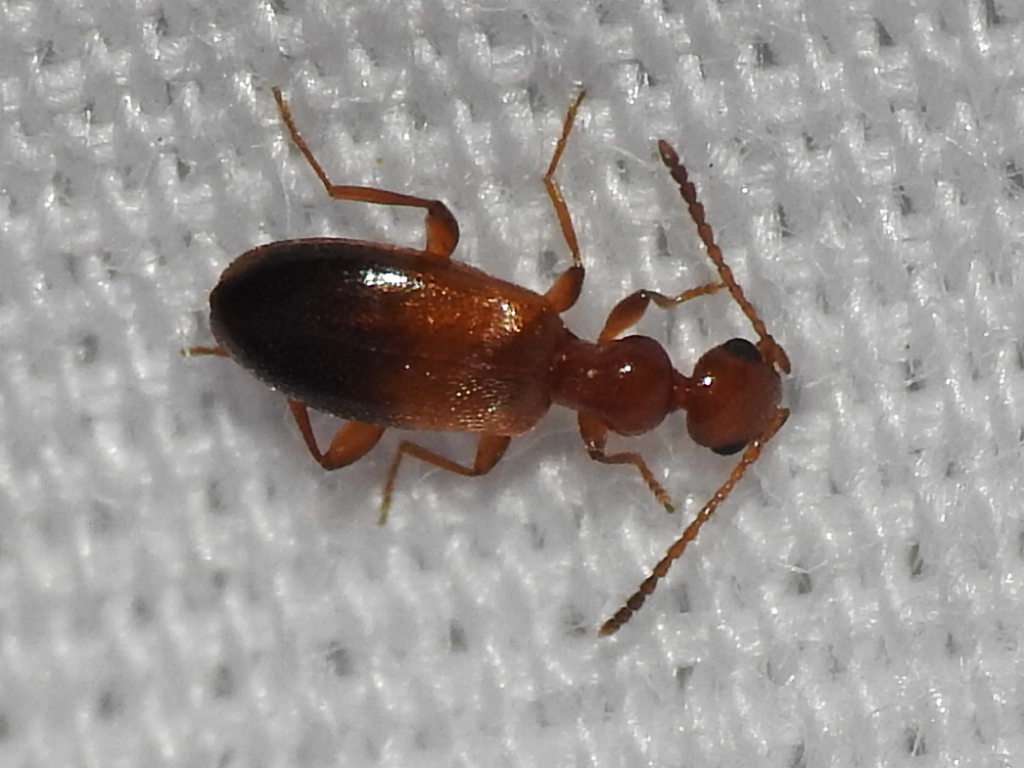

Scientific classification
- Kingdom: Animalia
- Phylum: Arthropoda
- Class: Insecta
- Order: Coleoptera
- Suborder: Polyphaga
- Infraorder: Cucujiformia
- Family: Anthicidae
- Genus: Ischyropalpus
- Species: I. subtilissimus

Binomial name
- Ischyropalpus subtilissimus (Pic, 1896)

Synonyms
- Lappus subtilis Casey, 1895; Lappus lividus Casey, 1895; Ischyropalpus subtilis (Casey, 1895); Anthicus subtilissimus Pic, 1896 – replacement name

= Ischyropalpus subtilissimus =

Species of beetle

Ischyropalpus subtilissimus is a species of antlike flower beetle, family Anthicidae. It is found in the Rocky Mountains and Great Plains of the western United States.

Ischyropalpus subtilissimus measure 2.3–2.7 mm (0.091–0.106 in).
