= Tomoderinae =

Scientific classification
- Kingdom: Animalia
- Phylum: Arthropoda
- Clade: Pancrustacea
- Class: Insecta
- Order: Coleoptera
- Suborder: Polyphaga
- Infraorder: Cucujiformia
- Family: Anthicidae
- Subfamily: Tomoderinae; Bonadona, 1961

Subfamily of beetles

Tomoderinae is a subfamily of ant-like beetles in the family Anthicidae. It was first described by Bondadona in 1961. It contains 3 genera with at least 22 accepted species. The inner taxonomy of this subfamily is still debated among scientists, so various sources may list the number of species as being anywhere from 22-52.

Members of Tomoderinae have been found on nearly every continent. The majority of recorded observations have been made in the United States, Costa Rica, and South Africa.

== Genera ==
- Macrotomoderus
- Pseudotomoderus
- Tomoderus
