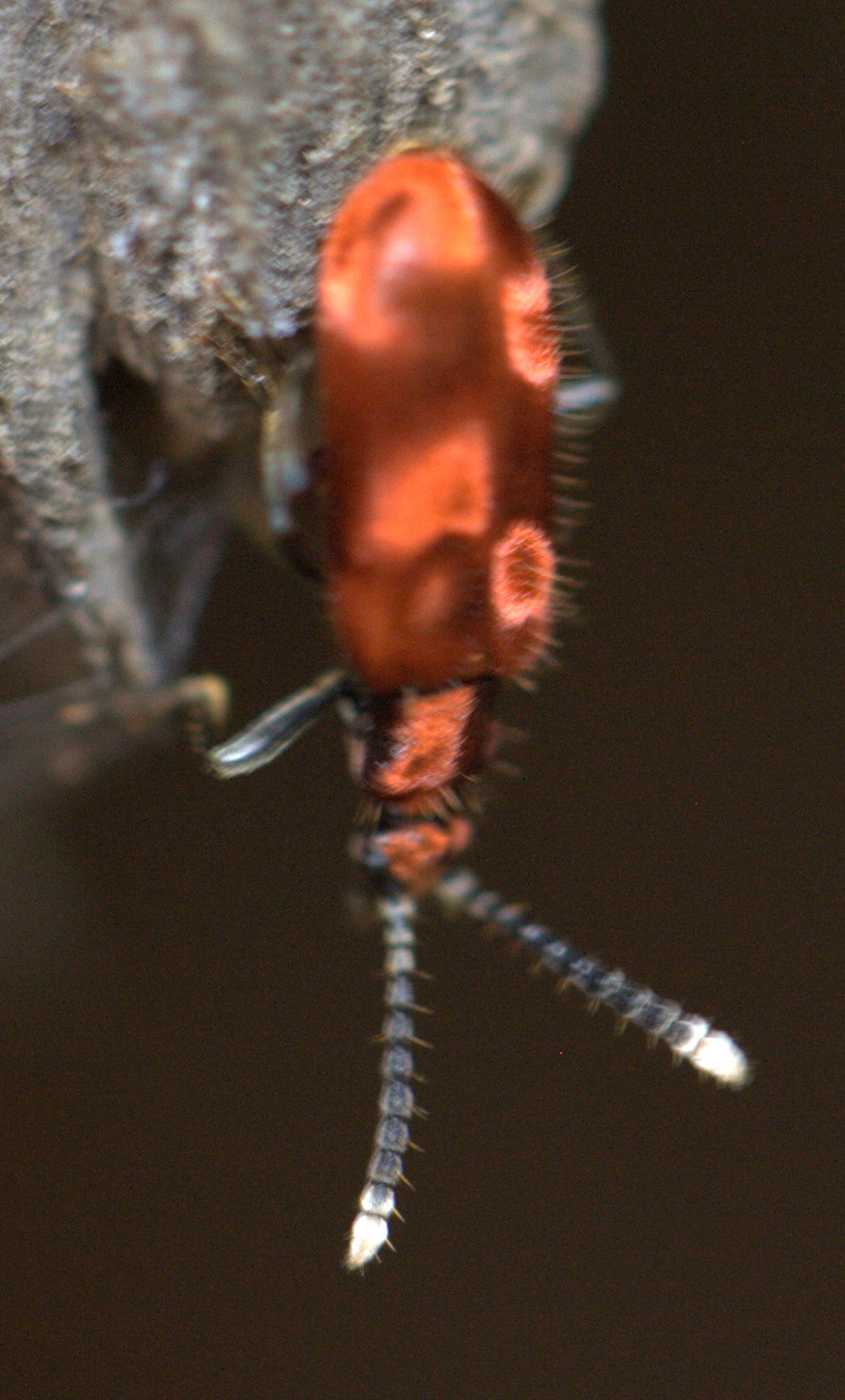
- Lemodes coccinea

Scientific classification
- Kingdom: Animalia
- Phylum: Arthropoda
- Clade: Pancrustacea
- Class: Insecta
- Order: Coleoptera
- Suborder: Polyphaga
- Infraorder: Cucujiformia
- Family: Anthicidae
- Subfamily: Lemodinae; Lawrence & Britton, 1991

Genera
- Cotes; Lemodes; Protoanthicus; Trichananca; Zealanthicus

= Lemodinae =

Subfamily of beetles

Lemodinae is a beetle subfamily in the family Anthicidae.
