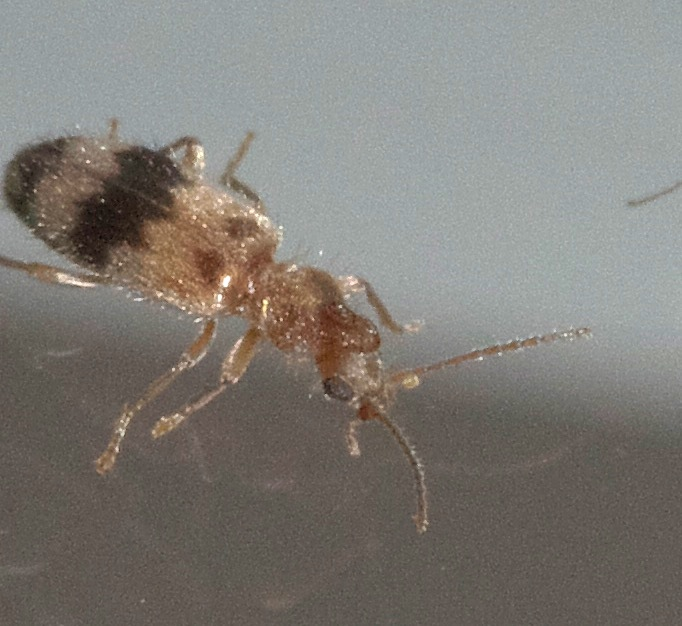
- Notoxus calcaratus

Scientific classification
- Kingdom: Animalia
- Phylum: Arthropoda
- Clade: Pancrustacea
- Class: Insecta
- Order: Coleoptera
- Suborder: Polyphaga
- Infraorder: Cucujiformia
- Family: Anthicidae
- Subfamily: Anthicinae
- Genus: Notoxus; Geoffroy, 1762

Synonyms
- Monocerus Faldermann, 1837

= Notoxus =

Genus of beetles

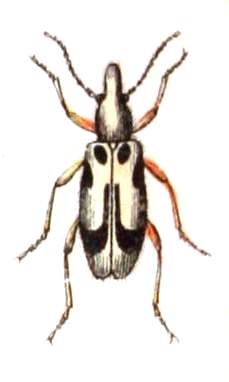
Notoxus monoceros

Notoxus is a large genus of beetles that resemble ants. It comprises about 300 species worldwide.

== Species ==
These species belong to the genus Notoxus:

- Notoxus anchora Hentz, 1827
- Notoxus angustulus Krekich-Strassoldo, 1919
- Notoxus apicalis LeConte, 1852
- Notoxus arizonensis Fall, 1916
- Notoxus balteatus Casey, 1895
- Notoxus beameri Chandler, 2004
- Notoxus bifasciatus (LeConte, 1847)
- Notoxus binotatus (Gebler, 1829)
- Notoxus bipunctatus Chevrolat, 1777
- Notoxus blaisdelli Chandler, 1982
- Notoxus brachycerus (Faldermann, 1837)
- Notoxus brevicornis Fall, 1916
- Notoxus calcaratus Horn, 1884
- Notoxus carrorum Chandler, 2004
- Notoxus caudatus Fall, 1901
- Notoxus cavicornis LeConte, 1851
- Notoxus cavifrons La Ferté-Sénectère, 1849
- Notoxus cechovskyi Kejval, 1999
- Notoxus centralasiae Kejval, 1999
- Notoxus conformis LeConte, 1851
- Notoxus decoloratus LaFerté-Sénectère, 1849
- Notoxus denudatus Horn, 1884
- Notoxus desertus Casey, 1895
- Notoxus distortus Kejval, 2011
- Notoxus doyeni Chandler, 1982
- Notoxus eurycerus von Kiesenwetter, 1861
- Notoxus falli Chandler, 1982
- Notoxus fenyesi Chandler, 1982
- Notoxus filicornis Casey, 1895
- Notoxus garuda Kejval, 2011
- Notoxus gelidus Chandler, 1978
- Notoxus golestanus Kejval, 1999
- Notoxus hageni Chandler, 1982
- Notoxus haustrus Chandler, 1977
- Notoxus hilaris Kejval, 2011
- Notoxus hirsutus Champion, 1890
- Notoxus hirtus La Ferté-Sénectère, 1849
- Notoxus impavidus Kejval, 2011
- Notoxus inbasaliformis Kejval, 2011
- Notoxus intermedius Fall, 1916
- Notoxus iuvenis Kejval, 2011
- Notoxus katthapa Kejval, 2011
- Notoxus lancifer Olivier, 1811
- Notoxus lobicornis Reiche, 1864
- Notoxus lonai Bucciarelli, 1973
- Notoxus lustrellus Casey, 1895
- Notoxus manitoba Chandler, 1982
- Notoxus marginatus LeConte, 1852
- Notoxus mauritanicus La Ferté-Sénectère, 1847
- Notoxus miles W. L. E. Schmidt, 1842
- Notoxus monoceros (Linnaeus, 1761)
- Notoxus monodon (Fabricius, 1801) (antlike flower beetle)
- Notoxus montanus Casey, 1895
- Notoxus montivagus Kejval, 1999
- Notoxus murinipennis (J. E. LeConte, 1824)
- Notoxus nevadensis Casey, 1895
- Notoxus nuperus Horn, 1884
- Notoxus pachodenba Kejval, 2011
- Notoxus paradoxus Chandler, 1982
- Notoxus photus Chandler, 1978
- Notoxus pictus Casey, 1895
- Notoxus pilati LaFerté-Sénectère, 1849
- Notoxus planicornis LaFerté-Sénectère, 1849
- Notoxus politus Chandler, 1982
- Notoxus postictus Chandler, 1978
- Notoxus quadrimaculatus Heyden, 1887
- Notoxus ravana Kejval, 2011
- Notoxus robustus Casey, 1895
- Notoxus rossi Chandler, 1982
- Notoxus rubetorum Truqui, 1855
- Notoxus safraneki Kejval, 2011
- Notoxus sareptanus Heberdey, 1936
- Notoxus schwarzi Horn, 1892
- Notoxus seminole Chandler, 1982
- Notoxus serratus (LeConte, 1847)
- Notoxus siculus La Ferté-Sénectère, 1849
- Notoxus simulans Heberdey, 1935
- Notoxus sodalis Kejval, 2011
- Notoxus sparsus LeConte, 1859
- Notoxus spatulifer Casey, 1895
- Notoxus strejceki Kejval, 1999
- Notoxus subtilis LeConte, 1852
- Notoxus trifasciatus Rossi, 1792
- Notoxus werneri Chandler, 1982
- Notoxus whartoni Chandler, 1982
- Notoxus youngi Chandler, 1982
- Notoxus zambalensis Telnov, 2012
