= Steropinae =

Scientific classification
- Kingdom: Animalia
- Phylum: Arthropoda
- Clade: Pancrustacea
- Class: Insecta
- Order: Coleoptera
- Suborder: Polyphaga
- Infraorder: Cucujiformia
- Family: Anthicidae
- Subfamily: Steropinae; Jacquelin du Val, 1863
- Genus: Steropes; Steven, 1806
- Species: S. caspius

Binomial name
- Steropes caspius Steven, 1806

Subfamily of insects

Steropinae is a subfamily of ant-like beetles in the family Anthicidae. It was first described by Jacquelin du Val in 1863. It contains one genus, Steropes, which was described by Christian Steven in 1806. Steropes contains one provisionally accepted extant species, called Steropes caspius. Observations have been primarily made in Central Asia and the Middle East. Steropes caspius is a nearly microscopic beetle, averaging around 5 mm in length.
