= Copobaeninae =

Scientific classification
- Kingdom: Animalia
- Phylum: Arthropoda
- Clade: Pancrustacea
- Class: Insecta
- Order: Coleoptera
- Suborder: Polyphaga
- Infraorder: Cucujiformia
- Family: Anthicidae
- Subfamily: Copobaeninae; Abdullah, 1969

Subfamily of beetle

Copobaeninae is a subfamily of ant-like beetles in the family Anthicidae. It was first described by M. Abdullah in 1969. It contains four genera, with 5 accepted species, and 1 provisionally accepted species.

== Genera and species ==
- Copobaenus
  - Copobaenus bicoloratus
  - Copobaenus cheesmanae
  - Copobaenus erratus
  - Copobaenus novacaledonicus
  - Copobaenus tristis
- Cotes
- Lemodinus
- Zealanthicus
  - Zealanthicus sulcatus (provisionally accepted)
