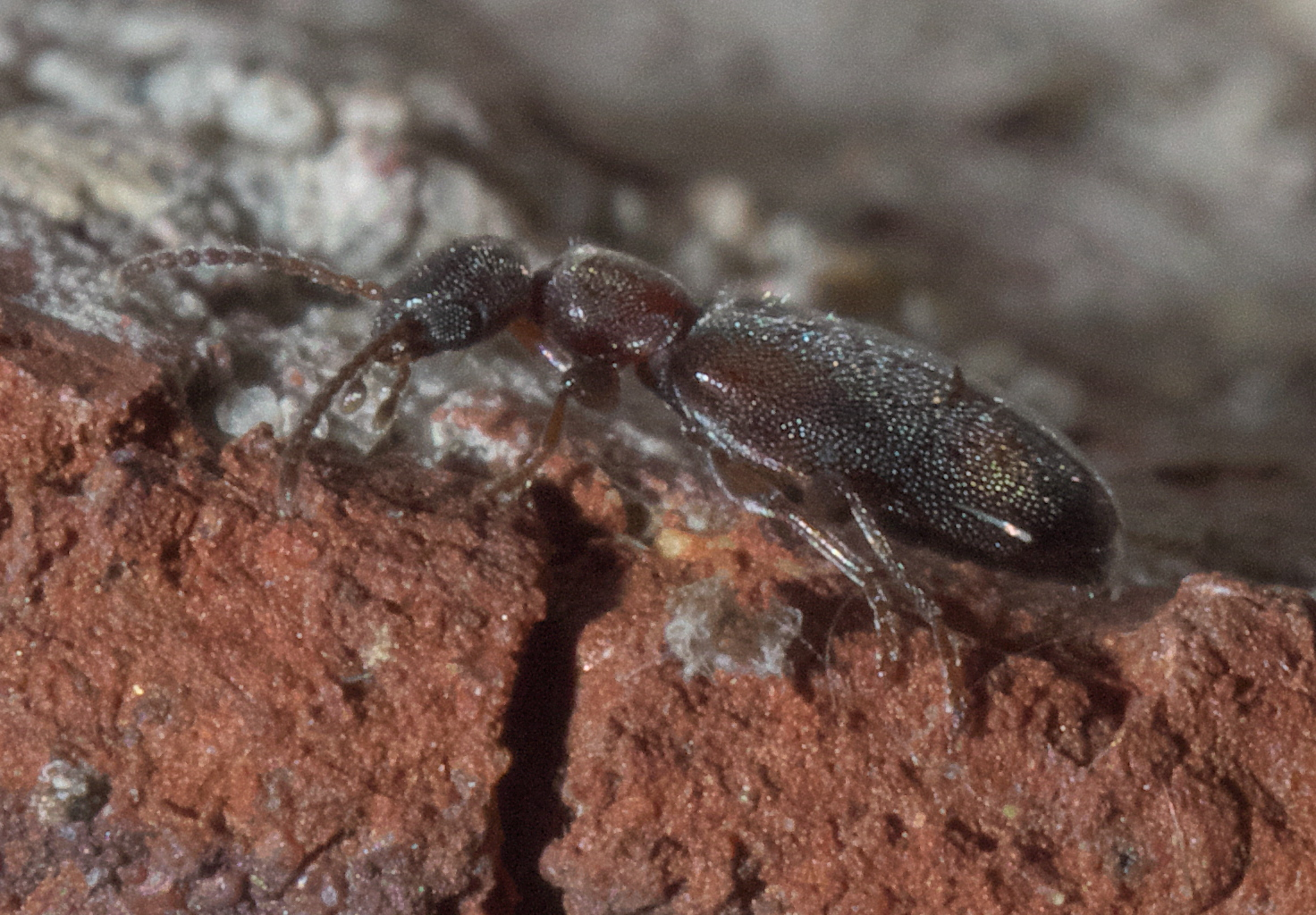
- Anthicus cervinus

Scientific classification
- Kingdom: Animalia
- Phylum: Arthropoda
- Clade: Pancrustacea
- Class: Insecta
- Order: Coleoptera
- Suborder: Polyphaga
- Infraorder: Cucujiformia
- Family: Anthicidae
- Subfamily: Anthicinae
- Genus: Anthicus; Paykull, 1798

Synonyms
- Nathicus Casey, 1895

= Anthicus =

Genus of beetles

Anthicus is a genus of antlike flower beetles in the family Anthicidae. There are at least 100 described species in Anthicus.

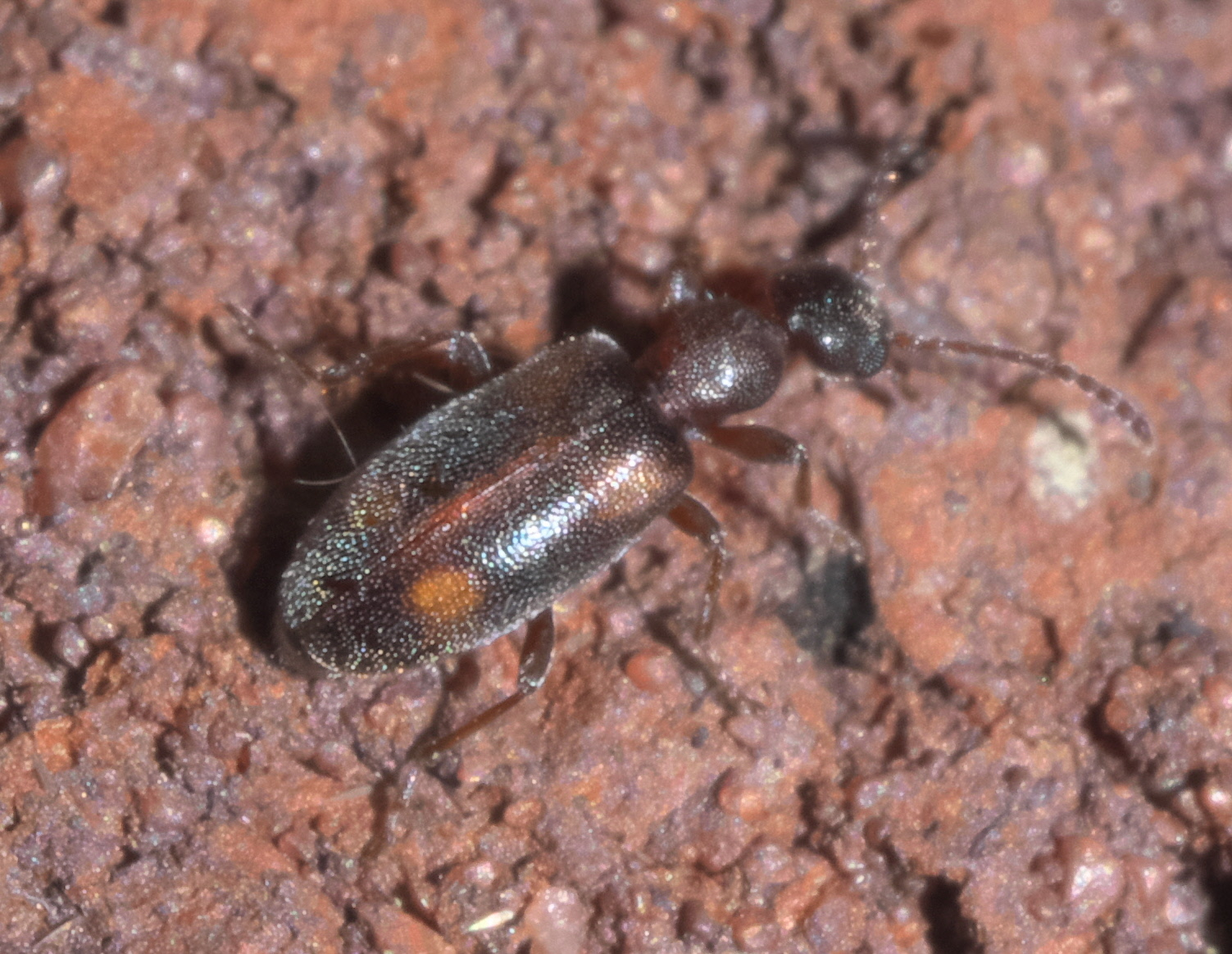
Anthicus cervinus

== See also ==
- List of Anthicus species
