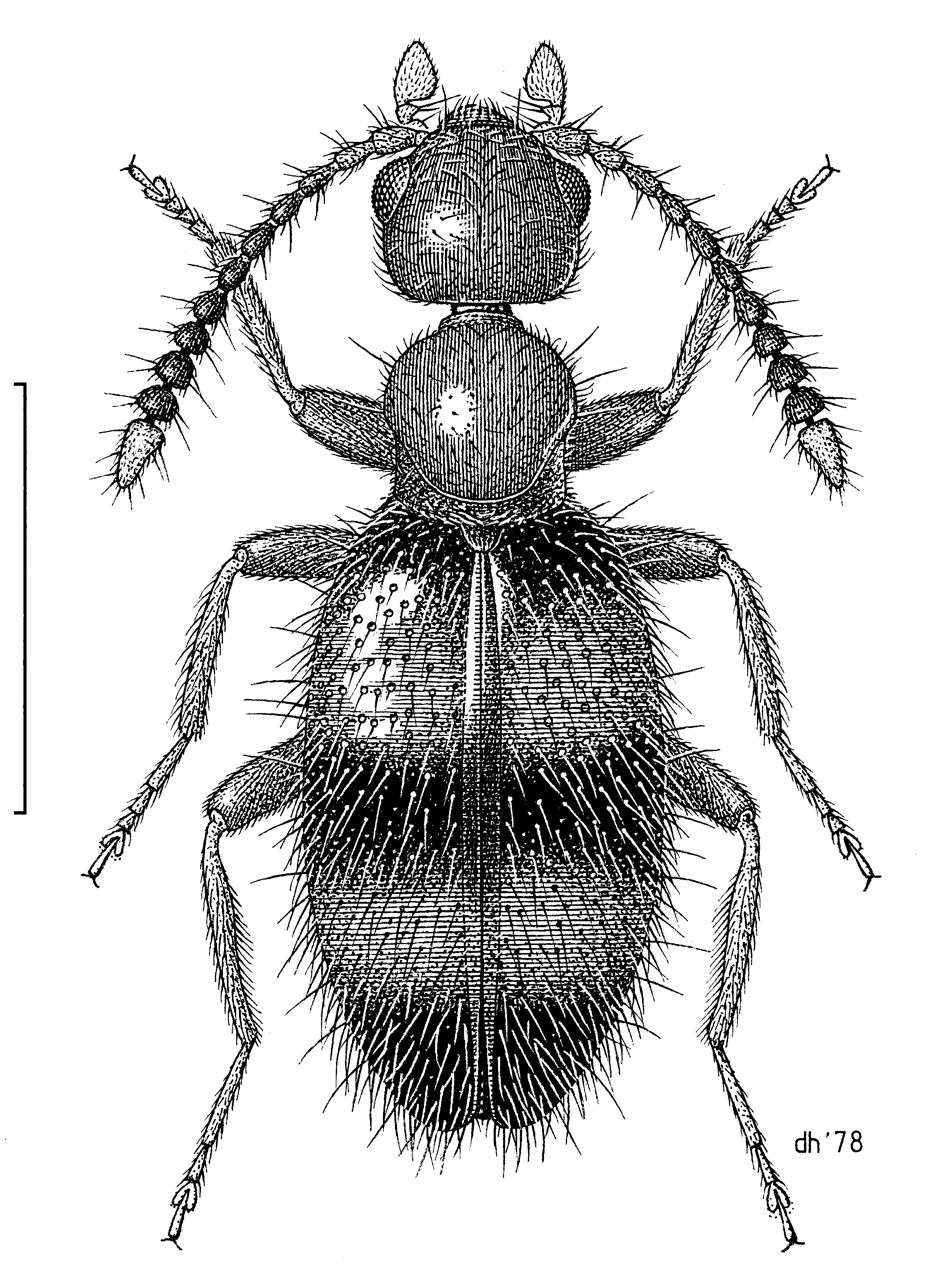
- Anthicus sp. male

Scientific classification
- Kingdom: Animalia
- Phylum: Arthropoda
- Clade: Pancrustacea
- Class: Insecta
- Order: Coleoptera
- Suborder: Polyphaga
- Infraorder: Cucujiformia
- Superfamily: Tenebrionoidea
- Family: Anthicidae; Latreille, 1819

Subfamilies
- Anthicinae; Copobaeninae; Eurygeniinae; Ischaliinae; Lemodinae; Macratriinae; Steropinae; Tomoderinae

= Anthicidae =

Anthicidae Temporal range: Early Cretaceous–Recent

Family of beetles

The Anthicidae are a family of beetles that resemble ants. They are sometimes called ant-like flower beetles or ant-like beetles. The family comprises over 3,500 species in about 100 genera.

== Description ==
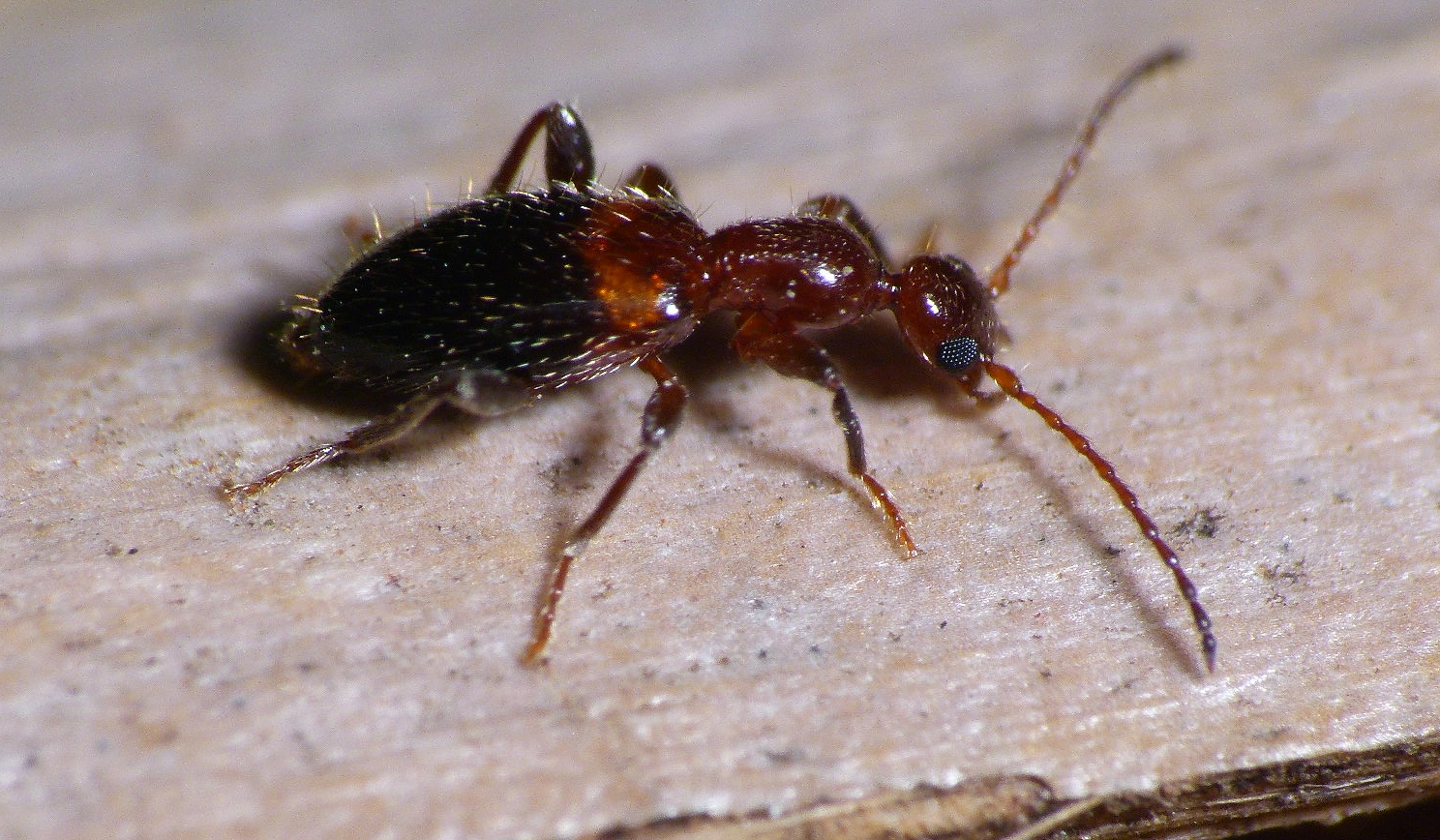
Profile of an anthicid

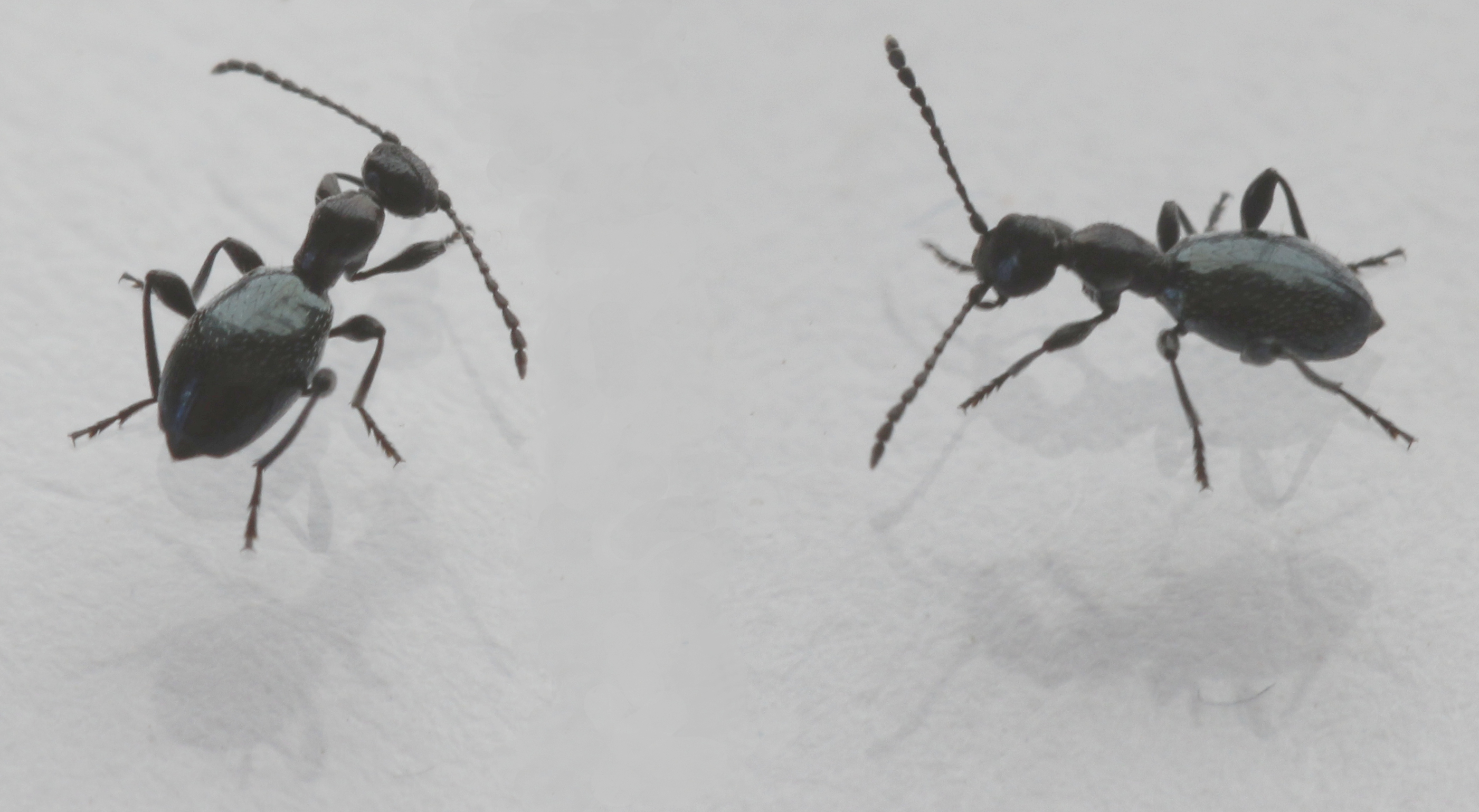
Members of the genus Anthelephila are ant-like in superficial appearance.

Their heads constrict just in front of the pronotum, forming a neck, and the posterior end of the pronotum is usually narrow as well. Legs and antennae are slender, heightening the ant-like appearance, and the body is sparsely covered with small hairs, called setae.

== Biology ==
Adult beetles are omnivorous, being known to consume small arthropods, pollen, fungi, and whatever else they can find. Some species are of interest as biological control agents, as they can eat the eggs or larvae of pests. Larvae are either omnivorous, predators, or fungus-eaters; the young of one species of Notoxus have been observed boring into sweet potato tubers.

Many members of the family are attracted to cantharidin, which they seem to accumulate and that deters possible predators.

== Taxonomy ==
Synonyms of the family include Notoxidae and Ischaliidae. The earliest known members of the family are from the Early Cretaceous (Barremian) aged Lebanese amber, including Camelomorpha of the subfamily Macratriinae.
