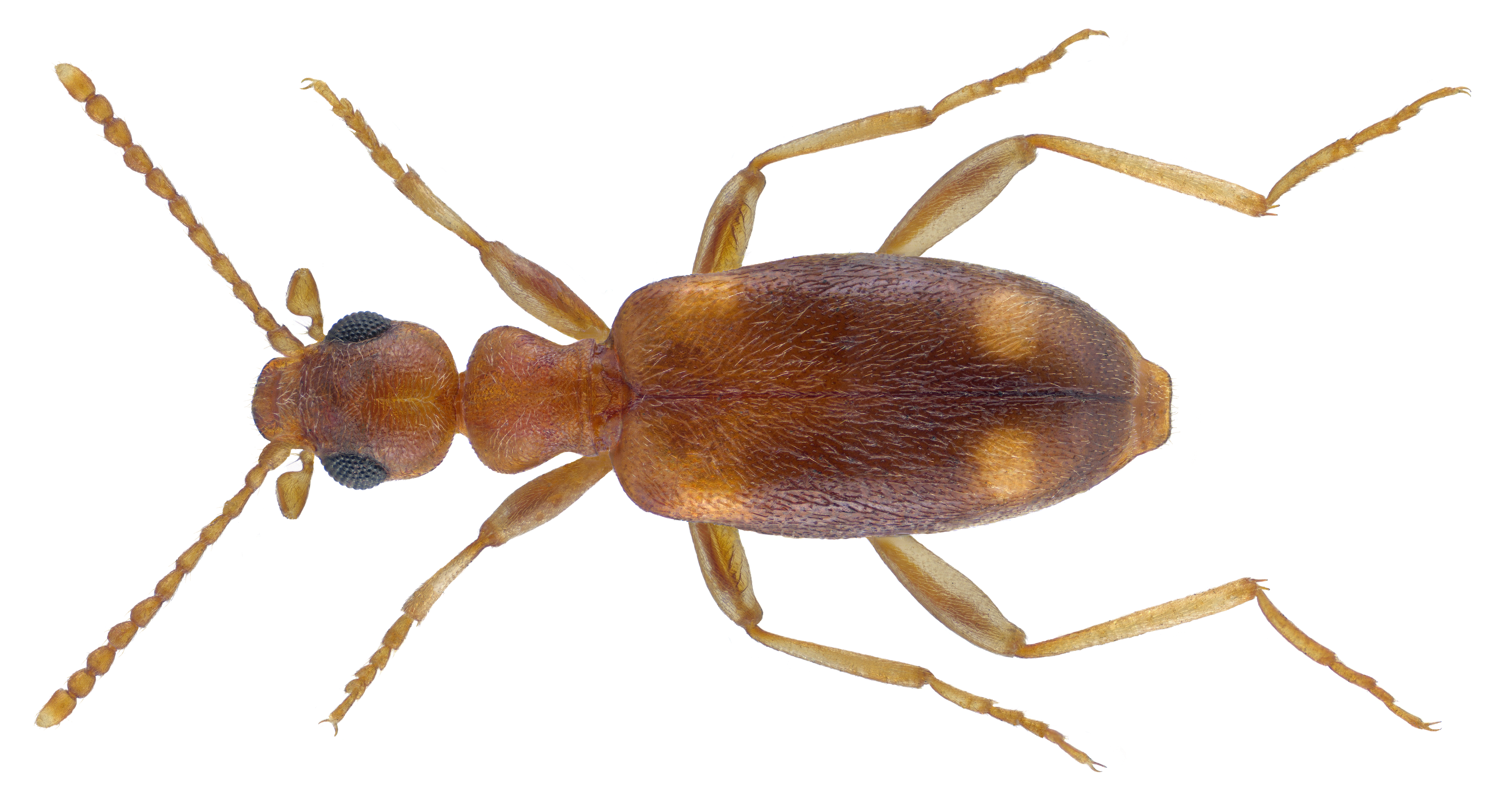
- Stricticollis

Scientific classification
- Kingdom: Animalia
- Phylum: Arthropoda
- Clade: Pancrustacea
- Class: Insecta
- Order: Coleoptera
- Suborder: Polyphaga
- Infraorder: Cucujiformia
- Family: Anthicidae
- Subfamily: Anthicinae; Latreille, 1819

Synonyms
- Notoxinae Stephens, 1829

= Anthicinae =

Subfamily of beetles

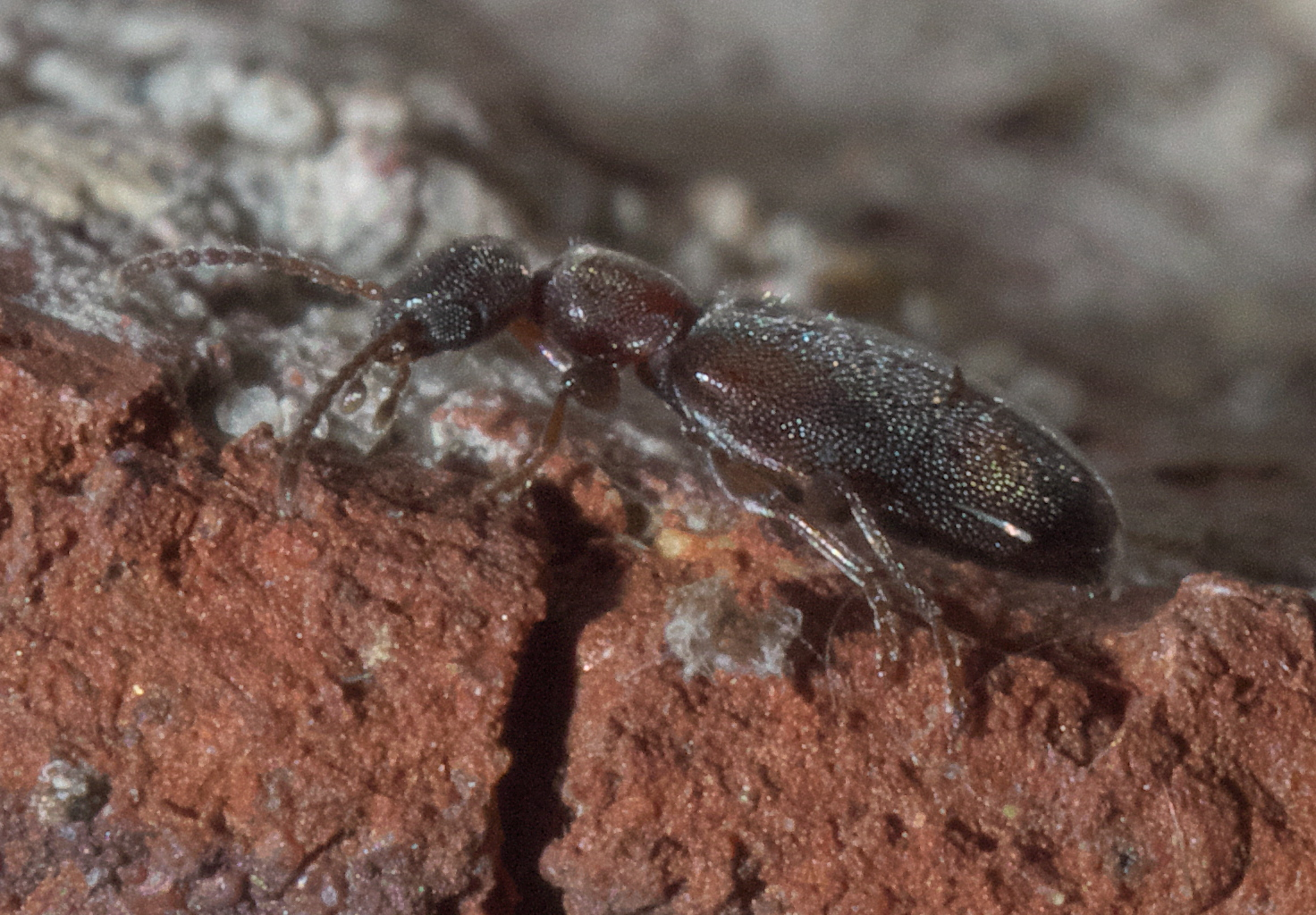
Anthicus cervinus

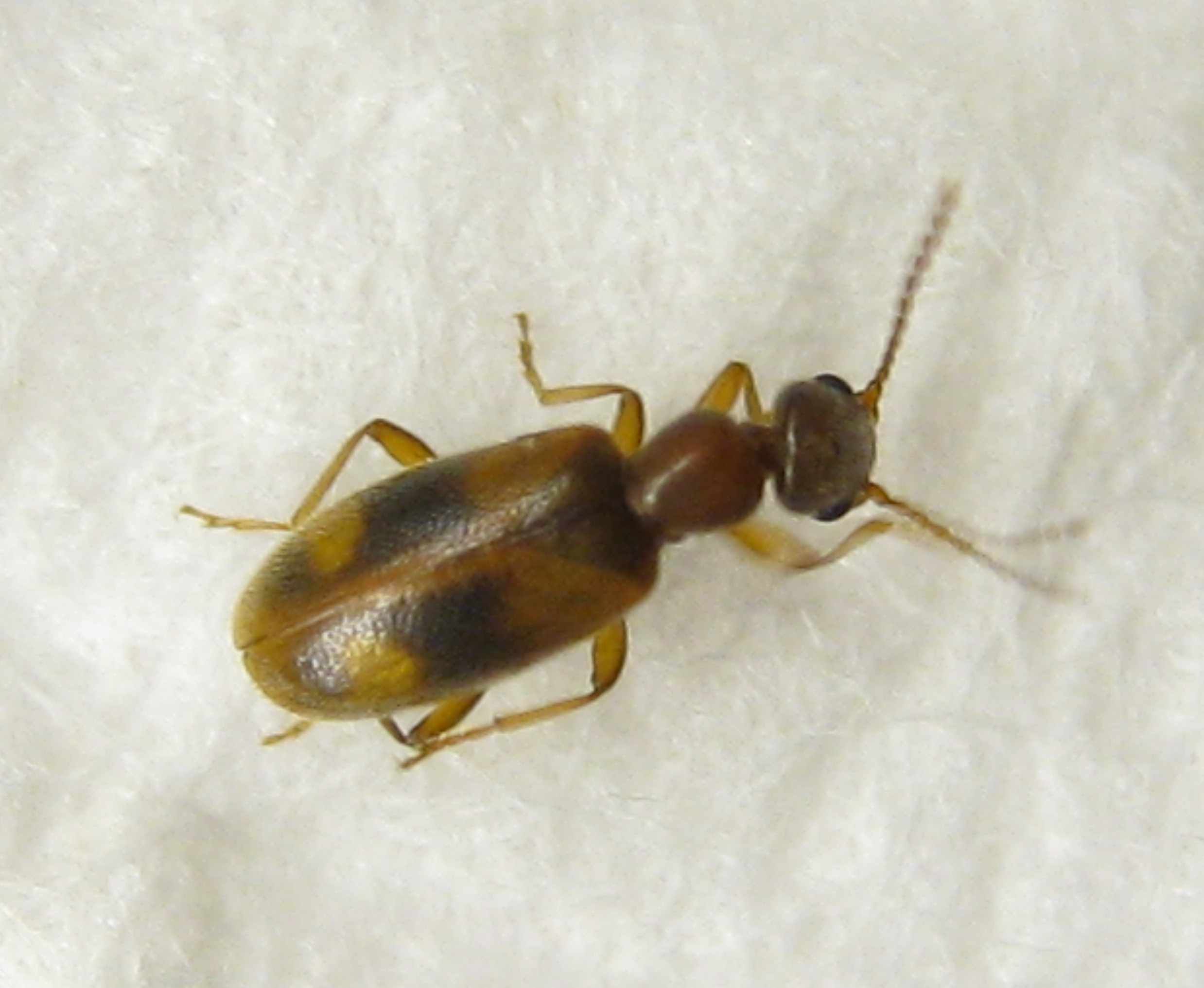
Anthicus cervinus

Anthicinae is a subfamily of ant-like flower beetles in the family Anthicidae.

== Genera ==
These 38 genera belong to the subfamily Anthicinae:

- Acanthinus LaFerté-Sénectère, 1849^{i c g b}
- Amblyderus LaFerté-Sénectère, 1849^{i c g b}
- Andrahomanus Pic, 1903^{g}
- Anthelephila Hope, 1833^{i c g}
- Anthicomorphus Lewis, 1895^{g}
- Anthicus Paykull, 1798^{i c g b}
- Aulacoderus La Ferte-Senectere, 1849^{g}
- Baulius Casey, 1895^{i c g}
- Chileanthicus Werner, 1966^{g}
- Clavicollis Marseul, 1879^{g}
- Cordicollis Marseul, 1879^{g}
- Cyclodinus Mulsant & Rey, 1866^{i c g b}
- Endomia LaPorte de Castelnau, 1840^{g}
- Euvacusus Casey, 1904^{i c g b}
- Floydwernerius Telnov, 2007
- Formicilla LeConte, 1851^{i c g b}
- Hirticollis Marseul, 1879^{g}
- Hirticomus Pic, 1894^{g}
- Ischyropalpus LaFerté-Sénectère, 1849^{i c g b}
- Leptaleus La Ferté-Sénectère, 1849^{g}
- Leptanthicus Werner, 1958^{i c g b}
- Liparoderus La Ferté-Sénectère, 1849^{g}
- Malporus Casey, 1895^{i c g b}
- Mecynotarsus LaFerté-Sénectère, 1847^{i c g b}
- Microhoria Chevrolat, 1877^{g}
- Nitorus Telnov, 2007^{g}
- Notoxus Geoffroy, 1762^{i c g b}
- Omonadus Mulsant & Rey, 1866^{i c g b}
- Pseudocyclodinus Telnov, 2003^{g}
- Pseudoleptaleus Pic, 1901^{g}
- Sapintus Casey, 1895^{i c g b}
- Squamanotoxus Chandler, 2001^{i c g b}
- Stenidius La Ferte-Senectere, 1847^{g}
- Stricticollis Marseul, 1879^{g b}
- Tanarthrus LeConte, 1851^{i c g b}
- Tenuicomus Pic, 1894^{g}
- Vacusus Casey, 1895^{i c g b}
- Yunnanomonticola Telnov, 2002

Data sources: i = ITIS, c = Catalogue of Life, g = GBIF, b = Bugguide.net
