= Formicilla munda =

Scientific classification
- Kingdom: Animalia
- Phylum: Arthropoda
- Class: Insecta
- Order: Coleoptera
- Suborder: Polyphaga
- Infraorder: Cucujiformia
- Family: Anthicidae
- Subfamily: Anthicinae
- Genus: Formicilla
- Species: F. munda

Binomial name
- Formicilla munda LeConte, 1852

Synonyms
- Formicilla evanescens Casey, 1895; Formicilla gilensis Casey, 1895

Species of beetle

Formicilla munda is a species of antlike flower beetle in the family Anthicidae. It is found in Central America and North America.
