= Formicilla =

Scientific classification
- Kingdom: Animalia
- Phylum: Arthropoda
- Clade: Pancrustacea
- Class: Insecta
- Order: Coleoptera
- Suborder: Polyphaga
- Infraorder: Cucujiformia
- Family: Anthicidae
- Subfamily: Anthicinae
- Genus: Formicilla; LeConte, 1851

Genus of beetles

Formicilla is a genus of antlike flower beetles in the family Anthicidae. There are at least three described species in Formicilla, found in Central and North America.

== Species ==
These three species belong to the genus Formicilla:

- Formicilla coniceps Pic, 1937
- Formicilla leporina LaFerté, 1849
- Formicilla munda LeConte, 1852
