= Mecynotarsus candidus =

Scientific classification
- Kingdom: Animalia
- Phylum: Arthropoda
- Class: Insecta
- Order: Coleoptera
- Suborder: Polyphaga
- Infraorder: Cucujiformia
- Family: Anthicidae
- Genus: Mecynotarsus
- Species: M. candidus

Binomial name
- Mecynotarsus candidus LeConte, 1875

Synonyms
- Mecynotarsus flavicans Casey, 1895

Species of beetle

Mecynotarsus candidus is a species of monoceros beetle in the family Anthicidae. It is found in Central America and North America.
