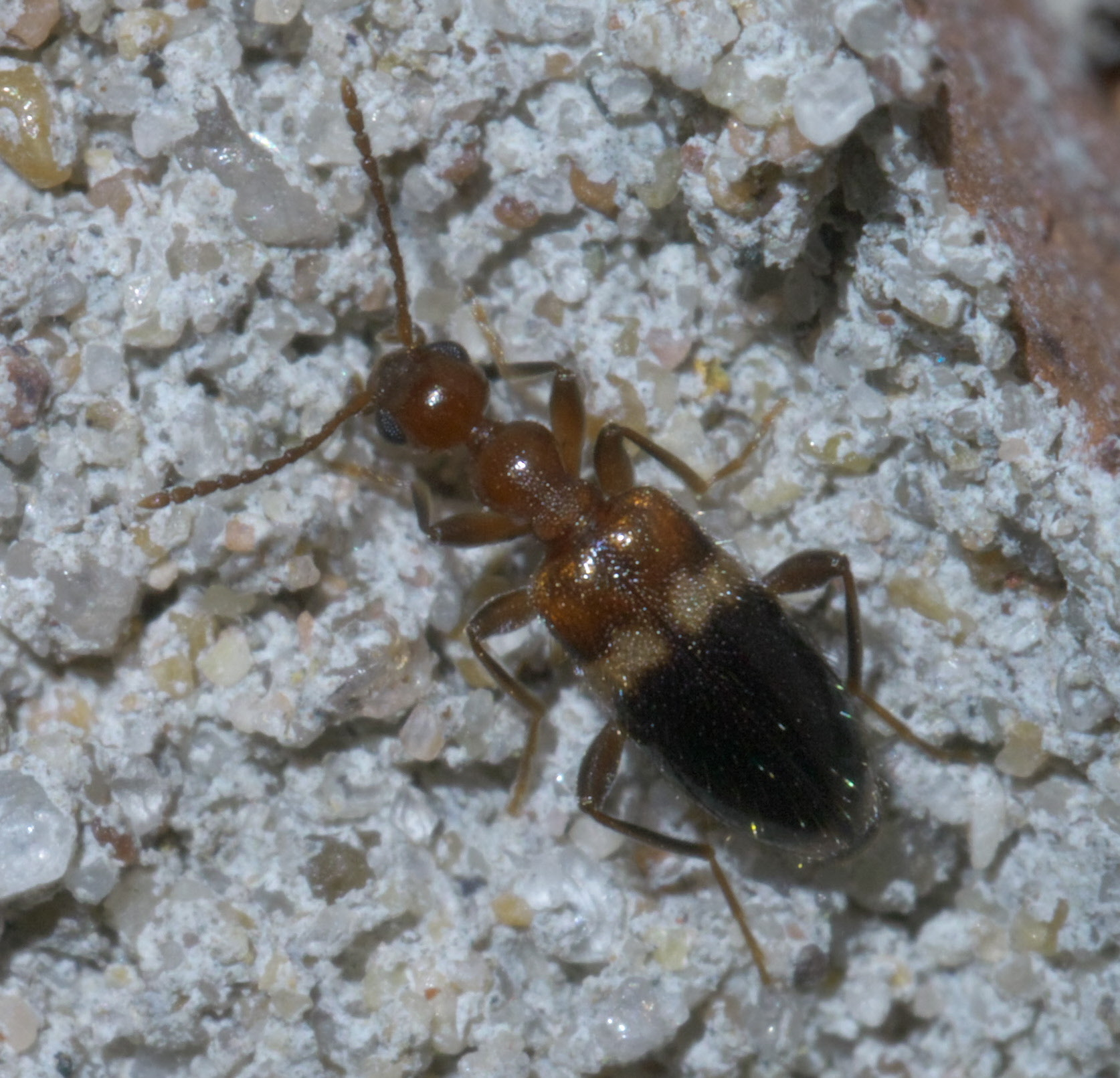

Scientific classification
- Domain: Eukaryota
- Kingdom: Animalia
- Phylum: Arthropoda
- Class: Insecta
- Order: Coleoptera
- Suborder: Polyphaga
- Infraorder: Cucujiformia
- Family: Anthicidae
- Genus: Malporus
- Species: M. cinctus

Binomial name
- Malporus cinctus (Say, 1824)

= Malporus cinctus =

Species of beetle

Malporus cinctus is a species of antlike flower beetle in the family Anthicidae. It is found in North America.

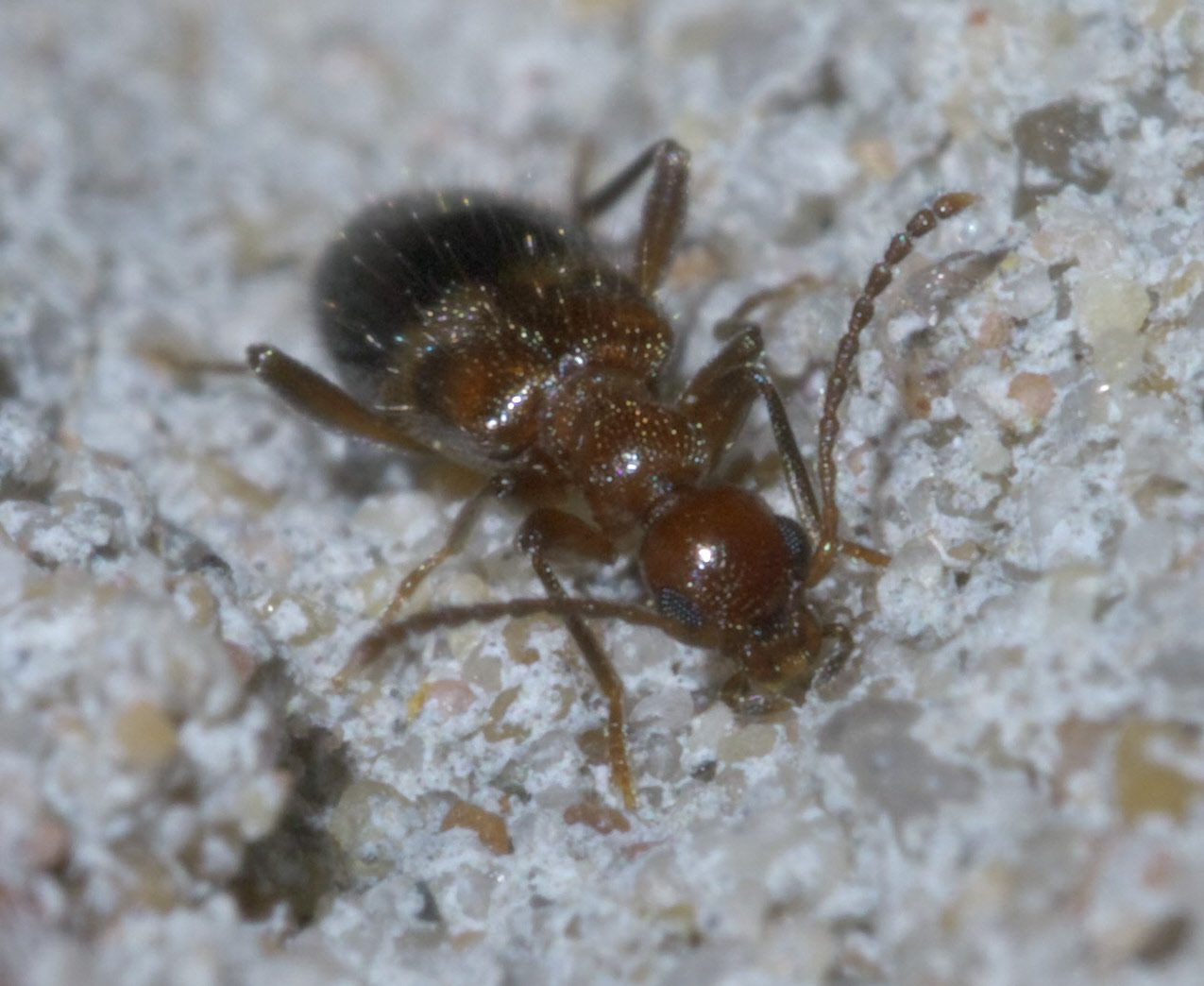
