= Tanarthrus salicola =

Scientific classification
- Kingdom: Animalia
- Phylum: Arthropoda
- Class: Insecta
- Order: Coleoptera
- Suborder: Polyphaga
- Infraorder: Cucujiformia
- Family: Anthicidae
- Genus: Tanarthrus
- Species: T. salicola

Binomial name
- Tanarthrus salicola LeConte, 1875

Synonyms
- Tanarthrus densus Casey, 1895; Tanarthrus mormon Wickham, 1906; Tanarthrus nubifer Casey, 1895; Tanarthrus tricolor Casey, 1895; Tanarthrus virginalis Wickham, 1906

Species of beetle

Tanarthrus salicola is a species of antlike flower beetle in the family Anthicidae. It is found in North America.
