= Tanarthrus andrewsi =

Scientific classification
- Domain: Eukaryota
- Kingdom: Animalia
- Phylum: Arthropoda
- Class: Insecta
- Order: Coleoptera
- Suborder: Polyphaga
- Infraorder: Cucujiformia
- Family: Anthicidae
- Genus: Tanarthrus
- Species: T. andrewsi

Binomial name
- Tanarthrus andrewsi Chandler, 1984

Species of beetle

Tanarthrus andrewsi is a species of antlike flower beetle in the family Anthicidae. It is found in North America.
