= Squamanotoxus elegans =

Scientific classification
- Kingdom: Animalia
- Phylum: Arthropoda
- Class: Insecta
- Order: Coleoptera
- Suborder: Polyphaga
- Infraorder: Cucujiformia
- Family: Anthicidae
- Genus: Squamanotoxus
- Species: S. elegans

Binomial name
- Squamanotoxus elegans (LeConte, 1875)

Synonyms
- Mecynotarsus elegans LeConte, 1875; Squamanotoxus falcatus Chandler, 1977

Species of beetle

Squamanotoxus elegans is a species of monoceros beetle in the family Anthicidae. It is found in North America.
