= Vacusus =

Scientific classification
- Kingdom: Animalia
- Phylum: Arthropoda
- Clade: Pancrustacea
- Class: Insecta
- Order: Coleoptera
- Suborder: Polyphaga
- Infraorder: Cucujiformia
- Family: Anthicidae
- Subfamily: Anthicinae
- Genus: Vacusus; Casey, 1895

Genus of beetles

Vacusus is a genus of antlike flower beetles in the family Anthicidae. There are about six described species in Vacusus.

== Species ==
These six species belong to the genus Vacusus:

- Vacusus confinis (LeConte, 1851)
- Vacusus formicetorum (Wasmann, 1894)
- Vacusus infernus (LaFerté-Sénectère, 1849)
- Vacusus jamaicanus Werner
- Vacusus nigritulus (LeConte, 1851)
- Vacusus vicinus (LaFerté-Sénectère, 1849)
