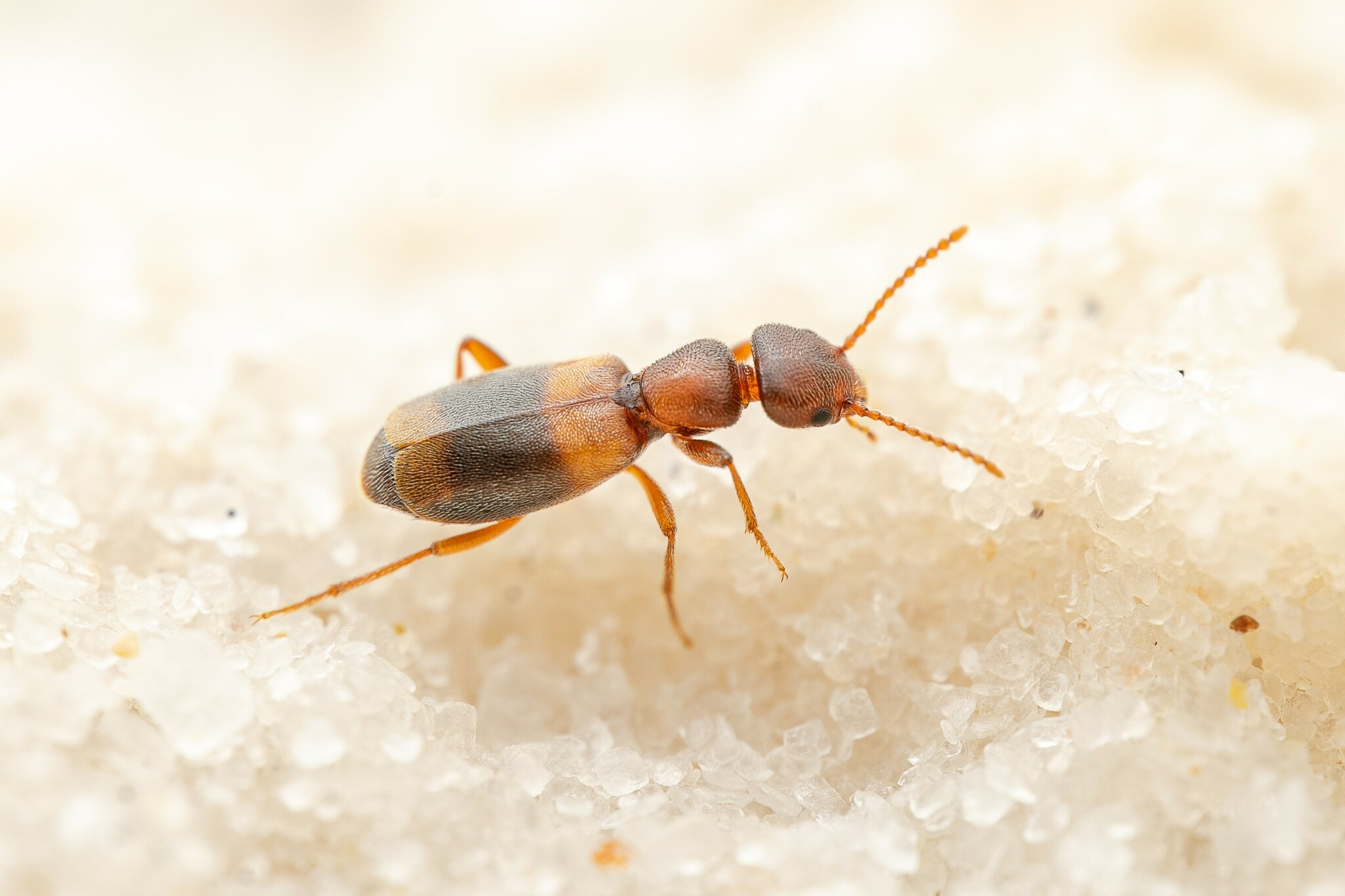
- Tanarthrus brevipennis

Scientific classification
- Kingdom: Animalia
- Phylum: Arthropoda
- Clade: Pancrustacea
- Class: Insecta
- Order: Coleoptera
- Suborder: Polyphaga
- Infraorder: Cucujiformia
- Family: Anthicidae
- Subfamily: Anthicinae
- Genus: Tanarthrus; LeConte, 1851

Subgenera
- Tanarthrus (Tanarthropsis) Casey, 1895; Tanarthrus (Tanarthrus) LeConte, 1851

= Tanarthrus =

Genus of beetles

Tanarthrus is a genus of antlike flower beetles in the family Anthicidae. There are about 15 described species in the genus Tanarthrus.

== Species ==
These 15 species belong to the genus Tanarthrus:

- Tanarthrus alutaceus (LeConte, 1852)
- Tanarthrus andrewsi Chandler, 1984
- Tanarthrus brevipennis Casey, 1895
- Tanarthrus cochisus Chandler, 1975
- Tanarthrus coruscus Chandler, 1975
- Tanarthrus eximius Chandler, 1975
- Tanarthrus inhabilis Chandler, 1975
- Tanarthrus inyo Wickham, 1906
- Tanarthrus iselini Chandler, 1975
- Tanarthrus occidentalis Chandler, 1979
- Tanarthrus quitobaquito Chandler, 1975
- Tanarthrus salicola LeConte, 1875
- Tanarthrus salinus LeConte, 1851
- Tanarthrus tartarus Chandler, 1975
- Tanarthrus vafer Chandler, 1975
