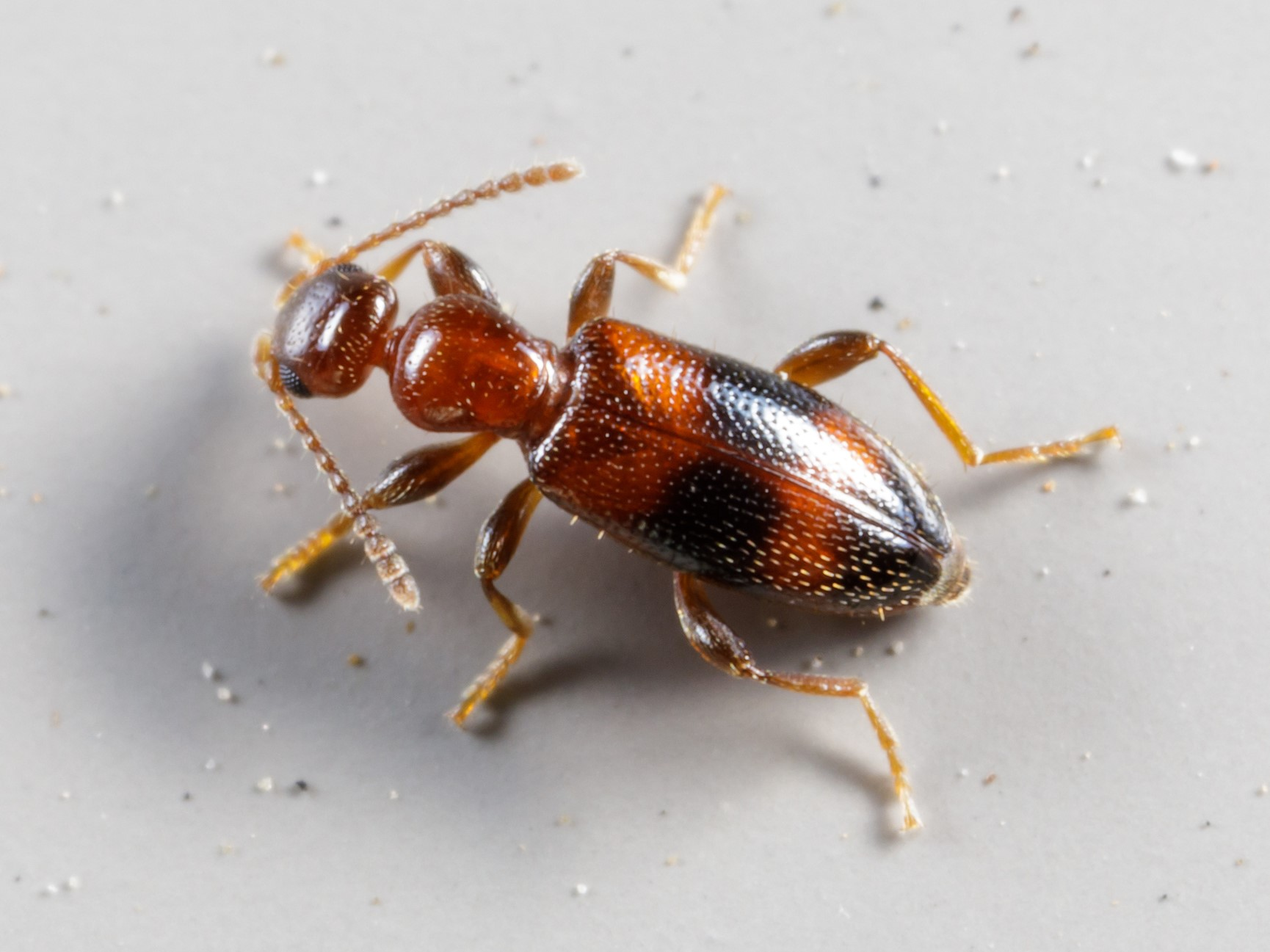

Scientific classification
- Kingdom: Animalia
- Phylum: Arthropoda
- Class: Insecta
- Order: Coleoptera
- Suborder: Polyphaga
- Infraorder: Cucujiformia
- Family: Anthicidae
- Genus: Vacusus
- Species: V. vicinus

Binomial name
- Vacusus vicinus (LaFerté-Sénectère, 1849)

Synonyms
- Vacusus fulvomicans Quedenfeldt, 1886; Vacusus loetus LaFerté-Sénectère, 1849; Vacusus monitor Casey, 1895; Vacusus supplex Casey, 1895; Vacusus thoracicus LaFerté-Sénectère, 1849

= Vacusus vicinus =

Species of beetle

Vacusus vicinus is a species of antlike flower beetle in the family Anthicidae. It is found in the Caribbean Sea, Central America, North America, Oceania, and South America.
