= Mecynotarsus delicatulus =

Scientific classification
- Domain: Eukaryota
- Kingdom: Animalia
- Phylum: Arthropoda
- Class: Insecta
- Order: Coleoptera
- Suborder: Polyphaga
- Infraorder: Cucujiformia
- Family: Anthicidae
- Genus: Mecynotarsus
- Species: M. delicatulus

Binomial name
- Mecynotarsus delicatulus Horn, 1868

Species of beetle

Mecynotarsus delicatulus is a species of monoceros beetle in the family Anthicidae. It is found in Central America and North America.
