= Squamanotoxus balsasensis =

Scientific classification
- Domain: Eukaryota
- Kingdom: Animalia
- Phylum: Arthropoda
- Class: Insecta
- Order: Coleoptera
- Suborder: Polyphaga
- Infraorder: Cucujiformia
- Family: Anthicidae
- Genus: Squamanotoxus
- Species: S. balsasensis

Binomial name
- Squamanotoxus balsasensis (Werner, 1962)

Synonyms
- Squamanotoxus salvadorensis Werner, 1962

Species of beetle

Squamanotoxus balsasensis is a species of monoceros beetle in the family Anthicidae. It is found in Central America and North America.
