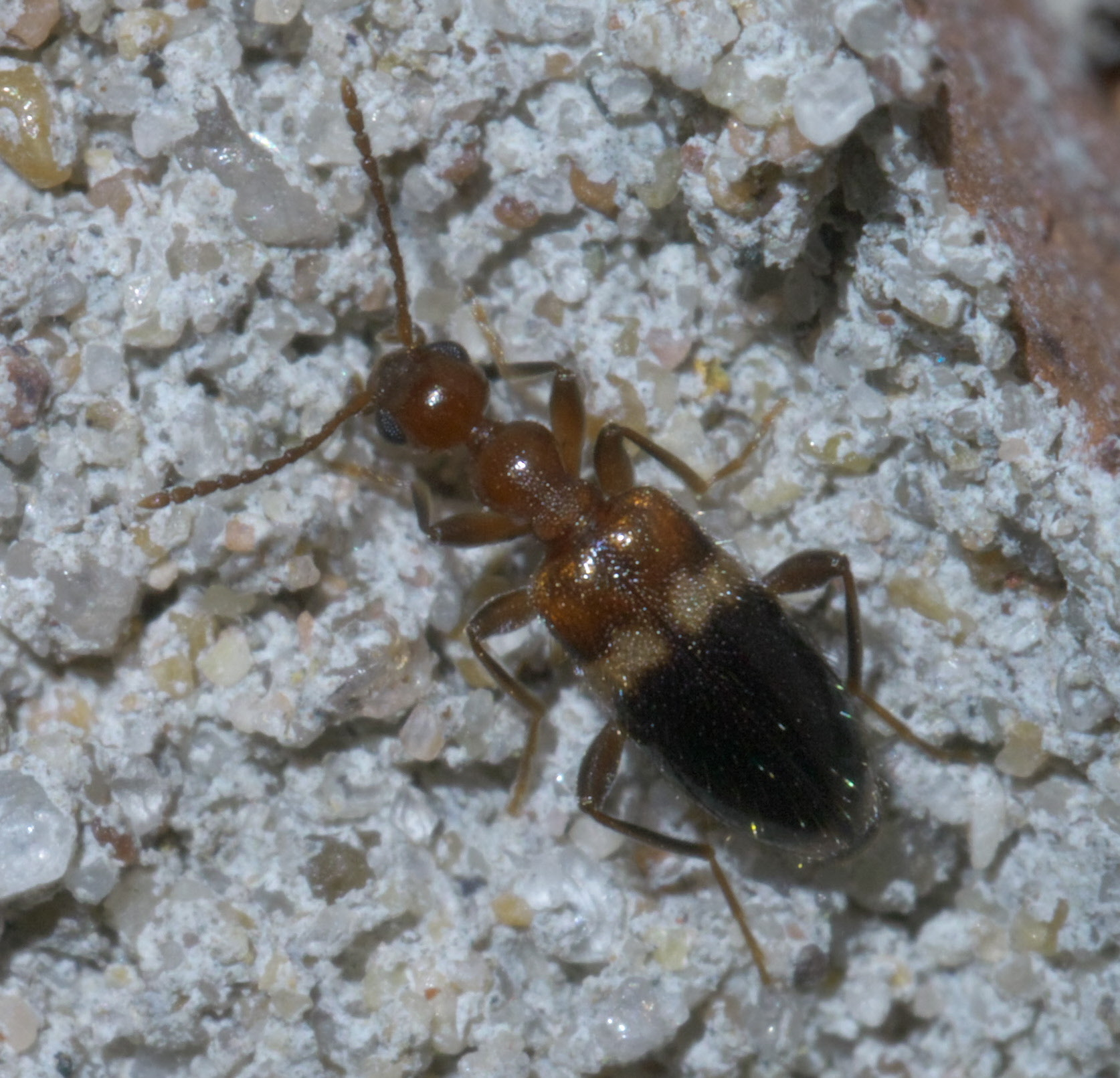
- Malporus cinctus

Scientific classification
- Kingdom: Animalia
- Phylum: Arthropoda
- Clade: Pancrustacea
- Class: Insecta
- Order: Coleoptera
- Suborder: Polyphaga
- Infraorder: Cucujiformia
- Family: Anthicidae
- Subfamily: Anthicinae
- Genus: Malporus; Casey, 1895

= Malporus =

Genus of beetles

Malporus is a genus of antlike flower beetles in the family Anthicidae. There are at least four described species in Malporus.

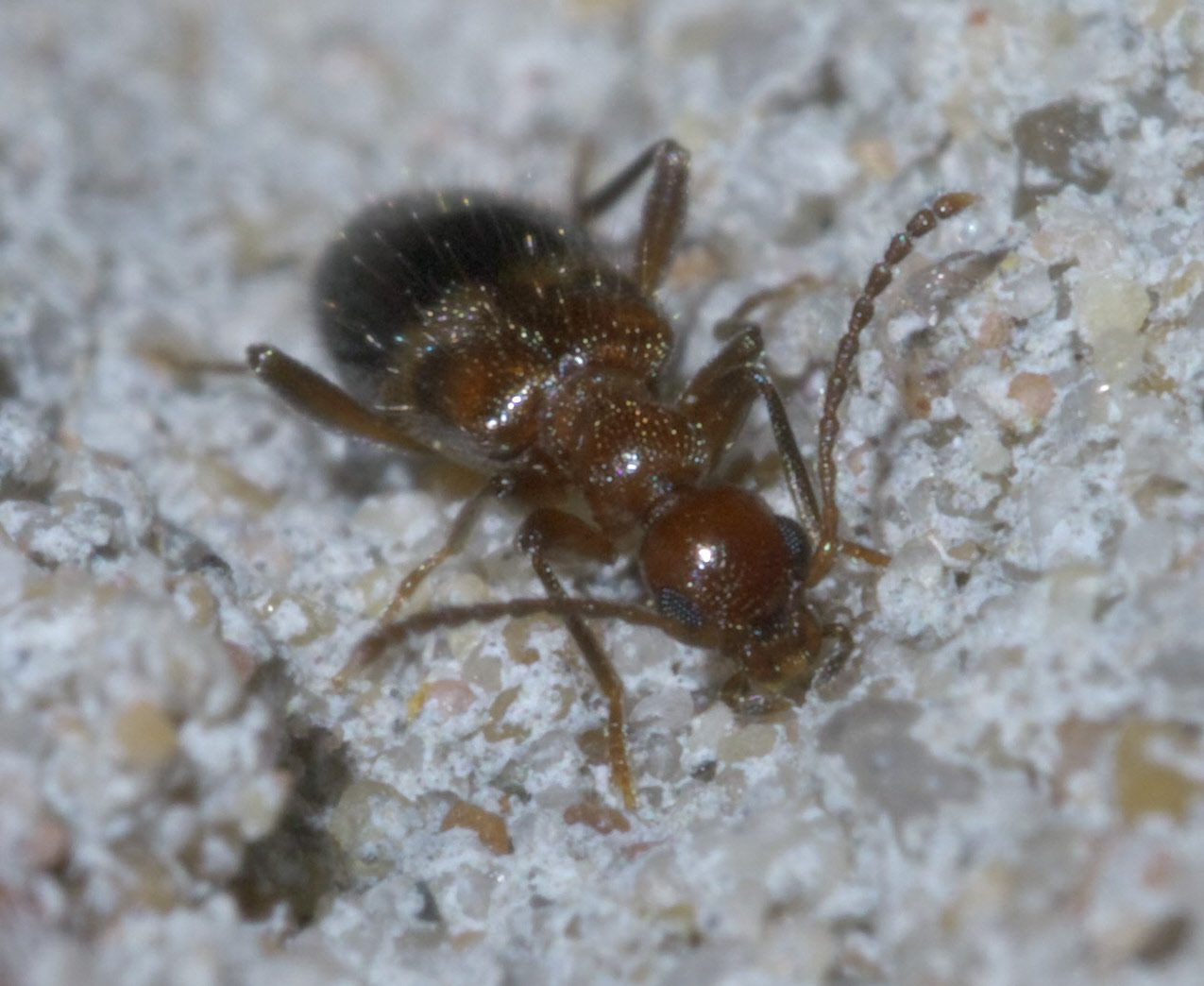
Malporus cinctus

== Species ==
These four species belong to the genus Malporus:

- Malporus cinctus (Say, 1824)
- Malporus formicarius (LaFerté-Sénectère, 1849)
- Malporus properus Casey, 1895
- Malporus werneri Chandler, 1997
