= Vacusus nigritulus =

Scientific classification
- Domain: Eukaryota
- Kingdom: Animalia
- Phylum: Arthropoda
- Class: Insecta
- Order: Coleoptera
- Suborder: Polyphaga
- Infraorder: Cucujiformia
- Family: Anthicidae
- Genus: Vacusus
- Species: V. nigritulus

Binomial name
- Vacusus nigritulus (LeConte, 1851)

Synonyms
- Vacusus arcanus Casey, 1895

Species of beetle

Vacusus nigritulus is a species of antlike flower beetle in the family Anthicidae. It is found in North America.
