= Malporus formicarius =

Scientific classification
- Kingdom: Animalia
- Phylum: Arthropoda
- Class: Insecta
- Order: Coleoptera
- Suborder: Polyphaga
- Infraorder: Cucujiformia
- Family: Anthicidae
- Genus: Malporus
- Species: M. formicarius

Binomial name
- Malporus formicarius (LaFerté-Sénectère, 1849)

Species of beetle

Malporus formicarius is a species of antlike flower beetle in the family Anthicidae. It is found in North America.
