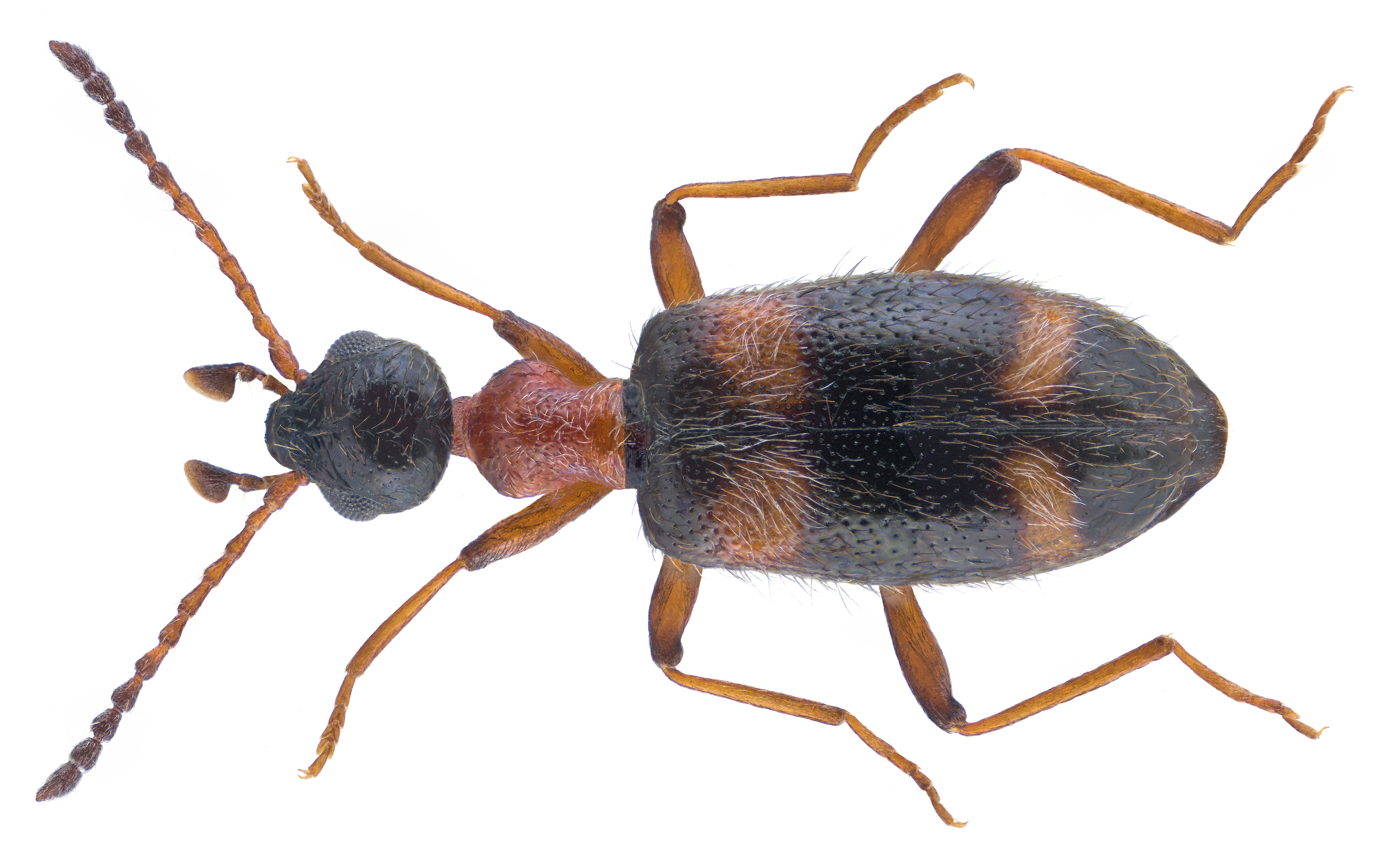
- Stricticollis rufithorax

Scientific classification
- Kingdom: Animalia
- Phylum: Arthropoda
- Clade: Pancrustacea
- Class: Insecta
- Order: Coleoptera
- Suborder: Polyphaga
- Infraorder: Cucujiformia
- Family: Anthicidae
- Subfamily: Anthicinae
- Genus: Stricticollis; Marseul, 1879

= Stricticollis =

Genus of beetles

Stricticollis is a genus of antlike flower beetles in the family Anthicidae. There are at least three described species in Stricticollis.

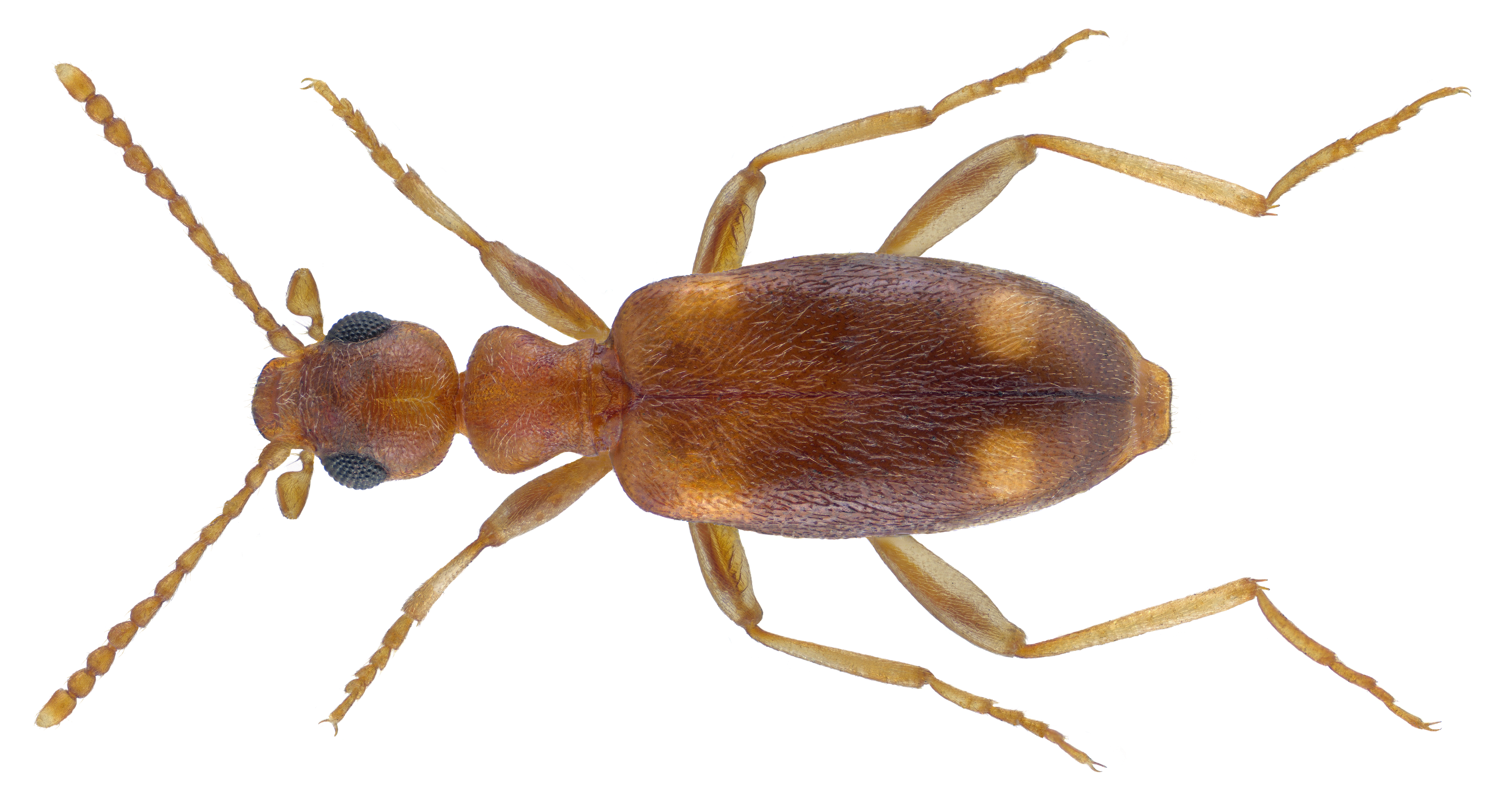

== Species ==
These three species belong to the genus Stricticollis:

- Stricticollis longicollis (W.L.E.Schmidt, 1842)^{g}
- Stricticollis tobias De Marseul, 1879^{g b}
- Stricticollis transversalis (A.Villa & J.B.Villa, 1833)^{g}

Data sources: i = ITIS, c = Catalogue of Life, g = GBIF, b = Bugguide.net
