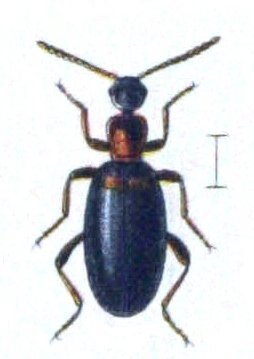
- Anthelephila pedestris

Scientific classification
- Kingdom: Animalia
- Phylum: Arthropoda
- Clade: Pancrustacea
- Class: Insecta
- Order: Coleoptera
- Suborder: Polyphaga
- Infraorder: Cucujiformia
- Family: Anthicidae
- Genus: Anthelephila; Hope, 1833

Synonyms
- Formicomus LaFerté-Sénectère, 1849; Formicosoma Motschoulsky, 1845

= Anthelephila =

Genus of beetles

Anthelephila is a genus of beetles belonging to the family Anthicidae.

The species of this genus are found in Old World and Australia.

Species:

- Anthelephila abnormis Kejval, 2017
- Anthelephila ailani Kejval, 2017
- Anthelephila akela Kejval, 2017
- Anthelephila alamea Kejval, 2017
- Anthelephila angustata Bonadona, 1964
- Anthelephila arcana Kejval, 2017
- Anthelephila ayutthaya Kejval, 2017
- Anthelephila baeri (Pic, 1903)
- Anthelephila banhuaipo Kejval, 2017
- Anthelephila bannape Kejval, 2017
- Anthelephila bifida Kejval, 2017
- Anthelephila bimaculatipennis Pic, 1939
- Anthelephila bolavensis Kejval, 2017
- Anthelephila bramina (LaFerté-Séneetère, 1849)
- Anthelephila caeruleipennis (La Ferte-Senectere, 1847)
- Anthelephila canaliculata (La Ferte-Senectere, 1849)
- Anthelephila davita Kejval, 2017
- Anthelephila disparilis Kejval, 2017
- Anthelephila falcata Kejval, 2017
- Anthelephila fallax Kejval, 2017
- Anthelephila feminea Kejval, Mz & Ch-, 2018
- Anthelephila fossicollis Kejval, 2002
- Anthelephila fuscipes (Krekich-Strassoldo, 1931)
- Anthelephila hauseri (Pic, 1897)
- Anthelephila hispanica (Motschulsky, 1849)
- Anthelephila imperator LaFerté-Sénectère, 1849
- Anthelephila imperatrix LaFerté-Séneetère, 1849
- Anthelephila insolita Kejval, 2017
- Anthelephila ionica (La Ferte-Senectere, 1849)
- Anthelephila jelineki Kejval, 2000
- Anthelephila keahi Kejval, 2017
- Anthelephila keilana Kejval, 2017
- Anthelephila klapperichi (Uhmann, 1988)
- Anthelephila kubani Kejval, 2017
- Anthelephila laopako Kejval, 2017
- Anthelephila latro (La Ferte-Senectere, 1849)
- Anthelephila lewisi (Marseul, 1876)
- Anthelephila maindroni Pic, 1903
- Anthelephila multiformis Kejval, 2002
- Anthelephila nadari Pic, 1893
- Anthelephila nandi Kejval, Mz & Ch-, 2018
- Anthelephila nemrod LaFerte-Senectere, 1849
- Anthelephila ninus (La Ferte-Senectere, 1849)
- Anthelephila panayensis Telnov, 2018
- Anthelephila parallela Marseul, 1879
- Anthelephila paucula Kejval, 2017
- Anthelephila pedestris (Rossi, 1790)
- Anthelephila persica Kejval, 2000
- Anthelephila provecta Kejval, 2017
- Anthelephila sahyadrica Kejval, Mz & Ch-, 2018
- Anthelephila sauteri (Pic, 1912)
- Anthelephila semistrigosa Kejval, Mz & Ch-, 2018
- Anthelephila simoni Pic, 1893
- Anthelephila soror Kejval, 2002
- Anthelephila strigosa Heberdey, 1934
- Anthelephila theravada Kejval, 2017
- Anthelephila triplex Kejval, 2017
- Anthelephila wanika Kejval, 2017
- Formicomus flavicornis Motschulsky, 1863
