= Leptanthicus =

Scientific classification
- Kingdom: Animalia
- Phylum: Arthropoda
- Clade: Pancrustacea
- Class: Insecta
- Order: Coleoptera
- Suborder: Polyphaga
- Infraorder: Cucujiformia
- Family: Anthicidae
- Genus: Leptanthicus; Werner, 1958
- Species: L. staphyliniformis

Binomial name
- Leptanthicus staphyliniformis Werner, 1958

Genus of beetles

Leptanthicus is a genus of antlike flower beetles in the family Anthicidae. There is one described species in Leptanthicus, L. staphyliniformis.
