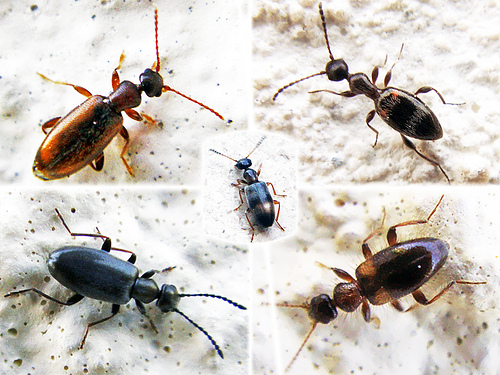
- Cordicollis instabilis (up-left) Anthelephila pedestris (up-right) unidentified (center) Microhoria volxemi (bottom-left) Hirticomus hispidus (bottom right)

Scientific classification
- Kingdom: Animalia
- Phylum: Arthropoda
- Clade: Pancrustacea
- Class: Insecta
- Order: Coleoptera
- Suborder: Polyphaga
- Infraorder: Cucujiformia
- Family: Anthicidae
- Genus: Cordicollis; Marseul, 1879

Synonyms
- Cordicomus Pic, 1894

= Cordicollis =

Genus of beetles

Cordicollis is a genus of beetles belonging to the family Anthicidae.

The species of this genus are found in Europe, Southern Asia and Madagascar.

Species:

- Cordicollis gracilior (Abeille de Perrin, 1885)
- Cordicollis gracilis (Panzer, 1796)
