= Mecynotarsus =

Scientific classification
- Kingdom: Animalia
- Phylum: Arthropoda
- Clade: Pancrustacea
- Class: Insecta
- Order: Coleoptera
- Suborder: Polyphaga
- Infraorder: Cucujiformia
- Family: Anthicidae
- Genus: Mecynotarsus; LaFerté-Sénectère, 1847

Genus of beetles

Mecynotarsus is a genus of monoceros beetles in the family Anthicidae. There are about 19 described species in Mecynotarsus.

== Species ==
These 19 species belong to the genus Mecynotarsus:

- Mecynotarsus abductus
- Mecynotarsus alvarado Chandler
- Mecynotarsus antennalis Hashimoto & Sakai, 2011
- Mecynotarsus bison (Olivier, 1811)
- Mecynotarsus candidus LeConte, 1875
- Mecynotarsus delicatulus Horn, 1868
- Mecynotarsus doberai Telnov, 2016
- Mecynotarsus falcatus Chandler
- Mecynotarsus fasciatus Motschulsky, 1863
- Mecynotarsus faustii Seidlitz, 1891
- Mecynotarsus flavipes Pic, 1913
- Mecynotarsus intermixtus Werner
- Mecynotarsus jamaicanus Werner
- Mecynotarsus nevermanni Werner
- Mecynotarsus quadrimaculatus Pic, 1913
- Mecynotarsus salvadorensis Werner
- Mecynotarsus semicinctus Wollaston, 1865
- Mecynotarsus serricornis (Panzer, 1796)
- Mecynotarsus truquii De Marseul, 1879
