= Squamanotoxus =

Scientific classification
- Domain: Eukaryota
- Kingdom: Animalia
- Phylum: Arthropoda
- Class: Insecta
- Order: Coleoptera
- Suborder: Polyphaga
- Infraorder: Cucujiformia
- Family: Anthicidae
- Genus: Squamanotoxus; Chandler, 2001

Genus of beetles

Squamanotoxus is a genus of monoceros beetles in the family Anthicidae. There are at least three described species in Squamanotoxus.

== Species ==
These three species belong to the genus Squamanotoxus:

- Squamanotoxus balsasensis (Werner, 1962)
- Squamanotoxus elegans (LeConte, 1875)
- Squamanotoxus vafer (Chandler, 1977)
