= Euvacusus =

Scientific classification
- Kingdom: Animalia
- Phylum: Arthropoda
- Clade: Pancrustacea
- Class: Insecta
- Order: Coleoptera
- Suborder: Polyphaga
- Infraorder: Cucujiformia
- Family: Anthicidae
- Genus: Euvacusus; Casey, 1904
- Species: E. coloradanus

Binomial name
- Euvacusus coloradanus Casey, 1904

Genus of insects

Euvacusus is a genus of antlike flower beetles belonging to the Anthicidae family. There is one described species in Euvacusus, E. coloradanus.
