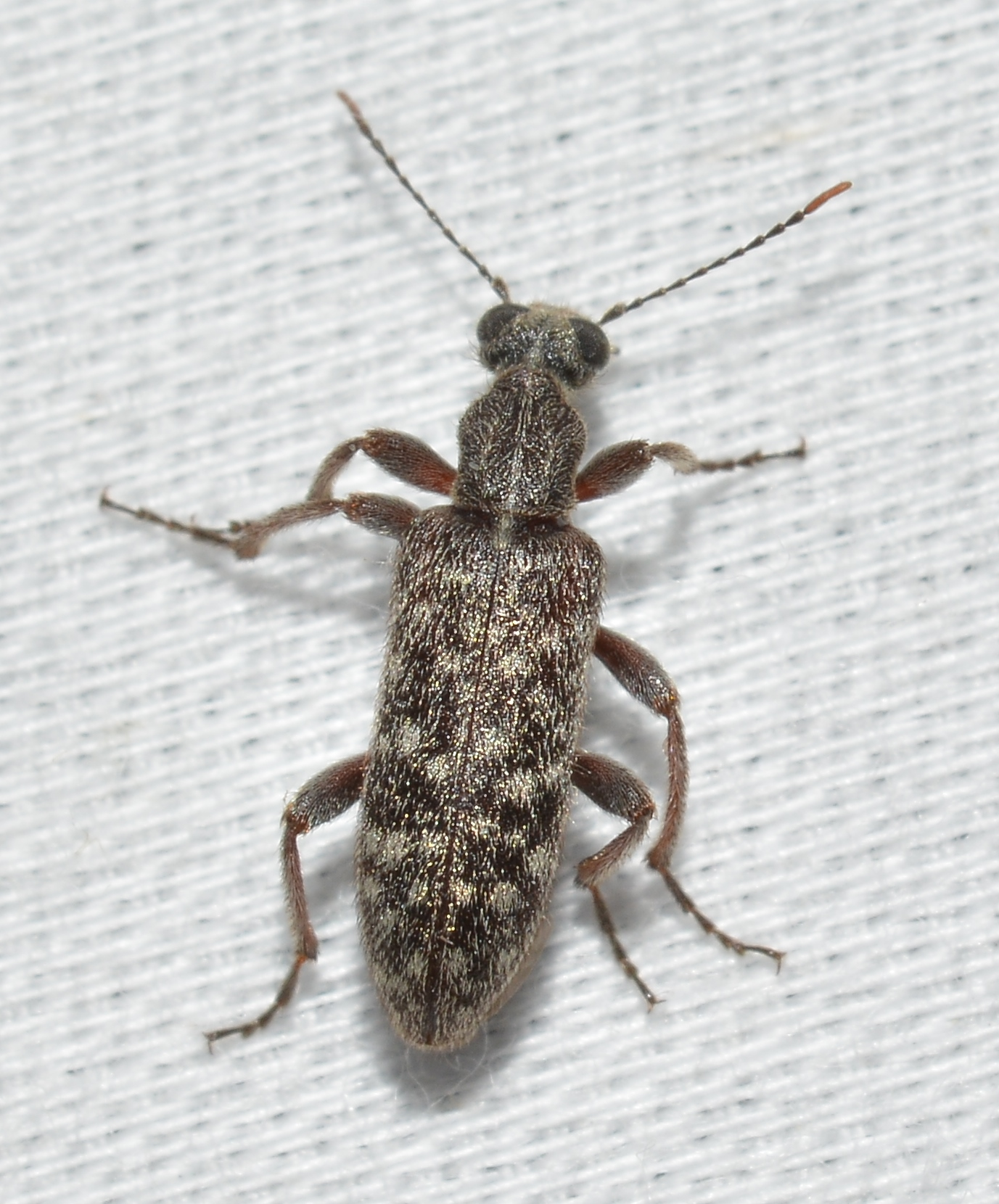
- Anthicidae, Eurygeniinae

Scientific classification
- Kingdom: Animalia
- Phylum: Arthropoda
- Class: Insecta
- Order: Coleoptera
- Suborder: Polyphaga
- Infraorder: Cucujiformia
- Family: Anthicidae
- Subfamily: Eurygeniinae; LeConte, 1862

Tribes
- Eurygeniini LeConte, 1862; Ictistygnini Borchmann, 1936; Mitraelabrini Abdullah, 1969

= Eurygeniinae =

Subfamily of beetles

Eurygeniinae is a subfamily of antlike flower beetles in the family Anthicidae. There are about 12 genera and more than 50 described species in Eurygeniinae.

== Genera ==
These 12 genera belong to the subfamily Eurygeniinae:

- Bactrocerus LeConte, 1866
- Duboisius Abdullah, 1961
- Eurygenius LaFerté-Sénectère, 1849
- Leptoremus Casey, 1904
- Mastoremus Casey, 1895
- Neoeurygenius Abdullah, 1963
- Pergetus Casey, 1895
- Qadrius Abdullah, 1964
- Retocomus Casey, 1895
- Rilettius Abdullah, 1964
- Stereopalpus LaFerté-Sénectère, 1846
- Thambopasta Werner, 1974
