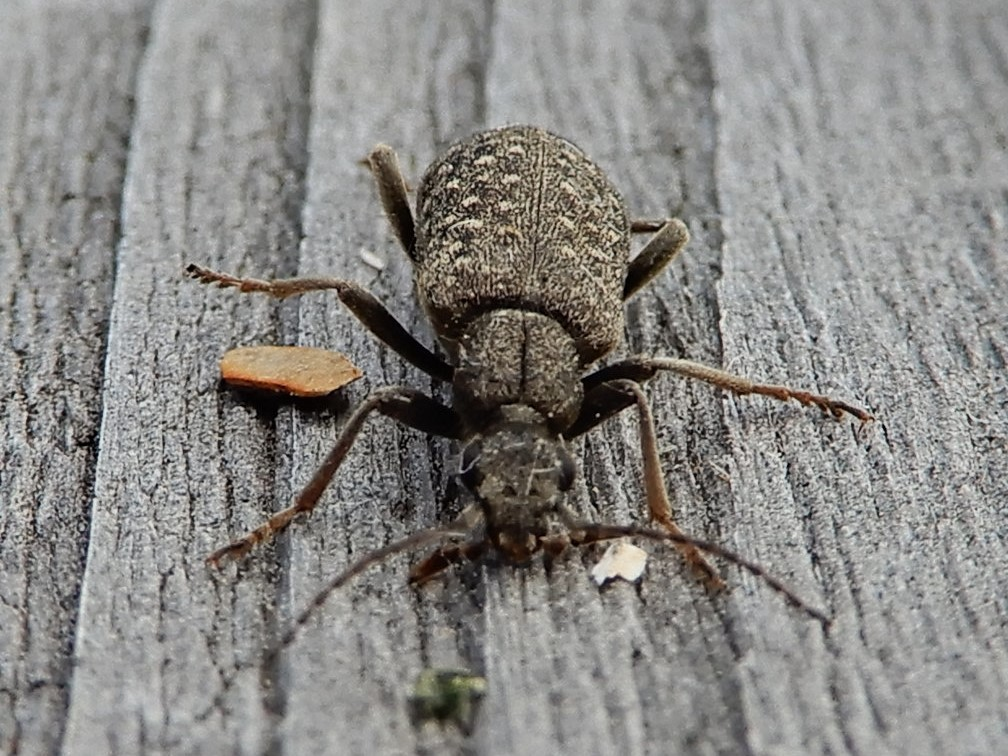

Scientific classification
- Kingdom: Animalia
- Phylum: Arthropoda
- Class: Insecta
- Order: Coleoptera
- Suborder: Polyphaga
- Infraorder: Cucujiformia
- Family: Anthicidae
- Genus: Pergetus
- Species: P. campanulatus

Binomial name
- Pergetus campanulatus (LeConte, 1874)

= Pergetus campanulatus =

Species of beetle

Pergetus campanulatus is a species of antlike flower beetle in the family Anthicidae. It is found in North America.
