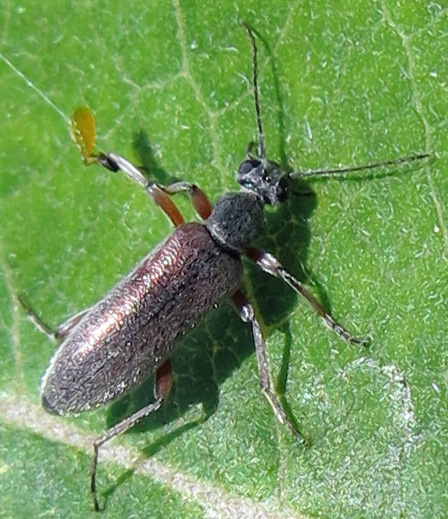

Scientific classification
- Domain: Eukaryota
- Kingdom: Animalia
- Phylum: Arthropoda
- Class: Insecta
- Order: Coleoptera
- Suborder: Polyphaga
- Infraorder: Cucujiformia
- Family: Anthicidae
- Genus: Stereopalpus
- Species: S. vestitus

Binomial name
- Stereopalpus vestitus (Say, 1824)

Synonyms
- Stereopalpus badiipennis LeConte, 1855

= Stereopalpus vestitus =

Species of beetle

Stereopalpus vestitus is a species of antlike flower beetle in the family Anthicidae. It is found in North America.
