= Retocomus wildii =

Scientific classification
- Domain: Eukaryota
- Kingdom: Animalia
- Phylum: Arthropoda
- Class: Insecta
- Order: Coleoptera
- Suborder: Polyphaga
- Infraorder: Cucujiformia
- Family: Anthicidae
- Genus: Retocomus
- Species: R. wildii

Binomial name
- Retocomus wildii (LeConte, 1855)

Species of beetle

Retocomus wildii is a species of antlike flower beetle in the family Anthicidae. It is found in North America.
