= Duboisius arizonensis =

Scientific classification
- Domain: Eukaryota
- Kingdom: Animalia
- Phylum: Arthropoda
- Class: Insecta
- Order: Coleoptera
- Suborder: Polyphaga
- Infraorder: Cucujiformia
- Family: Anthicidae
- Genus: Duboisius
- Species: D. arizonensis

Binomial name
- Duboisius arizonensis (Champion, 1916)

Synonyms
- Duboisius distinguedens Abdullah, 1961; Duboisius howdeni Abdullah, 1961; Duboisius terminalis Abdullah, 1961

Species of beetle

Duboisius arizonensis is a species of antlike flower beetle in the family Anthicidae. It is found in Central America and North America.
