= Stereopalpus mellyi =

Scientific classification
- Kingdom: Animalia
- Phylum: Arthropoda
- Class: Insecta
- Order: Coleoptera
- Suborder: Polyphaga
- Infraorder: Cucujiformia
- Family: Anthicidae
- Genus: Stereopalpus
- Species: S. mellyi

Binomial name
- Stereopalpus mellyi LaFerté-Sénectère, 1846

Species of beetle

Stereopalpus mellyi is a species of antlike flower beetle in the family Anthicidae. It is found in North America.
