= Duboisius =

Scientific classification
- Kingdom: Animalia
- Phylum: Arthropoda
- Clade: Pancrustacea
- Class: Insecta
- Order: Coleoptera
- Suborder: Polyphaga
- Infraorder: Cucujiformia
- Family: Anthicidae
- Subfamily: Eurygeniinae
- Genus: Duboisius; Abdullah, 1961

Genus of beetles

Duboisius is a genus of antlike flower beetles in the family Anthicidae. There are about five described species in Duboisius.

== Species ==
These five species belong to the genus Duboisius:

- Duboisius arizonensis (Champion, 1916)
- Duboisius barri Abdullah, 1964
- Duboisius brevicornis Abdullah, 1964
- Duboisius texanus Abdullah, 1961
- Duboisius wickenburgiensis Abdullah, 1961
