= Retocomus =

Scientific classification
- Kingdom: Animalia
- Phylum: Arthropoda
- Clade: Pancrustacea
- Class: Insecta
- Order: Coleoptera
- Suborder: Polyphaga
- Infraorder: Cucujiformia
- Family: Anthicidae
- Subfamily: Eurygeniinae
- Genus: Retocomus; Casey, 1895

Genus of beetles

Retocomus is a genus of antlike flower beetles in the family Anthicidae. There are about 17 described species in Retocomus.

== Species ==
These 17 species belong to the genus Retocomus:

- Retocomus alami Abdullah, 1965
- Retocomus basiri Abdullah, 1965
- Retocomus brittoni Abdullah, 1965
- Retocomus colasi Abdullah, 1965
- Retocomus constrictus (LeConte, 1852)
- Retocomus crichtoni Abdullah, 1965
- Retocomus crowsoni Abdullah, 1965
- Retocomus duboisi Abdullah, 1965
- Retocomus gratus Casey, 1895
- Retocomus kaszabi Abdullah, 1965
- Retocomus lindrothi Abdullah, 1965
- Retocomus mockfordi Abdullah, 1965
- Retocomus murinus (Haldeman, 1843)
- Retocomus qadrii Abdullah, 1965
- Retocomus rehni Abdullah, 1965
- Retocomus riletti Abdullah, 1965
- Retocomus wildii (LeConte, 1855)
