= Retocomus murinus =

Scientific classification
- Domain: Eukaryota
- Kingdom: Animalia
- Phylum: Arthropoda
- Class: Insecta
- Order: Coleoptera
- Suborder: Polyphaga
- Infraorder: Cucujiformia
- Family: Anthicidae
- Genus: Retocomus
- Species: R. murinus

Binomial name
- Retocomus murinus (Haldeman, 1843)

Species of beetle

Retocomus murinus is a species of antlike flower beetle in the family Anthicidae. It is found in North America.
