= Stereopalpus =

Scientific classification
- Kingdom: Animalia
- Phylum: Arthropoda
- Class: Insecta
- Order: Coleoptera
- Suborder: Polyphaga
- Infraorder: Cucujiformia
- Family: Anthicidae
- Subfamily: Eurygeniinae
- Genus: Stereopalpus; LaFerté-Sénectère, 1846

Genus of beetles

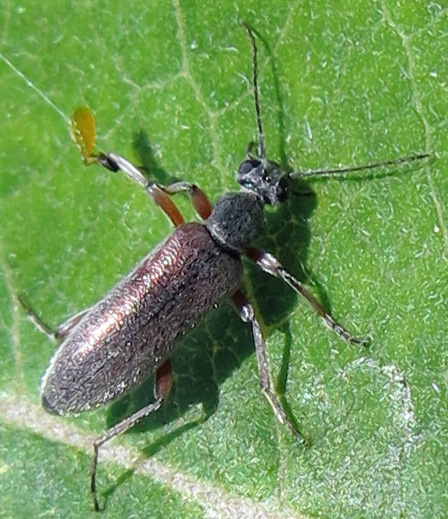
Image of Stereopalpus Vestitus

Stereopalpus is a genus of antlike flower beetles in the family Anthicidae. There are about 11 described species in Stereopalpus.

== Species ==
These 11 species belong to the genus Stereopalpus:

- Stereopalpus bifidus Abdullah, 1965
- Stereopalpus californicus Abdullah, 1965
- Stereopalpus carolinensis Abdullah, 1965
- Stereopalpus columbianus Hopping, 1925
- Stereopalpus guttatus LeConte, 1855
- Stereopalpus hirtus Hatch, 1965
- Stereopalpus mellyi LaFerté-Sénectère, 1846
- Stereopalpus nimius Casey, 1895
- Stereopalpus pruinosus LeConte, 1874
- Stereopalpus rufipes Casey, 1895
- Stereopalpus vestitus (Say, 1824)
