= Pergetus =

Scientific classification
- Kingdom: Animalia
- Phylum: Arthropoda
- Clade: Pancrustacea
- Class: Insecta
- Order: Coleoptera
- Suborder: Polyphaga
- Infraorder: Cucujiformia
- Family: Anthicidae
- Subfamily: Eurygeniinae
- Genus: Pergetus; Casey, 1895

Genus of beetles

Pergetus is a genus of antlike flower beetles in the family Anthicidae. There are at least two described species in Pergetus.

== Species ==
These two species belong to the genus Pergetus:

- Pergetus campanulatus (LeConte, 1874)
- Pergetus wilati (Lacordaire, 1859)
