= Leptoremus =

Scientific classification
- Kingdom: Animalia
- Phylum: Arthropoda
- Clade: Pancrustacea
- Class: Insecta
- Order: Coleoptera
- Suborder: Polyphaga
- Infraorder: Cucujiformia
- Family: Anthicidae
- Genus: Leptoremus; Casey, 1904
- Species: L. argenteus

Binomial name
- Leptoremus argenteus Casey, 1904

Genus of beetles

Leptoremus is a genus of antlike flower beetles in the family Anthicidae. There is one described species in Leptoremus, L. argenteus.
