= Hispanics and Latinos in Colorado =

Hispanic and Latino Coloradans are residents of the state of Colorado who are of Hispanic or Latino ancestry. As of 2020, Hispanics and Latinos of any race made up 21% of the state's population, or 1,269,520 of the state's 5,770,545 residents.

== History ==
1598- During Juan de Oñate's expedition from Mexico, following the Rio Grande del Norte north, he claimed all of the river's drainage for Spain.

1694- The New Mexico governor Diego de Vargas traveled to present-day Colorado, following the Rio Grande to a tributary, Culebra Creek. He recorded several toponyms, including Colorado River.

1706- Juan de Ulibarri claimed the west of present-day Colorado for Spain. Western Colorado was incorporated into Santa Fe de Nuevo México. In 1762, after the Seven Years' War, France ceded western Louisiana to Spain, including eastern Colorado.

1776- The Domínguez-Escalante expedition took place in northern New Spain. Led by friars Silvestre Velez de Escalante and Francisco Atanacio Dominguez, the expedition team sought a route linking Santa Fe to Monterey. They travelled through northern New Mexico, Colorado and Utah.

1787- Juan Bautista de Anza established the settlement of San Carlos near present-day Pueblo, Colorado, but it quickly failed.

1800- Spain returns Louisiana to France in 1800, including eastern Colorado. France later cedes Louisiana to the US in 1803.

1821- Mexico wins independence from Spain. Mexico grows concerned about protecting its northernmost territory from North Americans and US citizens. To reinforce Mexican claims of what is now part of Colorado, Gov. Manuel Armijo creates land grants to attract settlers.

1833- A group of 80 families from Abiquiu and Taos migrated to modern-day Colorado. They settled in Conejos County, but the Navajos attacked them and the settlers lost their goods, so they returned to their homeland.

1840's- The Utes prevent the settlement of Nuevomexicanos. The Maxwell Land Grant is acquired, extending from the Sangre de Cristo Range to as far south as Taos, New Mexico, including modern day Las Animas County.

1848- Northwest Mexico was incorporated into the US, including western Colorado.

1851- A small group of Nuevomexicanos from Taos migrated to the San Luis Valley. They founded the first Hispanic permanent settlement and initiated Hispanic migration to Colorado. This first group was followed by another 50 Nuevomexicano families from Abiquiu and El Llanito, which settled in Guadalupe three years later. San Luis is the oldest permanent town in Colorado.

1854- Town of Guadalupe, Colorado is established, later absorbed by the town of Conejos, in a higher, less flood-prone area.

1860's- Hispanic pastoralists migrate to Colorado from Latin America when the country demanded wool uniforms for its soldiers during the American Civil War, while many other Nuevomexicanos migrated to counties such as Las Animas or Huerfano.

1870's- Over 5,000 people of that origin lived in these counties, making up more than 90% of the population in both regions. From then on, many other Hispanics migrated to Colorado.

1880's- Mexican migration even gave rise to a Hispanic neighborhood in the modern-day "America the Beautiful Park" in Colorado Springs, which included a school, a church and several businesses. This was abandoned in the early 20th century.

1890's- US Congress authorized settlement of land grant claims. The court throws out the Conejos Grant and upholds a reduction of the Vigil and St. Vrain grants from four million acres (16,000 km^{2}) to 97,390.95 acres (39,412.72 ha).

1940's- Following World War I and World War II, Hispanic servicemen move families from rural agricultural areas to urban areas such as Denver and Ft. Collins.

1950's- Hispanics are distributed in various regions of Colorado (San Acacio, Saguache, Guadalupe, etc.).

1960's- Chicano rights organizations are founded in Colorado. Corky Gonzales and Richard Castro bring new contemporary Hispanic history to Colorado. The growth in popularity leads to the elections of Federico Peña, Ken Salazar, and John Salazar.

1990 to Present - The Hispanic population grows significantly, consisting of mostly Mexicans, seeking better social and economic conditions.

2010- US Census confirms Hispanics are the fastest growing and largest ethnic group in Colorado. Approximately one in five Coloradans is Hispanic and one in three from Denver is Hispanic.

== Demographics ==
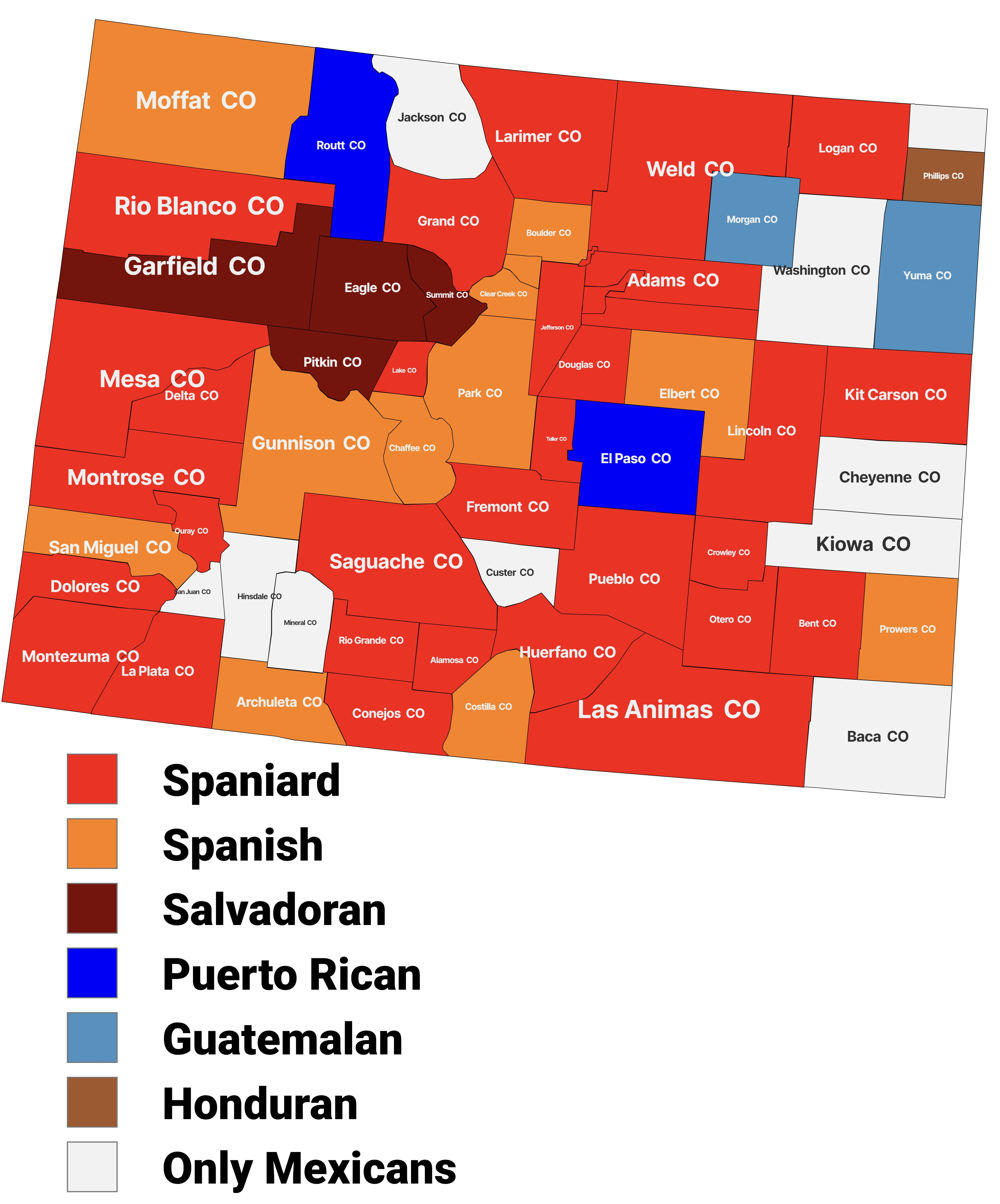
Largest Hispanic ethnic origin besides Mexican in Colorado by county, per the 2020 census

According to the Latino Leadership Institute website, Hispanics number more than 100,000 people in Adams, Arapahoe, Denver and El Paso. They represented over 33% in Adams, Alamosa, Conejos, Costilla, Huerfano, Las Animas, Morgan, Otero, Prowers, Pueblo, Rio Grande and Saguache counties.The majority of Hispanics in the state are under the age of 18 (35% of Hispanics), while the rest of the Hispanic population is mainly made up of the 18-34 and 35-54 age groups (28% and 25% respectively).

(self-identified ethnicity, not by birthplace)
Ancestry by origin (2019 surveys)	Population	%
Argentine	4,448	
Bolivian	1,521	
Chilean	2,890	
Colombian	8,149	
Costa Rican	4,118	
Cuban	12,823	
Dominican	4,920	
Ecuadorian	1,922	
Guatemalan	11,901	
Honduran	5,616	
Mexican	920,228	
Nicaraguan	2,035	
Panamanian	3,026	
Paraguayan	204	
Peruvian	8,824	
Puerto Rican	42,525	
Salvadoran	24,375	
"Spanish"	54,922	
"Spaniard"	50,819	
"Spanish American"	3,161	
Uruguayan	183	
Venezuelan	4,710	
All other	83,342	
Total	1,256,903	

Hispanic or Latino Origin	2010 Census	2010 percentage	2020 Census	2020 Percentage
Mexicans	757,181	15.1%	903,912	15.6%
Central Americans	29,386	0.6%	63,834	1.1%
South Americans	19,117	0.4%	46,735	0.8%
Other Hispanic	202,011	4.0%	223,743	3.8%
Total	1,007,695	20%	1,293,214	22.3%

=== Cities and town where the Hispanics are majority (2010 census) ===
==== Places with between 10,000 and 25,000 people ====
- Berkley (55.7%)
- Sherrelwood (58.9%)
- Welby (54.7%)

==== Places with fewer than 10,000 people ====
- Alamosa (53.2%)
- Alamosa East (54.1%)
- Antonito (85.1%)
- Avondale (59.8%)
- Blanca (60.8%)
- Cattle Creek (65.4%)
- Capulin (83.0%)
- Center (87.4%)
- Conejos (82.8%)
- Crowley (54.0%)
- Del Norte (56.3%)
- Derby (64.2%)
- Dotsero (81.4%)
- Fort Garland (85.0%)
- Fort Lupton (55.0%)
- Garden City (66.2%)
- Gilcrest (55.5%)
- Granada (70.6%)
- Jansen (58.0%)
- La Jara (62.3%)
- Log Lane Village (50.1%)
- Lynn (66.7%)
- Monte Vista (61.3%)
- Olathe (50.0%)
- Rocky Ford (59.1%)
- Romeo (79.5%)
- Salt Creek (86.0%)
- San Acacio (62.5%)
- San Luis (84.3%)
- Starkville (72.9%)
- Trinidad (50.0%)
- Twin Lakes (Adams County) (60.7%)
- Walsenburg (56.0%)
- Weston (72.7%)
- Valdez, Colorado (61.7%)

== Historic Hispanic/Latino population ==
Colorado	Number of people of Mexican Origin (1880-1930) and of Hispanic/Latino Origin (1940-2020) in Colorado^{[a]}	+% of Population of Mexican Origin (1880-1930) and of Hispanic/Latino Origin (1940-2020) in Colorado
1860	+ 2,000 (immigrants)	
1870	11,959	30%
1880	13,311	
1890	N/A	
1900	19,273	
1910	3,196 - 23,991	0.4% (percentage of first data)
1920	15,034 - 38,665	1.6% (percentage of first data)
1930	59,040 - 80,355	5.7% (percentage of first data)
1940	92,549	8.2
1950	119,258	9.0%
1960	157,855	9.0%
1970	255, 994 (15% sample)	11.6
1980	339,717	11.8
1990	424,302	12.9
2000	735,801	17.1%
2010	1,038,687	20.7%
2020	1,263,390	21.9%

== Notable residents ==
- José Ramón Aguilar (1852-1929), pioneer rancher. Aguilar, CO is named for him.
- Antonio D. Archuleta, state senator. In 1883 he introduced the bill to create Archuleta County from the western portion of Conejos County.
- Felipe Baca (1828–1874), pioneer rancher. Helped found Trinidad, CO. Baca County is named for him.
- Polly Baca (born 1941), first Hispanic woman elected to the Colorado State Senate.
- Casimiro Barela (1847–1920), helped write Colorado's State Constitution.
- Rodolfo "Corky" Gonzales (1928-2005), community Activist.
- Miguel Antonio Otero (1829-1882), pioneer merchant. Otero County is named for him.
- Federico Peña (born March 15, 1947), first Hispanic mayor of Denver, CO.
- Eve Torres (born 1984), actress, dancer, model, martial arts instructor, retired professional wrestler. Grew up in Denver.

== See also ==
- Hispanic and Latino Americans
- Neomexicano
