= Los Caminos Antiguos Scenic and Historic Byway =

Colorado Scenic and Historic Byway

Coordinates: 37.4677°N 105.8743°W

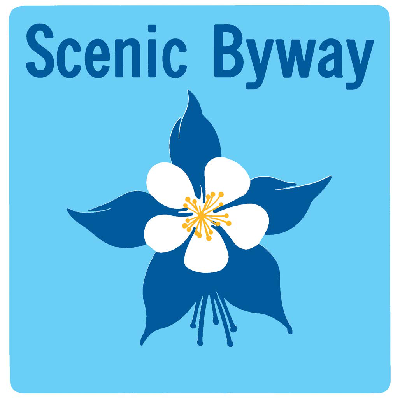
Los Caminos Antiguos Scenic and Historic Byway

Route information
- Maintained by CDOT
- Length: 129 mi (208 km)
- Existed: 2000–present

Major junctions
- North end: US 160 / SH 17 Alamosa
- South end: SH 17 Cumbres Pass

Location
- Country: United States
- State: Colorado
- Counties: Alamosa, Conejos, and Costilla counties

Highway system
- Scenic Byways; National; National Forest; BLM; NPS; Colorado State Highway System; Interstate; US; State; Scenic

The Los Caminos Antiguos Scenic and Historic Byway is a 129-mile (208 km) Back Country Byway and Colorado Scenic and Historic Byway located in Alamosa, Conejos, and Costilla counties, Colorado, USA. The byway explores the historic San Luis Valley of south-central Colorado including Great Sand Dunes National Park and Preserve; the Old Spanish National Historic Trail; historic Fort Garland, San Luis (San Luis de la Culebra), the oldest town in Colorado; and the Cumbres and Toltec Scenic Railroad.

== Route ==
The route begins in Alamosa East by heading north on the northern portion of Colorado State Highway 17. At the town of Mosca, the byway heads east along Alamosa County Road 6N to the entrance of Great Sand Dunes National Park and Preserve. From the park, the byway heads south along Colorado State Highway 150 to its terminus at U.S. Highway 160. From this intersection, it heads east along Highway 160 to the town of Fort Garland. From Fort Garland, the route goes south along Colorado State Highway 159 to the town of San Luis. From San Luis, the byway goes west along Colorado State Highway 142 all the way to the town of Romeo. From Romeo, it heads south on Highway 285 to the town of Antonito. From Antonito, it heads west along the southern part of Colorado State Highway 17 until it reaches the New Mexico border.

== See also ==
- History Colorado
- List of scenic byways in Colorado
- Scenic byways in the United States
