= Manassa, Colorado =

Town in Colorado, United States

Town of Manassa, Colorado
- Statutory town
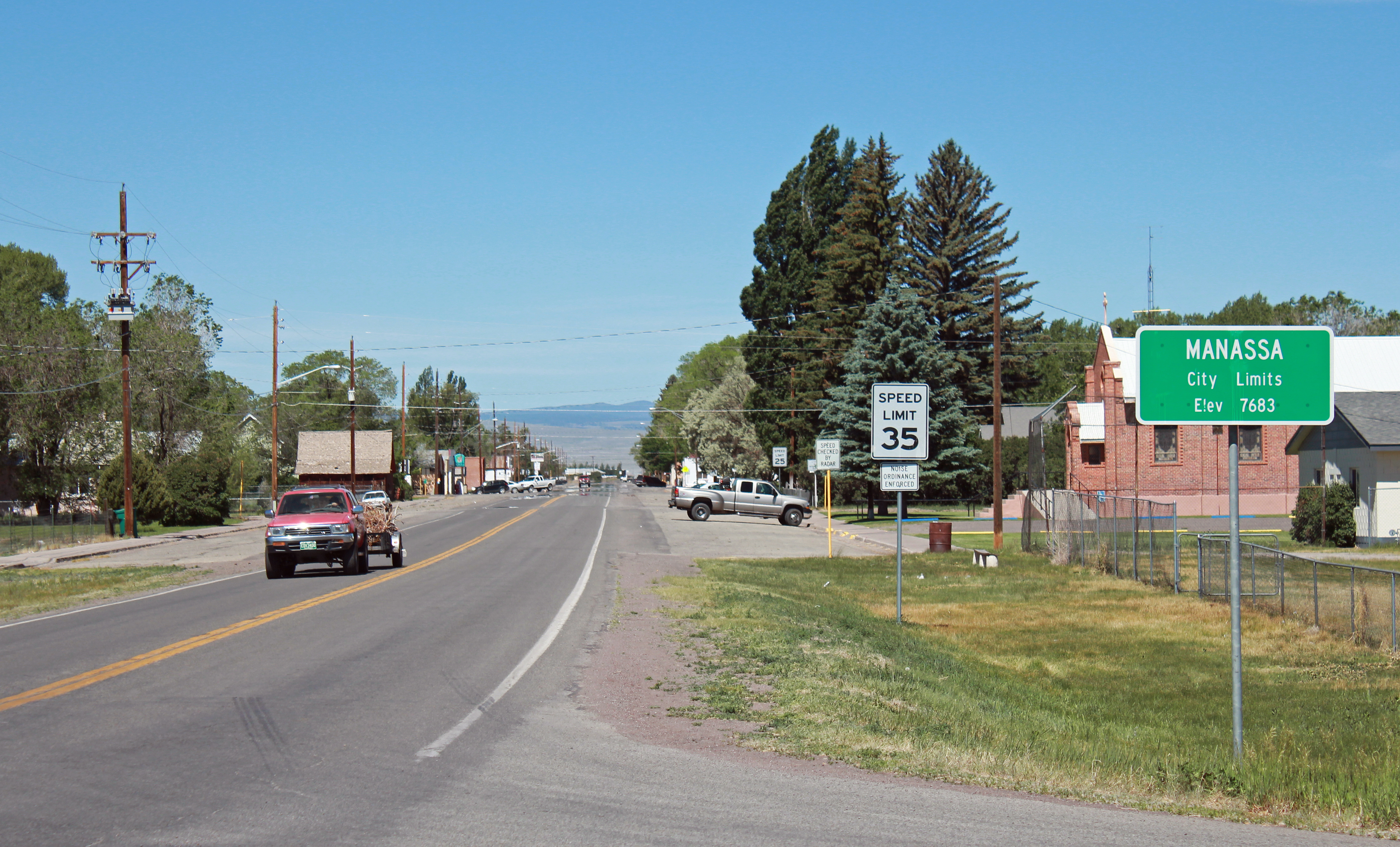
- Main Street in Manassa looking west

- Location of Manassa in Conejos County, Colorado.
- Coordinates: 37°10′26″N 105°56′14″W
- Country: United States
- State: Colorado
- County: Conejos
- Founded: 1851
- Incorporated (town): June 6, 1889

Government
  - Type: Statutory Town

Area
  - Total: 0.93 sq mi (2.41 km^{2})
  - Land: 0.93 sq mi (2.41 km^{2})
  - Water: 0 sq mi (0.00 km^{2})
- Elevation: 7,691 ft (2,344 m)

Population (2020)
  - Total: 947
  - Density: 1,020/sq mi (393/km^{2})
- Time zone: UTC-7 (Mountain (MST))
  - Summer (DST): UTC-6 (MDT)
- ZIP code: 81141 (PO Box)
- Area code: 719
- FIPS code: 08-48060
- GNIS feature ID: 2412937
- Website: townofmanassa.colorado.gov

Manassa is a statutory town and is the most populous municipality in Conejos County, Colorado, United States. Founded in 1851, the town's population was 947 at the 2020 United States census.

== Location ==
Manassa is a farming and ranching community located in eastern Conejos County, Colorado in the sprawling San Luis Valley in South-Central Colorado.

Manassa's elevation is 7,683 feet (2,342 m) above sea level. The land within Manassa city limits is entirely flat, with rolling hills nearby. Foothills and mountains (taller than 14,000 feet (4,300 m)) are farther in each direction, including the Sangre de Cristo Range to the east and the San Juan Mountains to the west.

The most prominent mountain in the area, Blanca Peak, is 37 miles to the northeast and towers over the Great Sand Dunes National Park and Preserve.

The San Luis Valley contains six counties and portions of three others. It is an extensive high-elevation depositional basin of approximately 8,000 square miles (21,000 km^{2}) with an average elevation of 7,664 feet (2,336 m) above sea level. The valley is a section of the Rio Grande Rift and is drained to the south by the Rio Grande, which rises in the San Juan Mountains to the west of the valley and flows south into New Mexico. The San Luis Valley has a cold desert climate but has substantial water resources from the Rio Grande and groundwater.

== History ==
Migration patterns demonstrate how people from northern New Mexico settled the area around Manassa in the mid 19th century. Many early settlers were the descendants of colonists from the Spanish colonial period beginning in 1598 with Juan de Oñate's colonization of New Mexico. Today, approximately half of Manassa's residents are of Spanish and Mexican heritage. Most of the other citizens of Manassa are the descendants of the Mormon pioneers who founded Manassa in 1879, and named the town after Manasseh, a son of the Israelite Joseph. Manassa was located a short distance from two ranches purchased by the Mormons from Hispanos on the south side of the Conejos River, across from Los Cerritos, Colorado.

The selection of the land for the colony was made on the assurance that the railroad would soon be built nearby. However, one year later the railroad bypassed the colony, and instead passed through Romeo, Colorado, just three miles to the west.

== Railroad ==
The selection of the land for the colony was made on the assurance that the railroad would soon be built nearby. However, one year later the railroad bypassed the colony, and instead passed through Romeo, just 3 miles (5 km) to the west.

The Colorado Pacific Rio Grande Railroad (formerly the San Luis & Rio Grande Railroad) is a class III railroad operating in south-central Colorado. It runs on 154 miles of former Denver and Rio Grande Western Railroad tracks on three lines radiating from Alamosa and interchanges with the Union Pacific Railroad in Walsenburg. Much of the railroad is located in the San Luis Valley. In 2022, it was purchased by Stefan Soloviev.

== Geography and climate ==
According to the United States Census Bureau, the town has a total area of 0.93 square miles (2.4 km^{2}), all land.

Manassa experiences a semi-arid climate (Köppen BSk) with cold, dry winters and warm, somewhat wetter summers.

Climate data for Manassa, Colorado (1991–2020 normals, extremes 1893–present)
| Month | Jan | Feb | Mar | Apr | May | Jun | Jul | Aug | Sep | Oct | Nov | Dec | Year |
|---|---|---|---|---|---|---|---|---|---|---|---|---|---|
| Record high °F (°C) | 64 (18) | 69 (21) | 82 (28) | 82 (28) | 95 (35) | 95 (35) | 94 (34) | 95 (35) | 89 (32) | 82 (28) | 78 (26) | 68 (20) | 95 (35) |
| Mean maximum °F (°C) | 48.6 (9.2) | 53.2 (11.8) | 65.4 (18.6) | 72.5 (22.5) | 80.3 (26.8) | 86.0 (30.0) | 88.3 (31.3) | 85.3 (29.6) | 81.7 (27.6) | 75.2 (24.0) | 63.6 (17.6) | 51.8 (11.0) | 89.0 (31.7) |
| Mean daily maximum °F (°C) | 34.9 (1.6) | 41.3 (5.2) | 52.6 (11.4) | 60.4 (15.8) | 69.1 (20.6) | 78.6 (25.9) | 80.6 (27.0) | 78.6 (25.9) | 73.3 (22.9) | 63.1 (17.3) | 48.8 (9.3) | 35.8 (2.1) | 59.8 (15.4) |
| Daily mean °F (°C) | 19.9 (−6.7) | 26.9 (−2.8) | 36.8 (2.7) | 44.1 (6.7) | 52.8 (11.6) | 61.3 (16.3) | 64.9 (18.3) | 62.9 (17.2) | 56.5 (13.6) | 45.7 (7.6) | 32.9 (0.5) | 21.0 (−6.1) | 43.8 (6.6) |
| Mean daily minimum °F (°C) | 5.0 (−15.0) | 12.5 (−10.8) | 20.9 (−6.2) | 27.9 (−2.3) | 36.5 (2.5) | 44.0 (6.7) | 49.2 (9.6) | 47.2 (8.4) | 39.7 (4.3) | 28.2 (−2.1) | 17.0 (−8.3) | 6.1 (−14.4) | 27.8 (−2.3) |
| Mean minimum °F (°C) | −11.2 (−24.0) | −7.8 (−22.1) | 3.3 (−15.9) | 11.6 (−11.3) | 22.0 (−5.6) | 32.5 (0.3) | 41.4 (5.2) | 39.4 (4.1) | 26.6 (−3.0) | 10.4 (−12.0) | −1.3 (−18.5) | −11.6 (−24.2) | −16.2 (−26.8) |
| Record low °F (°C) | −37 (−38) | −32 (−36) | −22 (−30) | −9 (−23) | 9 (−13) | 20 (−7) | 30 (−1) | 27 (−3) | 13 (−11) | −7 (−22) | −28 (−33) | −33 (−36) | −37 (−38) |
| Average precipitation inches (mm) | 0.21 (5.3) | 0.22 (5.6) | 0.43 (11) | 0.53 (13) | 0.59 (15) | 0.40 (10) | 1.08 (27) | 1.58 (40) | 1.12 (28) | 0.67 (17) | 0.49 (12) | 0.43 (11) | 7.75 (197) |
| Average snowfall inches (cm) | 4.6 (12) | 3.0 (7.6) | 5.5 (14) | 3.6 (9.1) | 0.4 (1.0) | 0.0 (0.0) | 0.0 (0.0) | 0.0 (0.0) | 0.0 (0.0) | 2.5 (6.4) | 4.5 (11) | 5.6 (14) | 29.7 (75) |
| Average precipitation days (≥ 0.01 in) | 2.3 | 2.7 | 3.0 | 3.3 | 4.0 | 3.6 | 8.6 | 9.3 | 6.8 | 4.0 | 2.8 | 2.7 | 53.1 |
| Average snowy days (≥ 0.1 in) | 2.7 | 2.3 | 2.4 | 1.7 | 0.4 | 0.0 | 0.0 | 0.0 | 0.0 | 1.0 | 1.8 | 2.7 | 15.0 |
Source: NOAA

== Demographics ==
Historical population
| Census | Pop. | Note | %± |
|---|---|---|---|
| 1880 | 250 | | — |
| 1890 | 642 | | 156.8% |
| 1900 | 739 | | 15.1% |
| 1910 | 788 | | 6.6% |
| 1920 | 906 | | 15.0% |
| 1930 | 953 | | 5.2% |
| 1940 | 1,008 | | 5.8% |
| 1950 | 832 | | −17.5% |
| 1960 | 831 | | −0.1% |
| 1970 | 814 | | −2.0% |
| 1980 | 945 | | 16.1% |
| 1990 | 988 | | 4.6% |
| 2000 | 1,042 | | 5.5% |
| 2010 | 991 | | −4.9% |
| 2020 | 947 | | −4.4% |

As of the census of 2000, there were 1,042 people, 362 households, and 280 families residing in the town. The population density was 1,110.9 inhabitants per square mile (428.9/km^{2}). There were 398 housing units at an average density of 424.3 units per square mile (163.8 units/km^{2}). The racial makeup of the town was 81.00% White, 0.48% African American, 1.63% Native American, 0.10% Asian, 0.19% Pacific Islander, 13.24% from other races, and 3.36% from two or more races. Hispanic or Latino of any race were 48.75% of the population.

There were 362 households, out of which 41.2% had children under the age of 18 living with them, 59.1% were married couples living together, 13.5% had a female householder with no husband present, and 22.4% were non-families. 20.7% of all households were made up of individuals, and 9.1% had someone living alone who was 65 years of age or older. The average household size was 2.88 and the average family size was 3.33.

In the town, the population was spread out, with 33.7% under the age of 18, 9.4% from 18 to 24, 22.9% from 25 to 44, 20.3% from 45 to 64, and 13.6% who were 65 years of age or older. The median age was 31 years. For every 100 females, there were 95.9 males. For every 100 females age 18 and over, there were 97.4 males.

The median income for a household in the town was $23,092, and the median income for a family was $26,827. Males had a median income of $23,295 versus $16,029 for females. The per capita income for the town was $12,576. About 23.2% of families and 28.6% of the population were below the poverty line, including 40.8% of those under age 18 and 19.4% of those age 65 or over.

== Streets ==
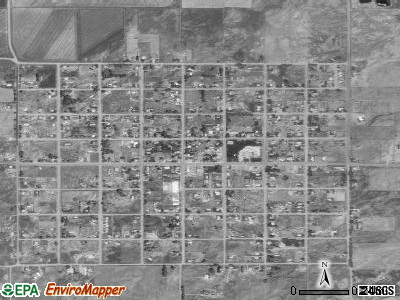
Satellite photograph showing the layout of Manassa's streets. Farmland and ranches abound in all directions, giving way to foothills and high mountains.

Manassa's wide streets, such as those typically found elsewhere in towns started by Mormons, are fashioned in a grid system. The town fits perfectly in a township and comprises close to one square mile, made up of eight blocks by eight blocks for a total of 64 city blocks. From east to west, the streets are numbered First through Ninth. From south to north, the streets are named South, Jack, Morgan, Smith, Main (aka State Highway 142), Berthelson, Peterson, Dotson, and North.

Manassa's mile-long Main Street is designated State Highway 142, connecting Romeo and U.S. Route 285 3 miles (5 km) to the west, with the historic town of San Luis in Costilla County 29 miles (47 km) to the east. The San Luis Hills are east of Manassa, on State Highway 142, between Manassa and San Luis.

== Pioneer Days ==
The community celebrates Manassa Pioneer Days.

The rocks on the nearby mountain with its painted letter M are doused with kerosene and the burning spectacle lights up the night sky for several hours. Held annually for two days around July 24, this is one of the oldest festivals in the state, with the 146th annual celebration being held in 2025.

Each year, attendance for Manassa Pioneer Days is estimated at close to 10,000 per day.

== Transportation ==
Travel connections to major cities are generally made at Colorado Springs, Denver, or Albuquerque.

With daily flights to Denver, the nearest commercial airport San Luis Valley Regional Airport is in Alamosa 24 miles (39 km) to the north. Alamosa is the most populated municipality and the main trading center for the San Luis Valley.

== Schools ==
Manassa students attend public schools in the North Conejos School District RE1-J. There is an elementary school in Manassa, but older students attend the district's middle school (Centauri Middle School) and high school (Centauri High School) about 10 miles (16 km) north and west of Manassa, just south of the town of La Jara. The high school teams are the Falcons, and the school colors are red and white.

== Higher education ==
Students from Manassa who don't want to travel far or wish to remain in the area, can get their higher education in nearby Alamosa. With a population of about 8,500, Alamosa is the home of Adams State University where students can earn undergraduate and graduate degrees in a wide variety of disciplines.

Alamosa is also home to a branch campus of Trinidad State College, a two-year community college, which offers a considerable selection of courses including Massage, Nursing, Welding, Auto and Diesel Mechanics and Law Enforcement Training.

== Churches ==
There are two churches in Manassa: St. Therese of the Child Jesus Catholic Church, and a meetinghouse for The Church of Jesus Christ of Latter-day Saints.

== Hospitals ==
Conejos County Hospital is a critical access hospital in La Jara, Colorado, in Conejos County. The hospital has 17 beds and is a Level IV trauma center, serving Conejos and Costilla counties in the San Luis Valley. It is the only emergency service provider in the two counties in the 2,514 square mile area.

The hospital was established in 1963. It was originally started and staffed by Mennonites who continued running the hospital through the 1970s. The hospital completed a $6 million expansion in 2019, which included an upgrade to its emergency rooms.

The hospital is one of two hospitals (and several regional clinics) that make up San Luis Valley Health (SLV Health), a small hospital network founded in 2013. The other hospital in the network is the San Luis Valley Regional Medical Center in Alamosa.

== Tourism ==
Manassa counts many nearby attractions, including the Great Sand Dunes National Park and Preserve, Cumbres and Toltec Scenic Railroad, Colorado Gators Reptile Park, the Rio Grande Scenic Railroad, Fort Garland Museum, UFO Watchtower, and the Stations of the Crosses site in nearby San Luis, Colorado, which is the oldest town in the State of Colorado.

Our Lady of Guadeloupe Catholic Church, the oldest church in Colorado, founded in 1858, 18 years before Colorado's statehood is located in nearby Conejos, about 10 miles (16 km) southwest of Manassa, near the town of Antonito.

== Notable people ==
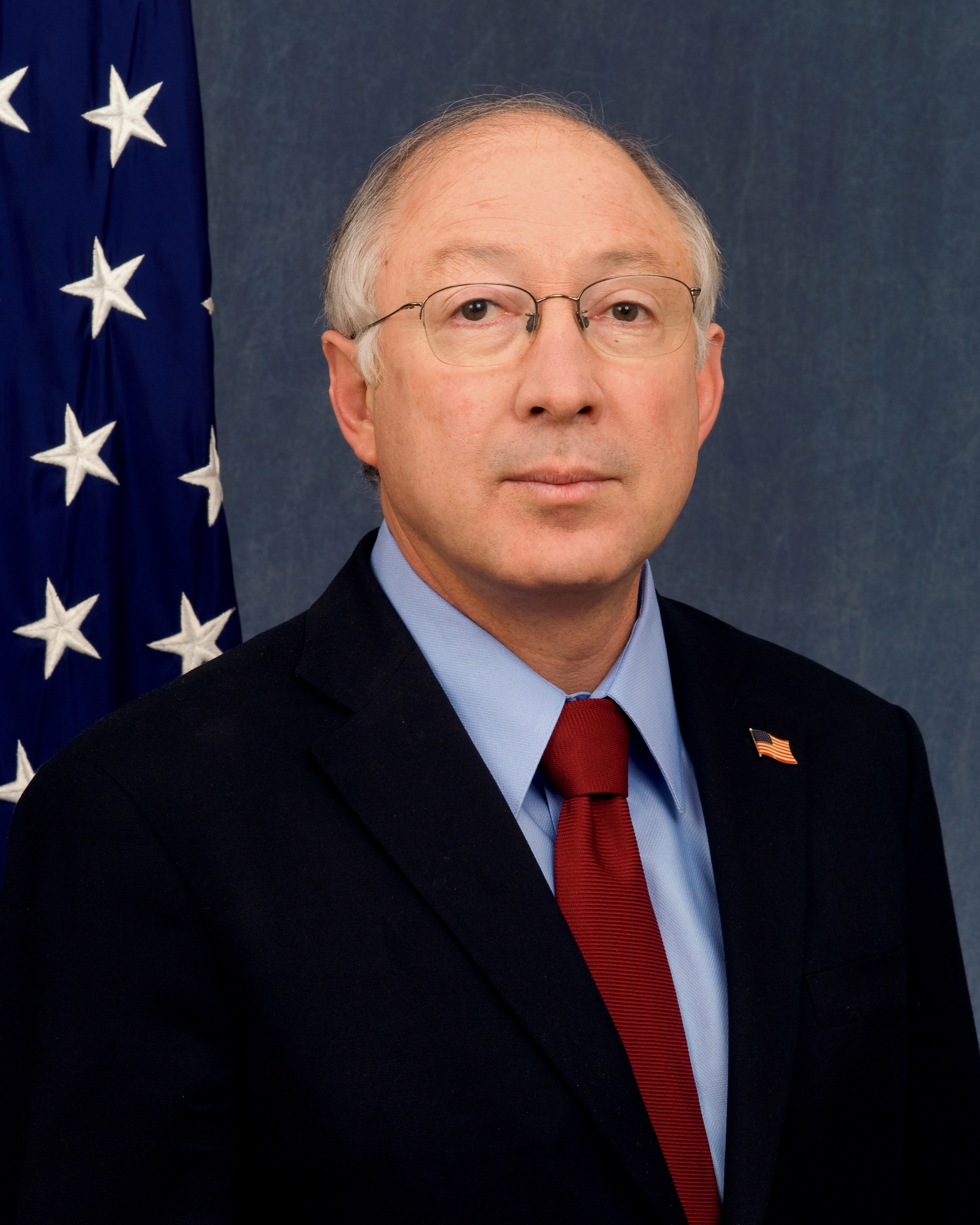
United States Ambassador to Mexico, former Secretary of the U. S. Department of the Interior and former U. S. Senator Kenneth L. Salazar, D-Colorado

- Jack Dempsey (aka The Manassa Mauler). William Harrison "Jack" Dempsey was an American professional heavyweight champion boxer The Jack Dempsey Museum honors the legacy and memory of the famous boxing champion.
- Ken Salazar, Appointed by President Joe R. Biden to serve as United States Ambassador to Mexico, former Secretary of the United States Department of the Interior, former U.S. senator, Democrat, first elected 2004 for a six-year term. Former Attorney General for the State of Colorado.
- John Salazar, served as Commissioner of the Colorado Department of Agriculture from 2011 to 2015 and U.S. representative from Colorado's 3rd congressional district from 2005 to 2011. John Salazar is the brother of Ken Salazar.

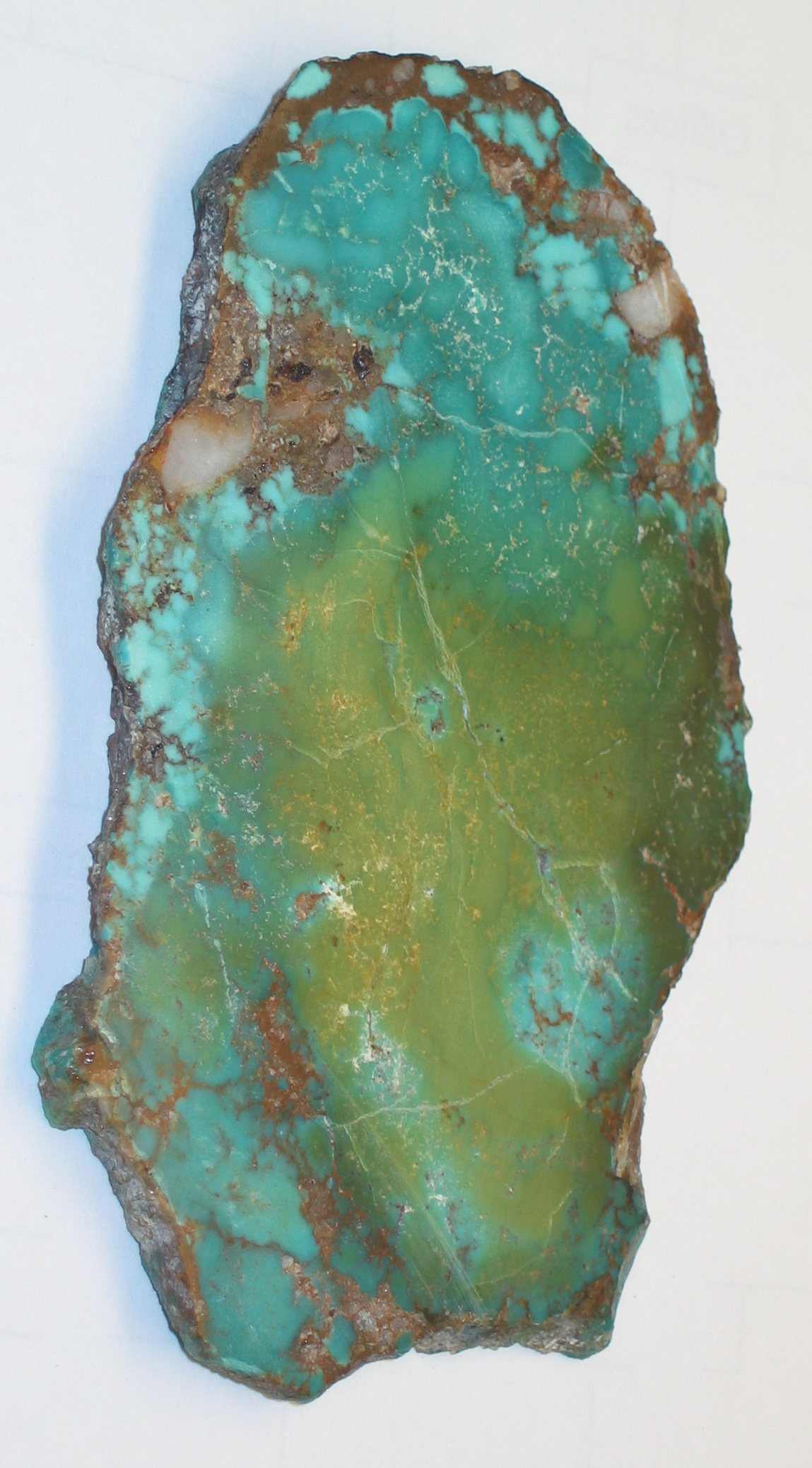
Slab of turquoise in matrix showing a large variety of different coloration

== Turquoise mine ==
Mantissa turquoise is mined east of Manassa. It is known for its blue-green to green color with a golden or brown, non-webbed matrix. The Manassa mine is still in production and owned by the King family, thus the alternate name sometimes used for this turquoise.

This site, originally mined by Ancestral Pueblo peoples, was rediscovered in 1890 by gold prospector I.P. King, and his descendants still work the claim. King's Manassa turquoise is best known for its brilliant greens and golden matrices, but blue and blue-green turquoise was found amid these deposits as well.

== Federal lands ==
The Conejos River is a tributary of the Rio Grande, approximately 92.5 miles (148.9 km) long, in south-central Colorado in the United States. It drains a scenic area of the eastern San Juan Mountains west of the San Luis Valley. Trout fishing is popular on the Conejos River.

The Rio Grande National Forest is a 1.86 million-acre (7,530 km2) U.S. National Forest located in southwestern Colorado. The forest encompasses the San Luis Valley, which is the world's largest agricultural alpine valley, as well as one of the world's largest high deserts located around mountains. The Rio Grande rises in the forest, and the Continental Divide runs along most of its western border. The forest lies in parts of nine counties. In descending order of land area within the forest they are Saguache, Mineral, Conejos, Rio Grande, Hinsdale, San Juan, Alamosa, Archuleta, and Custer counties. Forest headquarters are currently located in Monte Vista, Colorado, but plan to move to Del Norte. There are local ranger district offices in Del Norte, La Jara, and Saguache.

The San Luis Hills WSA are a group of small mountain ranges in Conejos and Costilla counties in the San Luis Valley in southern Colorado. The individual mountain ranges that make up the San Luis Hills include the Fairy Hills, the Brownie Hills, the Piñon Hills, and the South Piñon Hills. The San Luis Hills' highest point is Flat Top, elevation 9,206 feet (2,806 meters).

The South San Juan Wilderness is a U.S. Wilderness Area located in the San Juan National Forest, east of Pagosa Springs, in southern Colorado. The area, which spans 158,790 acres, was designated a Wilderness Area and put into the National Wilderness Preservation System in 1980 by the United States Congress.

The Conejos, San Juan, and Blanco rivers all begin in the area.

The last known grizzly bear in Colorado was killed in the wilderness in 1979.

== Media ==
The Valley Courier in Alamosa and The SLV Dweller "a website dedicated to all things San Luis Valley," are two media outlets covering events in and near Manassa.

== Political representation ==
- Colorado State House District 62: Matthew Martinez, D-Monte Vista
- Colorado State Senate District 6: Cleave Simpson, R-Alamosa
- U. S. Representative District 3: Jeff Hurd, R-Grand Junction
- United States Senators: John Hickenlooper (D), and Michael Bennet (D)

== Government ==
Town Hall, 401 Main Street, PO Box 130, Manassa, Colorado 81141 (719) 843–5207

== See also ==
- Conejos County, Colorado
- San Luis Valley
