= Costilla Creek =

Tributary of the Rio Grande

Costilla Creek Río Costilla, Costilla River, Costilla Creek Number One, Río de Costilla
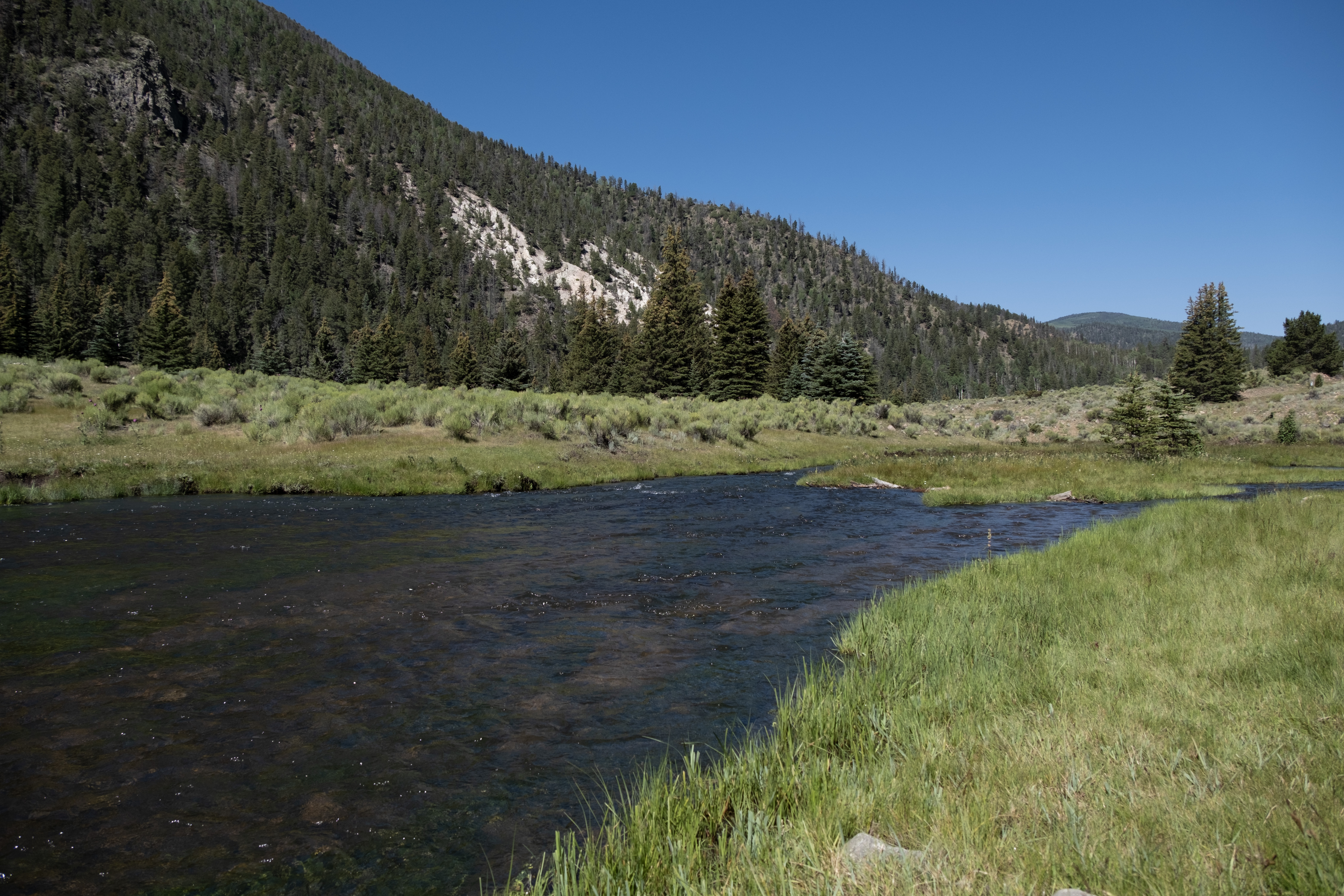
- Costilla Creek, pictured from the Rio Costilla Campground in 2024.

- Location of the creek's mouth in Taos County, New Mexico

Location
- Country: United States
- States: Colorado, New Mexico
- Counties: Costilla County, Colorado, Taos County, New Mexico

Physical characteristics
- Source: Confluence of West Fork Costilla Creek and East Fork Costilla Creek
  - location: Costilla County, Colorado
  - coordinates: 36°59′45″N 105°15′04″W
- Mouth: Rio Grande
  - location: Taos County, New Mexico
  - coordinates: 36°58′51″N 105°43′03″W
  - elevation: 7,369 feet (2,246 meters)
- Discharge
  - location: Rio Grande

Costilla Creek is a tributary of the Rio Grande in Colorado and New Mexico.

== Course ==
The creek rises in the Sangre de Cristo Mountains in far southern Colorado at the confluence of East Fork Costilla Creek and West Fork Costilla Creek. It then flows southward across the border into New Mexico. Here it is impounded by the privately held Costilla Reservoir on the Vermejo Park Ranch.

From there, it flows generally southwest, receiving the waters of its tributary Comanche Creek at the north end of Valle Vidal. Costilla Creek then begins to curve towards the northwest towards a point where it meets New Mexico State Road 196.

The creek then travels generally northwestward, following alongside State Road 196 through the small town of Amalia. It leaves the mountains after passing through a diversion dam — the beginning of the Acequia Madre irrigation ditch — and just before flowing through the town of Costilla, entering the broad, flat plain of the Taos Plateau volcanic field.

Flowing north from Costilla, the creek enters Colorado at Garcia. It then flows in a broad semi-circle to the west, eventually flowing to the south, just west of Jaroso, Colorado and crossing the border, once again entering into New Mexico. Soon after crossing the border, the creek turns to the southwest and empties into the Rio Grande, its mouth in a gorge just to the northwest of Ute Mountain.

== Fishing ==
Popular with anglers, the creek offers fishing for rainbow trout, brown trout, and Rio Grande cutthroat trout. The Rio Costilla is stocked on a regular basis with trout from spring to fall. The New Mexico Department of Game and Fish implemented the final phase of the Restoration of Rio Grande Cutthroat Trout (Oncorhynchus clarki virginalis) and the Native Fish Community to the Upper Rio Costilla Watershed project in March 2021, which should be complete by the fall of 2021. The removal of non-native fish such as non-native rainbow trout and non-native suckers through this initiative should provide high-quality angling opportunities for native trout and expand the range of interconnected populations of Rio Grande cutthroat trout and other native fish, decreasing their likelihood of becoming threatened or endangered species.

== Climate ==
The North Costilla SNOTEL weather station is near the confluence of the east and west forks of Costilla Creek, at an elevation of 10600 feet (3231 m).

Climate data for North Costilla, New Mexico, 1991–2020 normals, 1988-2020 extremes: 10600ft (3231m)
Month	Jan	Feb	Mar	Apr	May	Jun	Jul	Aug	Sep	Oct	Nov	Dec	Year
Record high °F (°C)	60 (16)	62 (17)	64 (18)	65 (18)	78 (26)	89 (32)	83 (28)	80 (27)	75 (24)	71 (22)	66 (19)	58 (14)	89 (32)
Mean daily maximum °F (°C)	35.0 (1.7)	35.7 (2.1)	41.2 (5.1)	45.5 (7.5)	53.3 (11.8)	63.5 (17.5)	67.0 (19.4)	65.6 (18.7)	60.6 (15.9)	51.1 (10.6)	41.7 (5.4)	35.0 (1.7)	49.6 (9.8)
Daily mean °F (°C)	23.8 (−4.6)	24.7 (−4.1)	29.8 (−1.2)	34.7 (1.5)	42.2 (5.7)	51.6 (10.9)	55.3 (12.9)	54.3 (12.4)	49.5 (9.7)	40.3 (4.6)	31.0 (−0.6)	24.3 (−4.3)	38.5 (3.6)
Mean daily minimum °F (°C)	12.5 (−10.8)	13.6 (−10.2)	18.5 (−7.5)	23.7 (−4.6)	31.1 (−0.5)	39.7 (4.3)	43.6 (6.4)	43.0 (6.1)	38.2 (3.4)	29.4 (−1.4)	20.4 (−6.4)	13.6 (−10.2)	27.3 (−2.6)
Record low °F (°C)	−21 (−29)	−26 (−32)	−16 (−27)	−3 (−19)	9 (−13)	12 (−11)	23 (−5)	23 (−5)	12 (−11)	2 (−17)	−8 (−22)	−21 (−29)	−26 (−32)
Average precipitation inches (mm)	1.74 (44)	1.99 (51)	2.70 (69)	2.86 (73)	1.77 (45)	1.14 (29)	2.76 (70)	3.06 (78)	1.88 (48)	1.88 (48)	2.10 (53)	2.11 (54)	25.99 (662)
Source 1: XMACIS2
Source 2: NOAA (Precipitation)
