= Mesita, Colorado =

Unincorporated community in Costilla County, CO, USA

- Unincorporated community
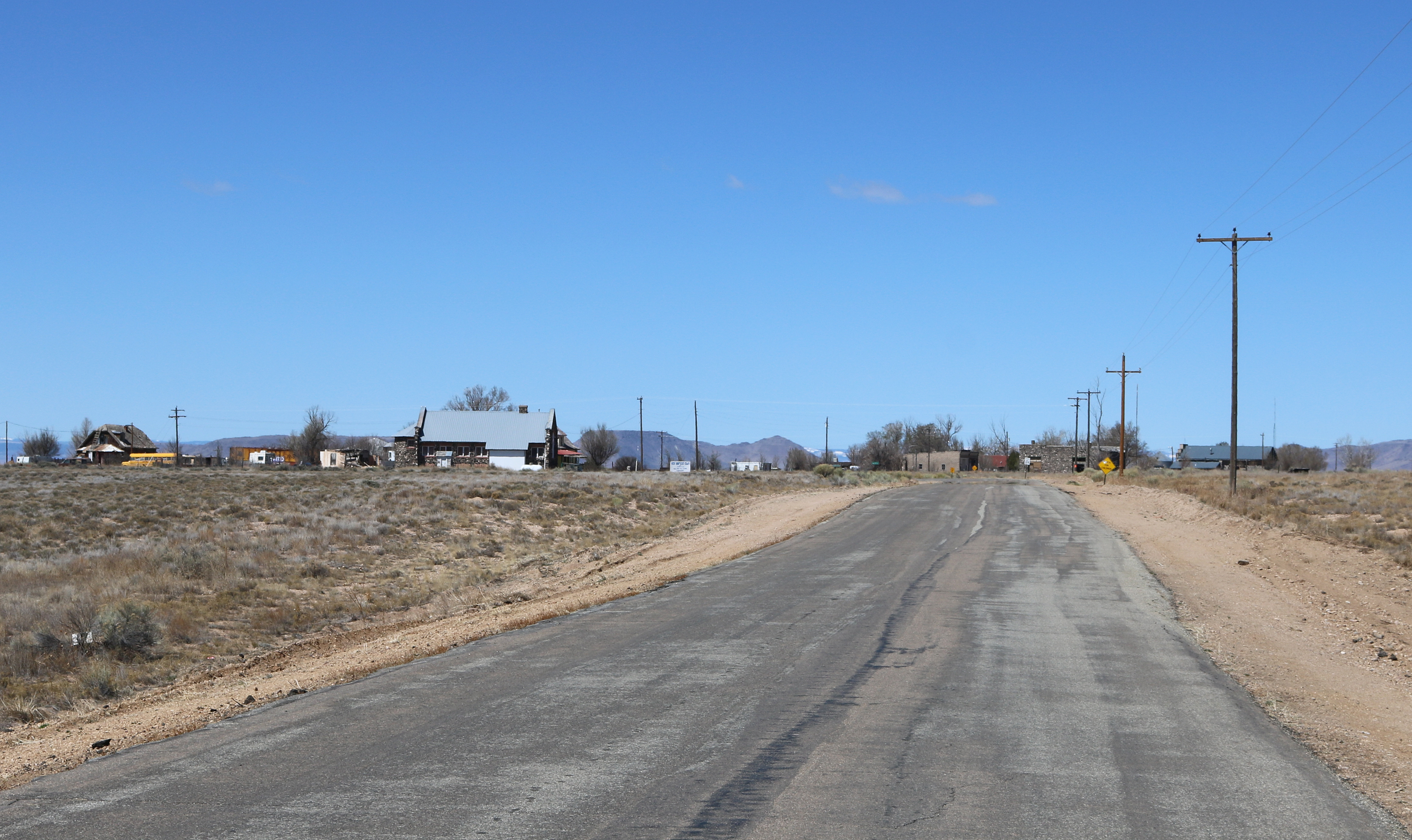
- Mesita, viewed from the east along CR H.

- Location in Costilla County and the state of Colorado Mesita, Colorado (the United States)
- Coordinates: 37°05′54″N 105°36′07″W
- Country: United States
- State: Colorado
- County: Costilla
- Elevation: 7,674 ft (2,339 m)
- Time zone: UTC-7 (MST)
  - Summer (DST): UTC-6 (MDT)
- ZIP Code: 81152
- Area code: 719
- GNIS feature: 204792

Mesita, (Spanish for "small table") is an unincorporated community located in Costilla County, Colorado, United States. The San Luis post office (Zip Code 81152) serves Mesita postal addresses.

== Reported UFO Activity ==
Mesita is reportedly the site of some of the San Luis Valley cow mutilations. Two cows and one horse were found east of Mesita with unexplainable mutilations, including a rectal coring, and signs of being dropped from a great height.
