= R&R Market =

Merchandise and grocery store in San Luis, Colorado

Coordinates: 37.1992°N 105.4265°W

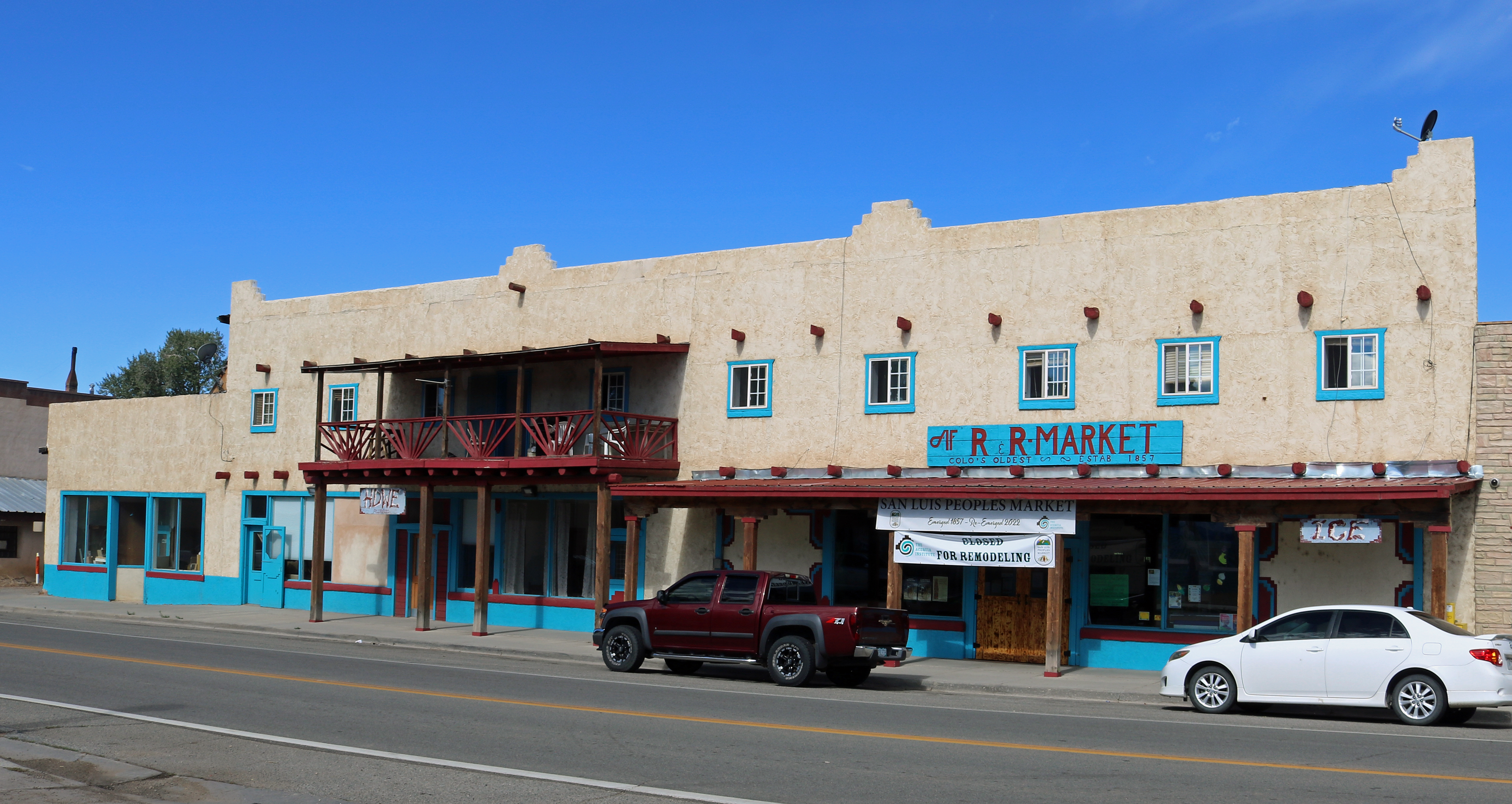
- The market in 2023
- Founded: 1857
- Headquarters: Colorado

R&R Market is a general merchandise and grocery store in San Luis, Colorado. Built in 1857, it is the oldest continually operating business in the state.

== History ==
Dario Gallegos opened R&R Market with $452 in May 1857. The business was established by a family of Spanish conquistadors. The store was originally made of 25-inch adobe bricks and has a foundation of rocks with mud mortar. R&R Market survived an attack by Native Americans in 1858 and fires in 1895 and 1945 that almost destroyed it. The store's brick walls were eventually reinforced with stucco, concrete, and plaster. The store building was constructed in territorial adobe style.

Gallegos's descendants managed R&R Market until it was put up for sale in 2017.

=== Sale and renaming ===
In early 2022, the market was sold to the Acequia Institute, a non-profit organization based in Viejo San Acacio, Colorado. The institute has changed the business's name to San Luis People's Market and hopes to convert it to a community-based, worker-led food cooperative. The market's Facebook page, in a July 25, 2023 post, announced that the market was closing temporarily "for major remodeling and environmental cleanup involving asbestos, lead paint, and possibly black mold abatement."
