= Colorado State Highway 159 =

State highway in Colorado, United States

State Highway 159
- Map of Costilla County in southern Colorado with SH 159 highlighted in red

Route information
- Maintained by CDOT
- Length: 33.661 mi (54.172 km)

Major junctions
- South end: NM 522 at the New Mexico state line in Garcia
- SH 142 San Luis
- North end: US 160 near Fort Garland

Location
- Country: United States
- State: Colorado
- Counties: Costilla

Highway system
- Colorado State Highway System; Interstate; US; State; Scenic
← SH 157	→ US 160

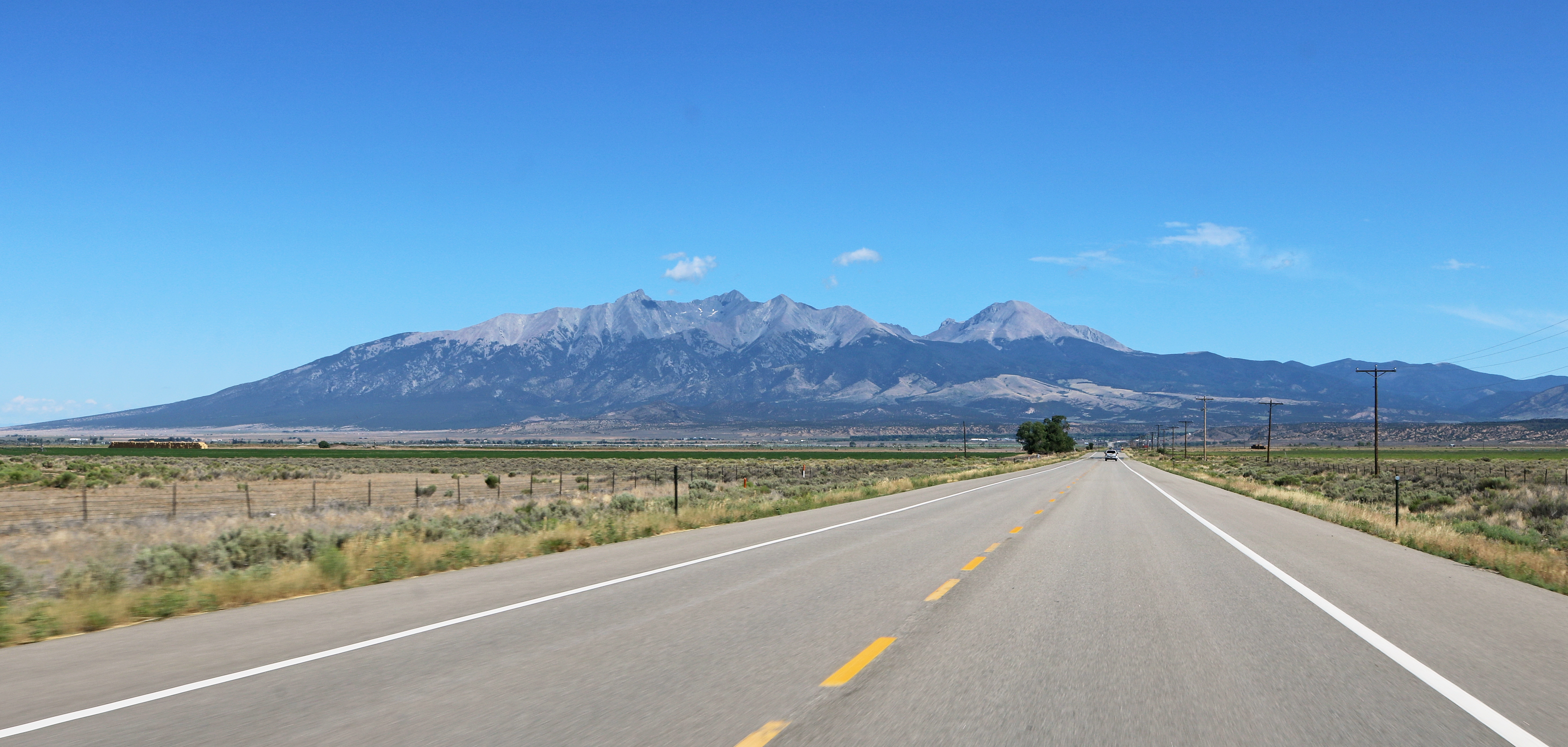
Looking north along the highway from a point south of Fort Garland

State Highway 159 (SH 159) is a 33.661-mile-long (54.172 km) state highway in far southern Colorado. SH 159's southern terminus is a continuation as New Mexico State Road 522 (NM 522) at the New Mexico state line, and the northern terminus is at U.S. Route 160 (US 160) near Fort Garland.

== Route description ==
SH 159 starts in the south at the New Mexico state line where the road becomes NM 522 which heads south towards Taos, NM. From the state line the road heads north to meet US 160 at its north end just outside Fort Garland. There is only one town along the route, San Luis, which is at the road's midpoint. San Luis is also the site of SH 159's junction with SH 142, the only significant junction along the route.

== History ==
The route was established in the 1920s and paved by 1938. The route remains as it was when established.

== Major intersections ==
The entire route is in Costilla County.

Location	mi	km	Destinations	Notes
	0.000	0.000	NM 522 – Taos	Continuation beyond New Mexico state line; Southern terminus
San Luis	17.929	28.854	SH 142 west – Romeo	Eastern terminus of SH 142
	33.661	54.172	US 160 – Alamosa, Walsenburg	Northern terminus
1.000 mi = 1.609 km; 1.000 km = 0.621 mi
