= Amalia, New Mexico =

Unincorporated community in Taos County, New Mexico, United States

- unincorporated community
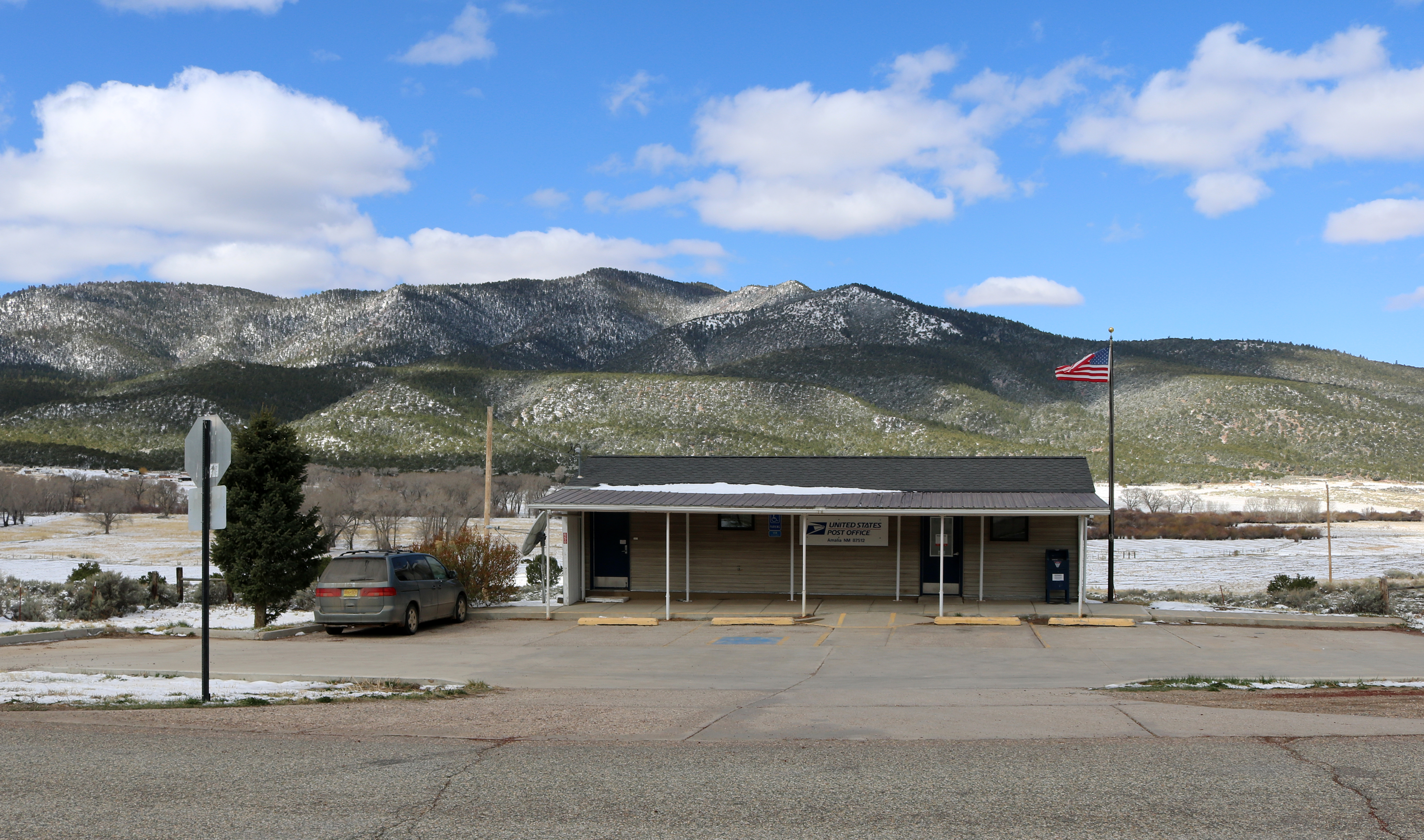
- The post office in Amalia

- Location of Amalia in New Mexico and the United States Amalia, New Mexico (the United States)
- Coordinates: 36°56′31″N 105°27′16″W
- Country: United States
- States: New Mexico
- County: Taos
- Elevation: 8,147 ft (2,483 m)
- Time zone: UTC−7 (Mountain (MST))
  - Summer (DST): UTC−6 (MDT)
- ZIP code: 87512
- Area code: 575
- GNIS feature ID: 902162
- Website: amalianm.com

Amalia is an unincorporated community in Taos County, New Mexico, United States. A valley town nestled between many mountains in the Sangre De Cristo mountain range.

The Costilla Creek runs alongside the community.

== Description ==
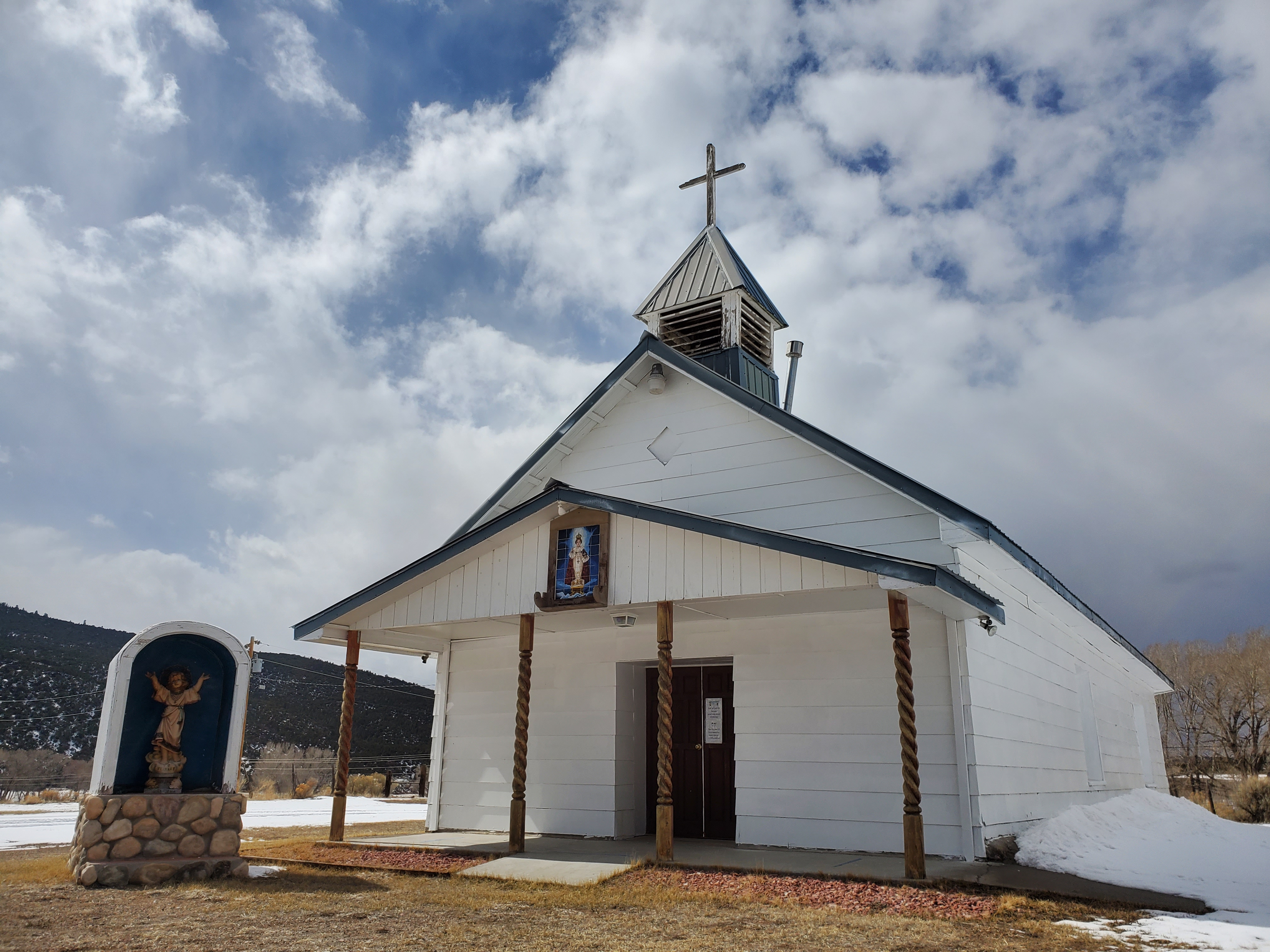
Santo Niño Catholic Church

Amalia is located near the Colorado border, on New Mexico State Road 196.

Amalia has a post office, with the ZIP code 87512. The 87512 ZIP Code Tabulation Area had a population of 230 at the 2000 census. As of the 2020 census the Zip Code Tabulation Area population was reported at 213. In the 1940 census the population was reported at 558.

== History ==
Amalia was formerly known as Pina, perhaps a modification of the Spanish word for 'pine'. A post office was established in 1900; in 1919, the settlement was renamed after the given name for unknown reasons.

Amalia was established in 1849 by settlers who arrived through the Sangre De Cristo Land Grant. In 1902, the Defensive Association of the Land Settlers of Rio Costilla was formed to advocate for the settlers and their families in retaining ownership of their land. Between 1902 and 1921, numerous court battles were fought, but many resulted in decisions against the settlers. In 1921, the association disbanded, but settlers continued their fight. In 1941, a resolution was sent to many government officials, including former Governor Miles, President Franklin D. Roosevelt, the Farm Security Administration (FSA), other New Mexico state politicians, and the press. The resolution expressed the objection of the sale of land to Thomas Campbell by the State Tax Commission. Once again, the law was not in favor of the settlers. However, in 1942, with the help of a loan from the FSA, they were able to repurchase their land. Around this same time, the Rio Costilla Cooperative Livestock Association (RCCLA), primarily made up of the children of the Defensive Association members, was established. The RCCLA continues to advocate for settlers, along with owning and operating a piece of the grant.

In summer of 2018, at a remote site with a small camping trailer within a surrounding wall of car tires, five adults, 11 hungry children (ages 1 to 15), and later a dead child, were found. Court documents stated the children had been trained for shootings at schools. Federal terrorism, kidnapping, and firearms charges were brought against the five adults in March 2019; in 2024, one was sentenced to 15 years in prison and the other four to a life sentence under a federal kidnapping statute minimum sentencing dating to the Lindbergh kidnapping.

== Recreation ==
Amalia is home to the Ute Creek Ranch, a boarding and training facility for horses. Ute Creek Ranch offers training from a multidisciplinary perspective in dressage, jumping, and natural horsemanship.

Many outdoor recreation opportunities exist in Amalia, including birdwatching, camping, RVing, cross country skiing, hunting, fishing, hiking, horseback riding, mountain biking, photography and painting, river rafting, snowshoeing, and wildlife viewing.

The Rio Castillo Park is also located in Amalia.

== Education ==
Amalia is zoned in the Questa Independent School District
