= San Acacio, Colorado =

Census-designated place in Costilla County, CO, USA

- Census-designated place
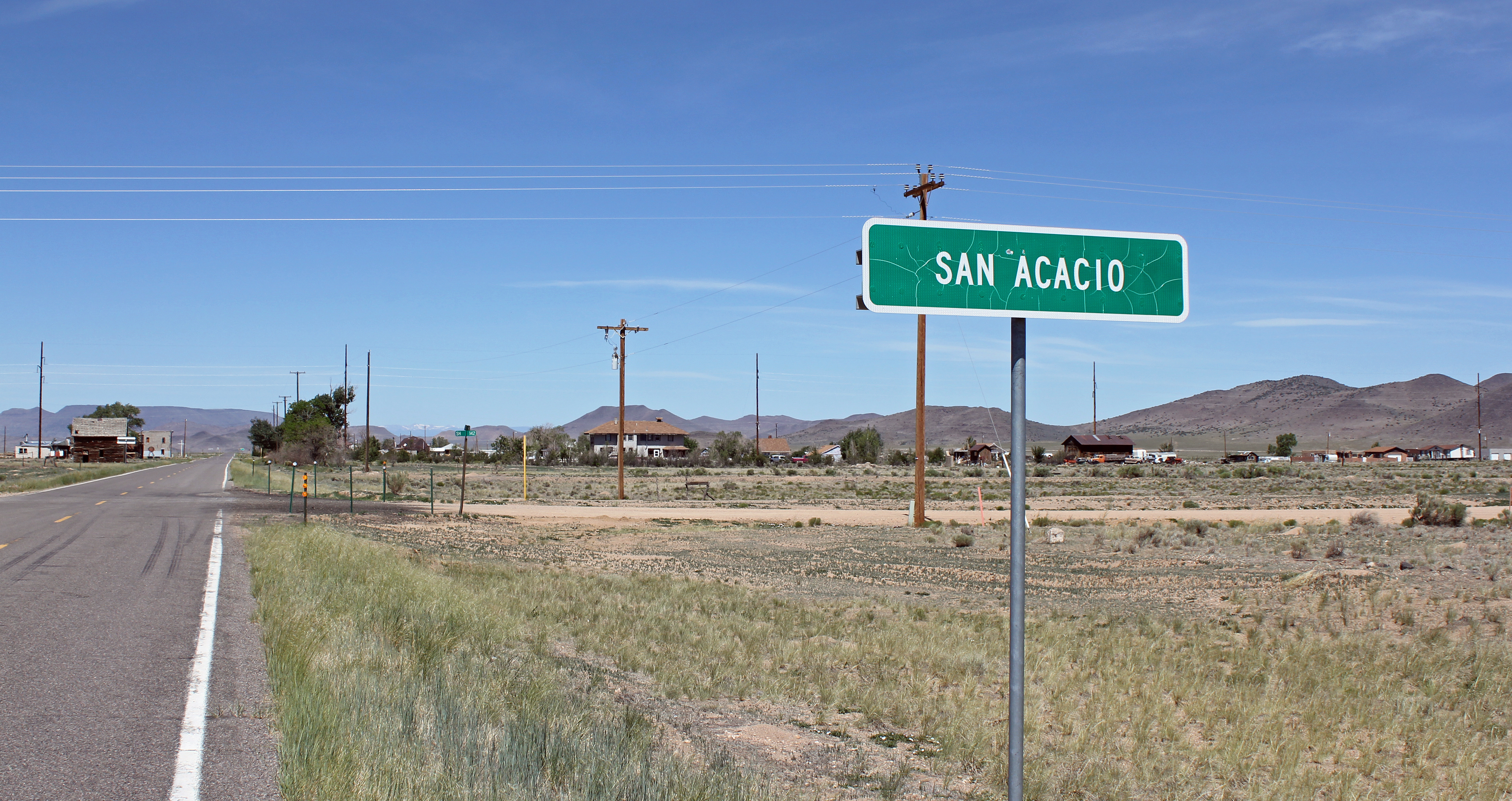
- Entering San Acacio from the east on State Highway 142.

- Location of the San Acacio CDP in Costilla County, Colorado.

- Location of the San Acacio CDP in the United States.
- Coordinates: 37°12′31″N 105°34′00″W
- Country: United States
- State: Colorado
- County: Costilla County
- Founded: 1850

Government
  - Type: unincorporated community

Area
  - Total: 1.257 sq mi (3.255 km^{2})
  - Land: 1.257 sq mi (3.255 km^{2})
  - Water: 0 sq mi (0.000 km^{2})
- Elevation: 7,720 ft (2,350 m)

Population (2020)
  - Total: 56
  - Density: 45/sq mi (17/km^{2})
- Time zone: UTC-7 (MST)
  - Summer (DST): UTC-6 (MDT)
- ZIP Code: 81151
- Area code: 719
- GNIS feature: 2583291

San Acacio is an unincorporated community and a census-designated place (CDP) located in and governed by Costilla County, Colorado, United States. The population of the San Acacio CDP was 56 at the 2020 United States census. The Sanford post office (Zip Code 81151) serves San Acacio postal addresses.

== History ==
San Acacio is located in the Rio Culebra valley of the Sangre de Cristo Land Grant which was awarded to the family of Carlos Beaubien in 1843. The San Acacio Post Office was established in 1909 and remained in operation until 1992. The community was named after Saint Acacius.

=== Historic buildings and landmarks ===
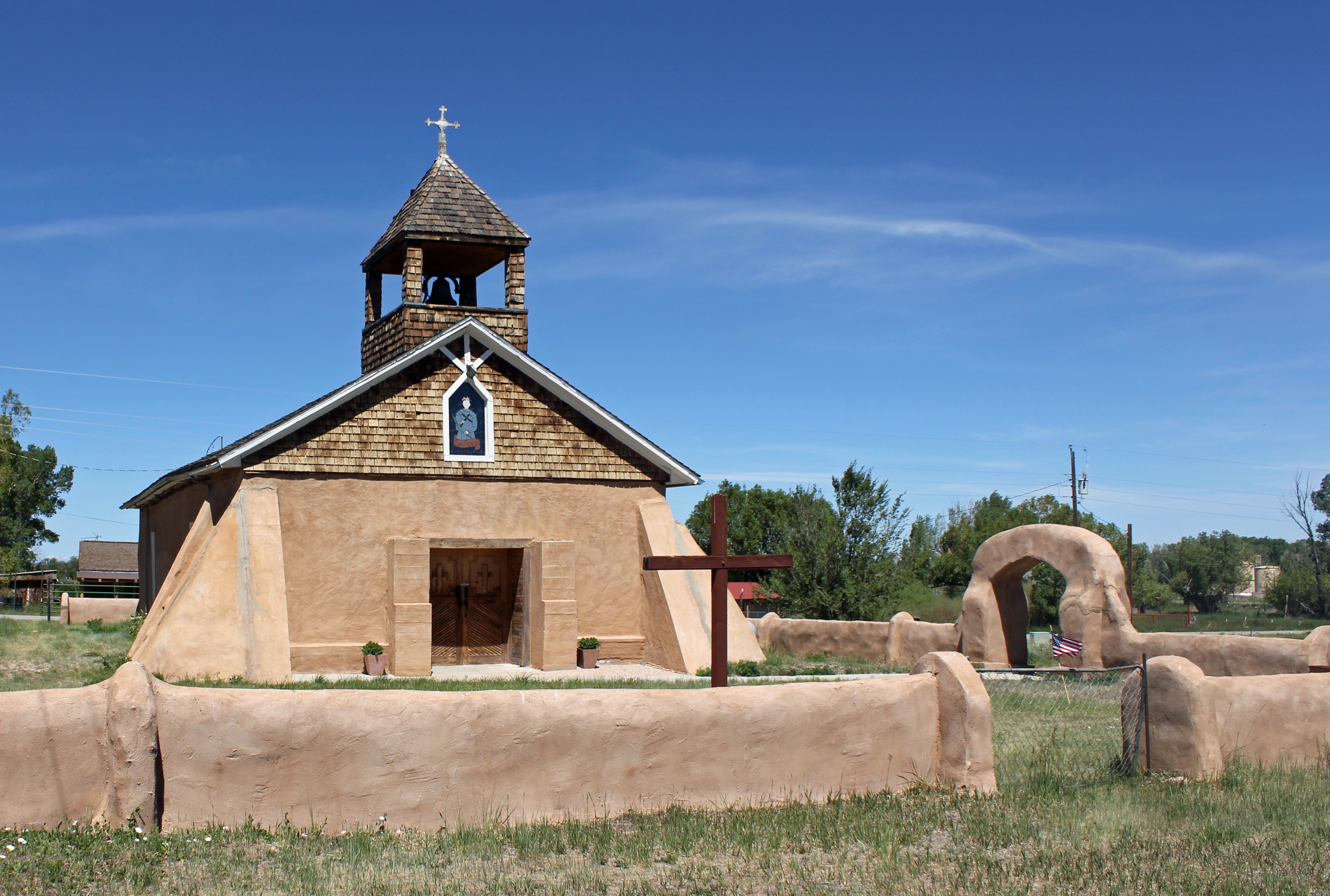
The Capilla de Viejo San Acacio in Viejo San Acacio

- San Acacio Mission Church (Capilla de Viejo San Acacio) – Built early in the 1860s, the Mission of San Acacio is the oldest standing church in Colorado. Constructed with 24-inch adobe walls, the mission underwent extensive restoration during the 1990s. In addition to stabilizing the foundation, several wooden columns were added to the interior to take the weight of the roof off the fragile walls. An altar screen, or retablo, was commissioned from Maria Romero Cash, a New Mexican artist specializing in religious folk art.
- San Acacio Bank
- Old San Acacio Cemetery – In old San Acacio there is a cemetery nicknamed Viejo Cemetery. The cemetery is located in a churchyard in Old San Acacio. The oldest marked grave in the cemetery is from 1907, and the cemetery is currently full.
- New San Acacio Cemetery – The new cemetery is located 3/4 mile south of San Acacio. It is a public cemetery, and the oldest marked grave in the cemetery is from 1906. It is currently in use.

== Geography ==
San Acacio is located in western Costilla County in the San Luis Valley of southern Colorado. Colorado State Highway 142 runs through San Acacio, leading east 8 miles (13 km) to San Luis and west 25 miles (40 km) to U.S. Route 285 at Romeo.

The San Acacio CDP has an area of 804 acres (3.255 km^{2}), all land.

== Demographics ==
The United States Census Bureau initially defined the San Acacio CDP for the United States Census 2010.

San Acacio CDP, Colorado
Year	Pop.	±%
2010	40	—
2020	56	+40.0%
Source: United States Census Bureau
