= San Luis Hills =

Mountain ranges in Colorado, United States

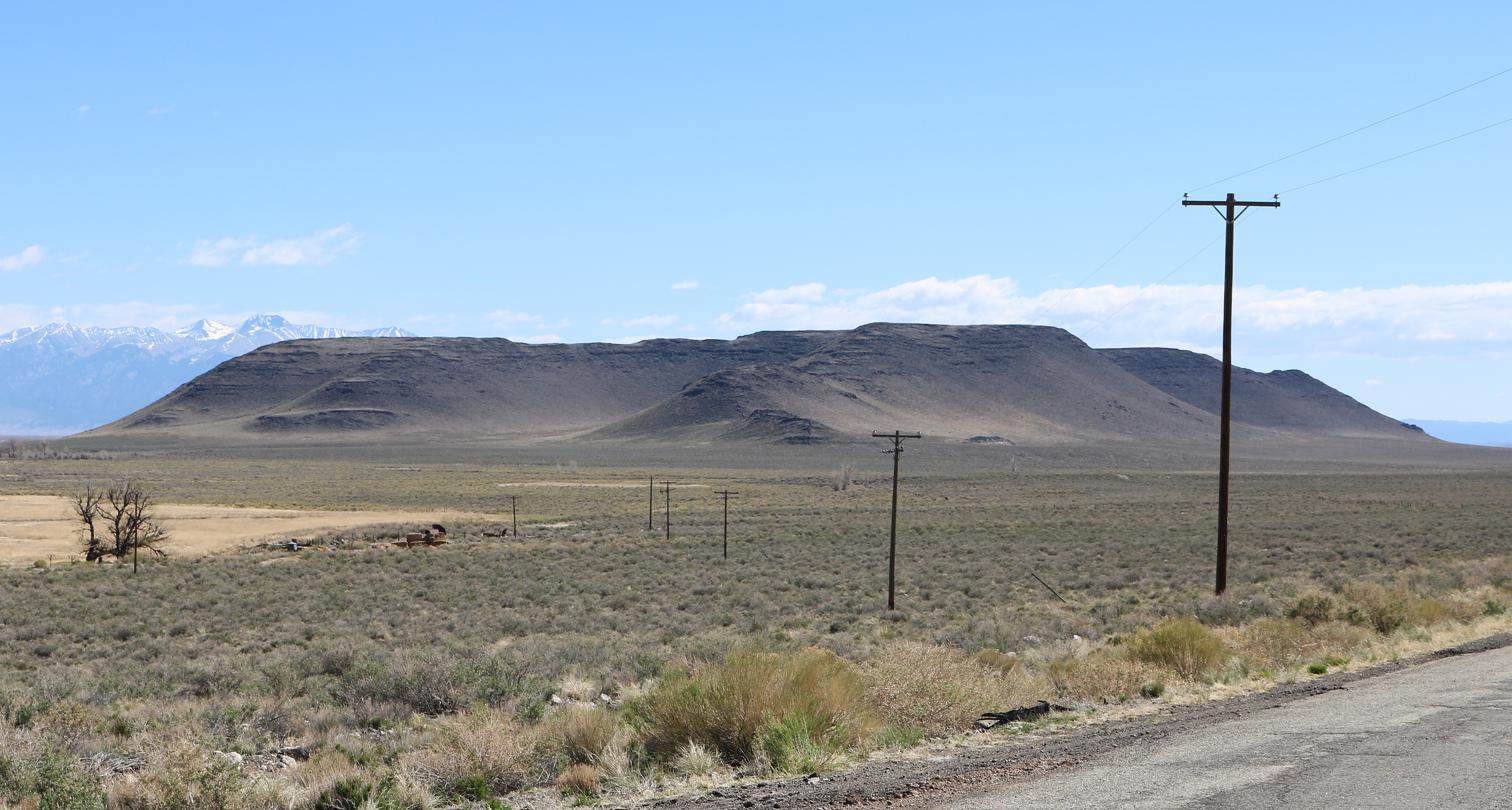
- Sierro del Ojito in the Fairy Hills section of the San Luis Hills

Highest point
- Elevation: 9,206 ft (2,806 m)
- Coordinates: 37°10′0″N 105°44′32″W

Dimensions
- Area: 428 mi^{2} (1,110 km^{2})

Geography
- Location: San Luis Valley
- Country: United States
- State: Colorado

The San Luis Hills are a group of small mountain ranges in Conejos and Costilla counties in the San Luis Valley in southern Colorado. The individual mountain ranges that make up the San Luis Hills include the Fairy Hills, the Brownie Hills, the Piñon Hills, and the South Piñon Hills. The San Luis Hills' highest point is Flat Top, elevation 9,206 feet (2,806 meters).

== Geographical setting ==
Each of the separate mountain ranges includes flat-topped mesas and hills, and the ranges trend from the southwest to the northeast. Because the individual hills rise from the floor of the San Luis Valley, which is about 7,500 feet (2,300 meters) in elevation, they appear more as hills than mountains, despite rising to eight or nine thousand feet above sea level.

The Hills are all within the Sangre de Cristo National Heritage Area.

== Individual ranges ==
=== Fairy Hills ===
The Fairy Hills lie at 37°12′37″N 105°45′14″W. They are north of Colorado State Highway 142 and west of the Rio Grande in Conejos County.

=== Brownie Hills ===
The Brownie Hills lie at 37°12′39″N 105°42′50″W. They are north of Colorado State Highway 142 and east of the Rio Grande, in Costilla County.

=== Piñon Hills ===
The Piñon Hills lie at 37°07′50″N 105°49′02″W. They are south of Colorado State Highway 142 and west of the Rio Grande, in Conejos County.

=== South Piñon Hills ===
The South Piñon Hills lie at 37°04′17″N 105°48′31″W. As their name indicates, they are south of the Piñon Hills in Conejos County, and just north of the New Mexico border.

== Geology ==
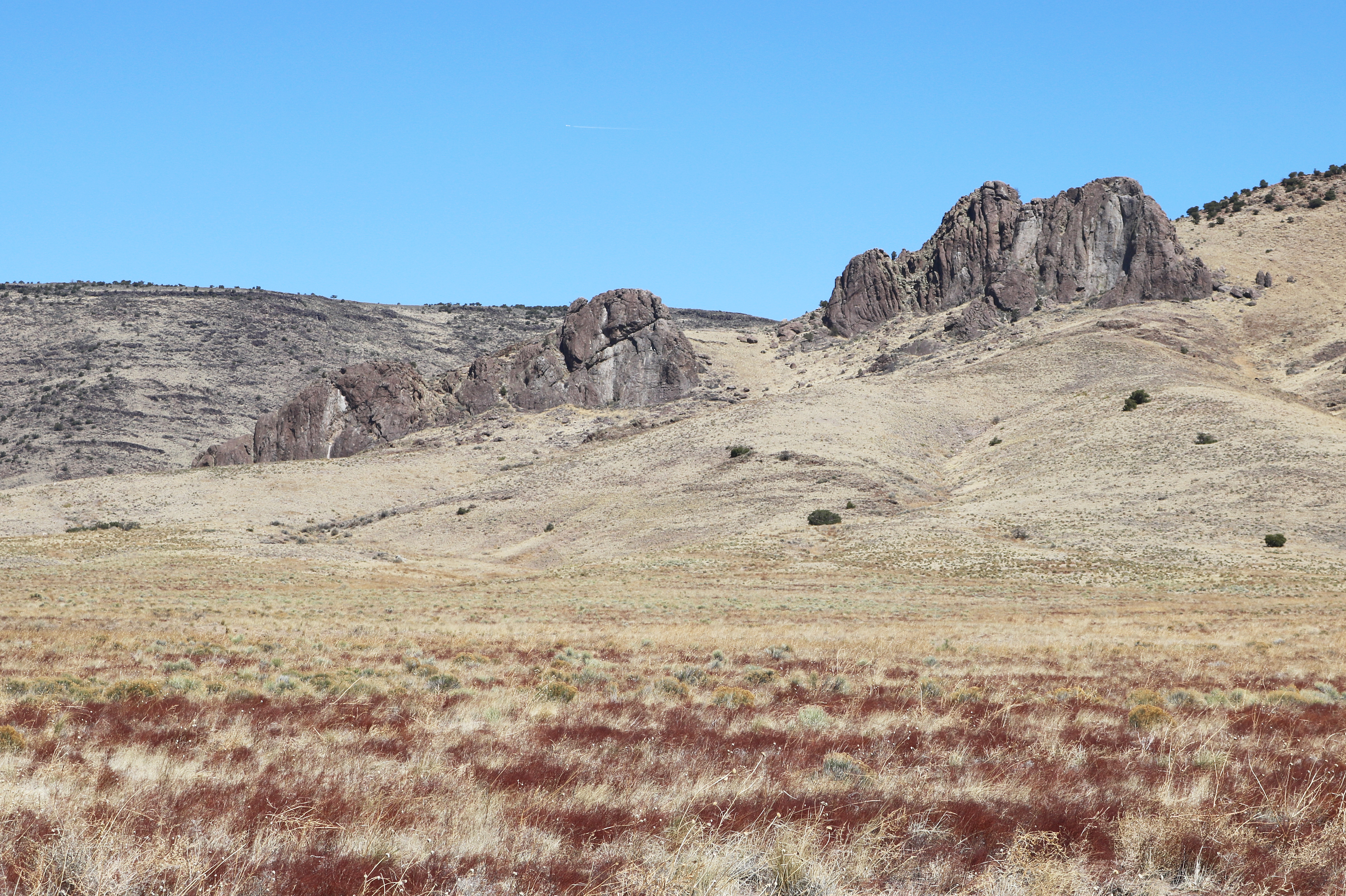
The Manassa Dike. Part of Flat Top is visible on the left.

The hills are the exposed parts of an intra-rift horst. They are capped by Miocene basalts of the Hinsdale Formation. The basalt is underlain by Oligocene andesite and dacite volcanic deposits of the lower Conejos Formation.

== Recreation ==
The public lands in the San Luis Hills are not developed for recreation. However, some informal hiking trails exist, and mountain climbing and bouldering are possible, especially around the Manassa Dike on south side of Flat Top.

== Protected areas ==
The San Luis Hills Wilderness Study Area occupies a 10,883-acre (4,404-hectare) tract of land in the Piñon Hills. The wilderness study area was established in 1980 and is owned by the Bureau of Land Management.

In 2016, the Western Rivers Conservancy got funding from the Conservation Alliance to purchase a 17,019-acre (6,887-hectare) tract in the Brownie Hills on both sides of the Rio Grande, some of it adjacent to or overlapping with the Rio Grande Natural Area. The plan is to transfer the land to Costilla County, which will manage it for wildlife habitat, agriculture, and public open space.
