= Colorado State Highway 142 =

State highway in Colorado, United States

State Highway 142
- Los Caminos Antiguos
- SH 142 highlighted in red

Route information
- Maintained by CDOT
- Length: 33.5 mi (53.9 km)

Major junctions
- West end: US 285 / SH 17 in Romeo
- East end: SH 159 in San Luis

Location
- Country: United States
- State: Colorado
- Counties: Conejos, Costilla

Highway system
- Colorado State Highway System; Interstate; US; State; Scenic
← SH 141	→ SH 144

State Highway 142 (SH 142) is a 33.5-mile (53.913 km) long state highway in southern Colorado. SH 142's western terminus is at U.S. Route 285 (US 285) near Romeo, and the eastern terminus is at SH 159 in San Luis.

== Route description ==
SH 142 begins in the west at its junction with US 285 mere feet outside the city limits of Romeo. The route heads east through the towns of Manassa and San Acacio before reaching its eastern terminus at San Luis where it meets SH 159.

The highway passes through the San Luis Hills and over the Rio Grande. The Manassa Dike is visible from the highway as it passes through the hills. Overall, the highway has very little traffic, especially the section that passes through the San Luis Hills. SH 142 connects the two river valleys (Conejos, Culebra Creek), passing through a high desert with little vegetation.

=== Scenic Byway ===
All of the highway is part of the Los Caminos Antiguos Scenic Byway

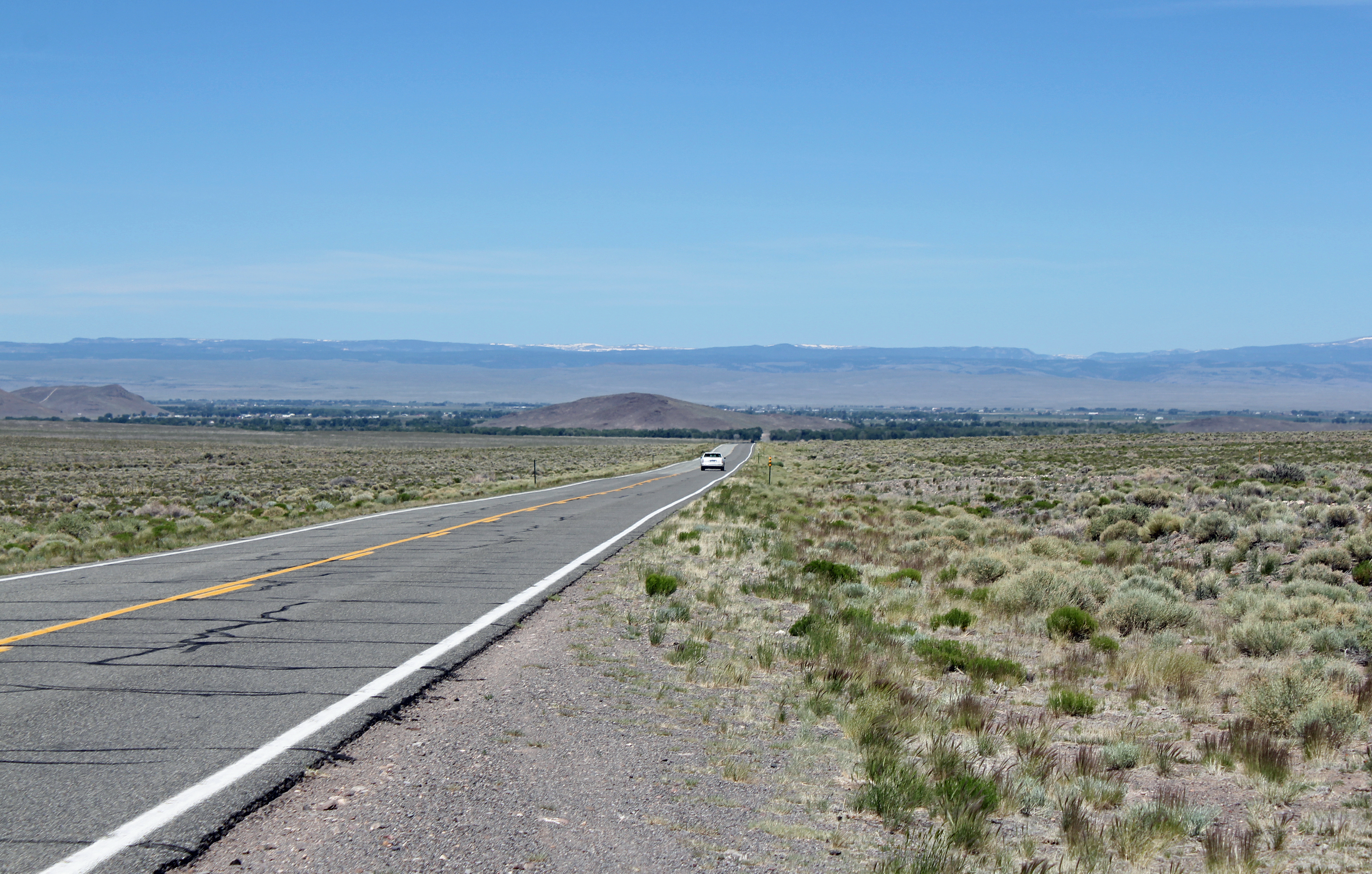
Looking west from the San Luis Hills.

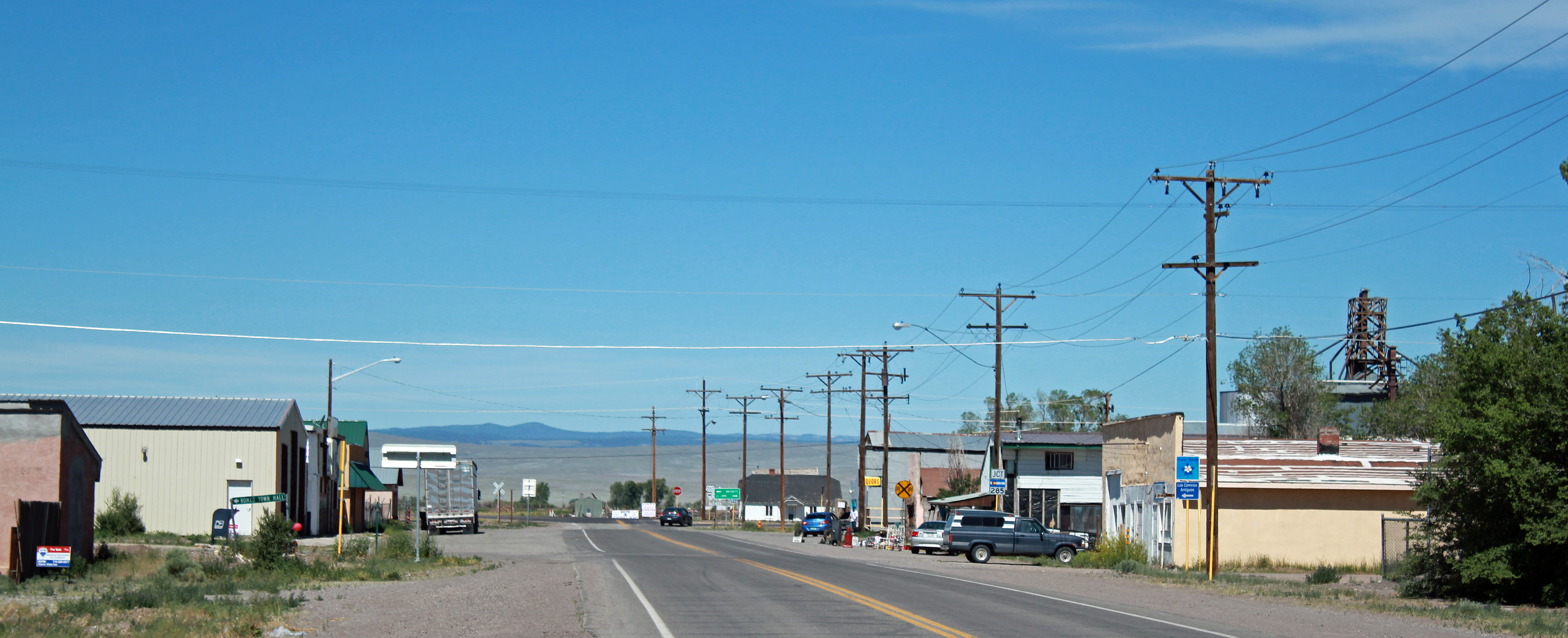
Romeo, Colorado, the western terminus of the highway.

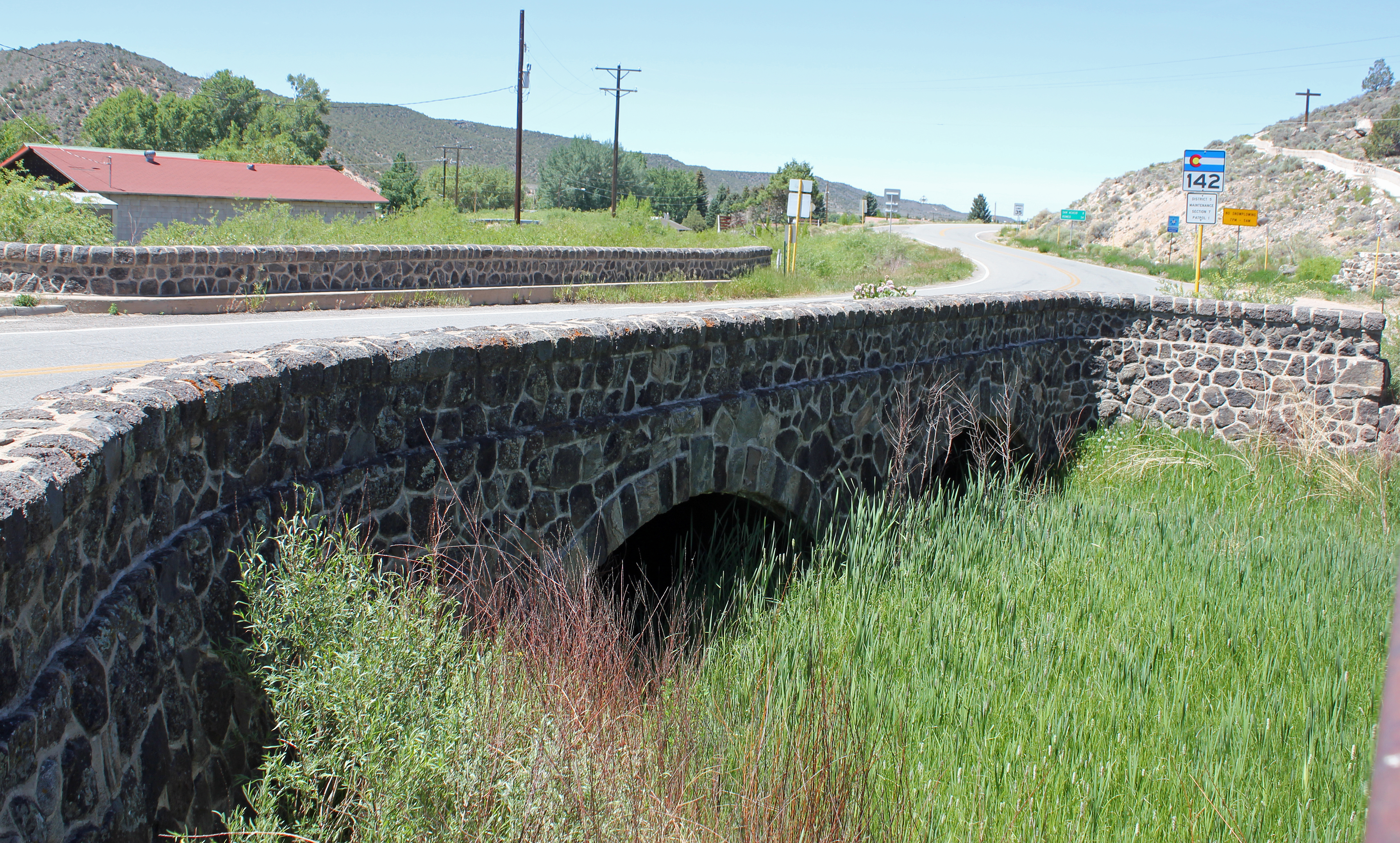
The eastern end of the highway in San Luis, Colorado.

== Major intersections ==
County	Location	mi	km	Destinations	Notes
Conejos	Romeo	0.00	0.00	US 285 (SH 17) – Antonito, La Jara	Western terminus
Rio Grande		14.3	23.0	Bridge	
Costilla	San Luis	33.5	53.9	SH 159	Eastern terminus
1.000 mi = 1.609 km; 1.000 km = 0.621 mi
