= Jaroso, Colorado =

Unincorporated community in Costilla County, CO, USA

- Unincorporated community
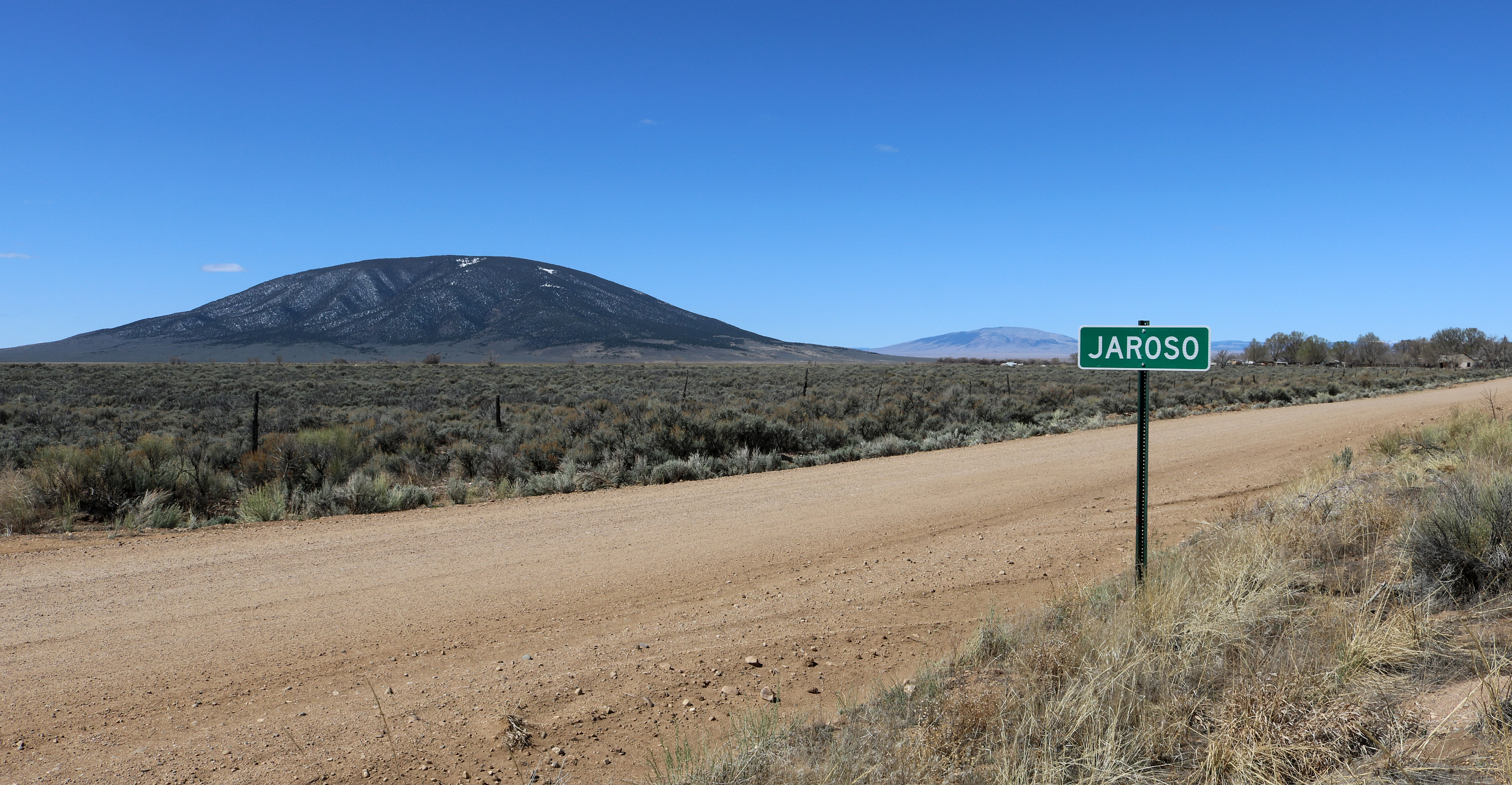
- Jaroso, with Ute Mountain on the left.

- Location within the state of Colorado
- Coordinates: 37°00′14″N 105°37′26″W
- Country: United States
- State: Colorado
- County: Costilla
- Elevation: 7,575 ft (2,309 m)
- Time zone: UTC-7 (MST)
  - Summer (DST): UTC-6 (MDT)
- ZIP code: 81138
- GNIS feature ID: 193115

Jaroso is an unincorporated community and a U.S. Post Office located in Costilla County, Colorado, United States. The Jaroso Post Office has the ZIP Code 81138.

A post office called Joroso has been in operation since 1911. Jaroso is a name derived from Spanish meaning "willows".
