= Garcia, Colorado =

Unincorporated community in Costilla County, CO, USA

- Unincorporated community
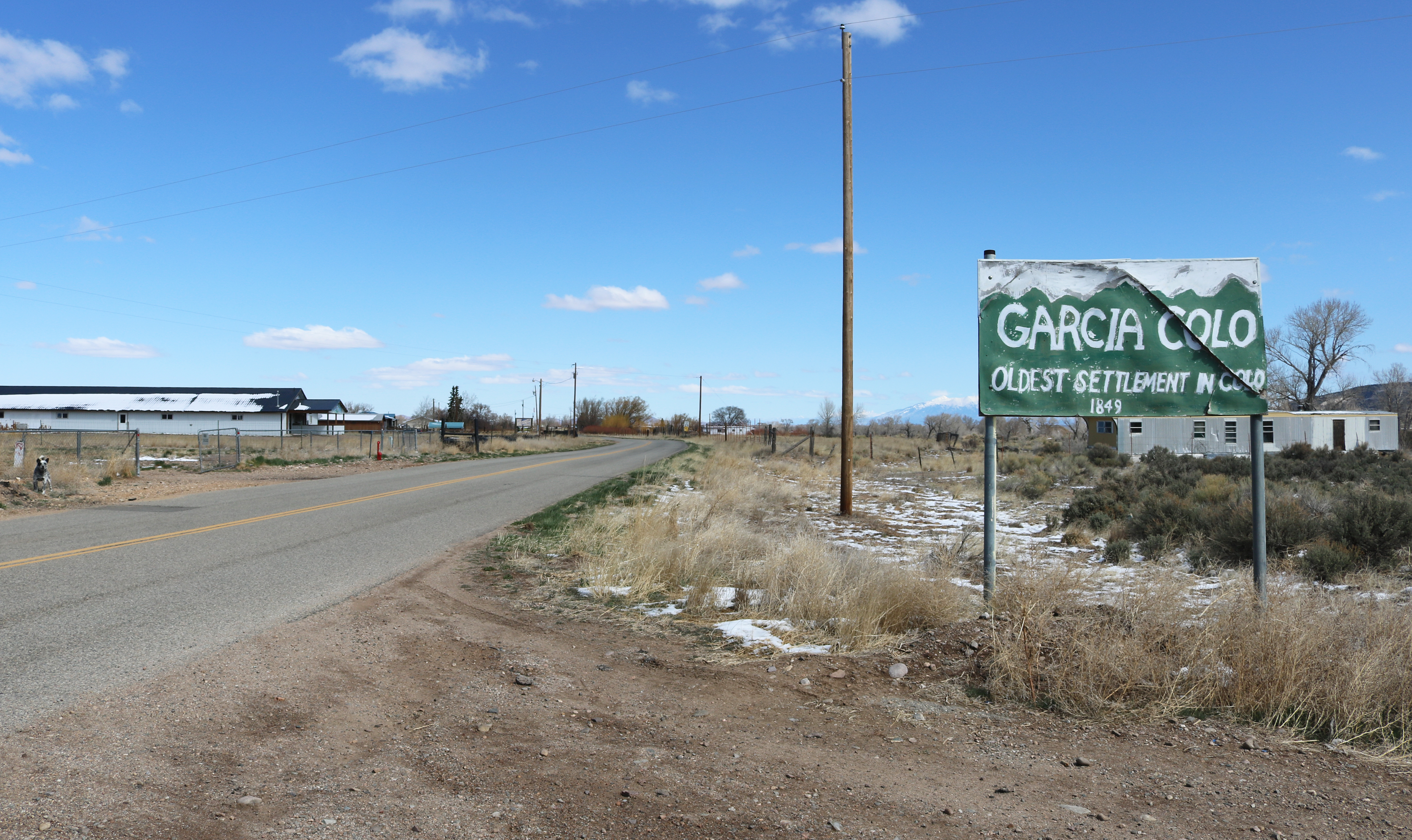
- Entering Garcia from New Mexico.
- Interactive map of Garcia, Colorado
- Coordinates: 37°00′15″N 105°32′14″W
- Country: United States
- State: Colorado
- Counties: Costilla
- Elevation: 7,730 ft (2,360 m)
- Time zone: UTC-7 (MST)
  - Summer (DST): UTC-6 (MDT)
- ZIP Code: 81152
- Area code: 719
- GNIS feature: 204793

Garcia is an unincorporated community located in Costilla County, Colorado, United States. The San Luis post office (Zip Code 81152) serves Garcia postal addresses.

== History ==
Originally settled in 1849 as La Plaza de los Manzanares, Garcia rivals San Luis as the oldest continuously occupied settlement in Colorado. A post office called Garcia was established in 1915. The community was named for the local Garcia family.

The historically significant, but long-unused, adobe Garcia School is being considered for renovation and return to school use by the Centennial School District.
