= Romeo, Colorado =

Town in Colorado, United States

Town of Romeo, Colorado
- Town
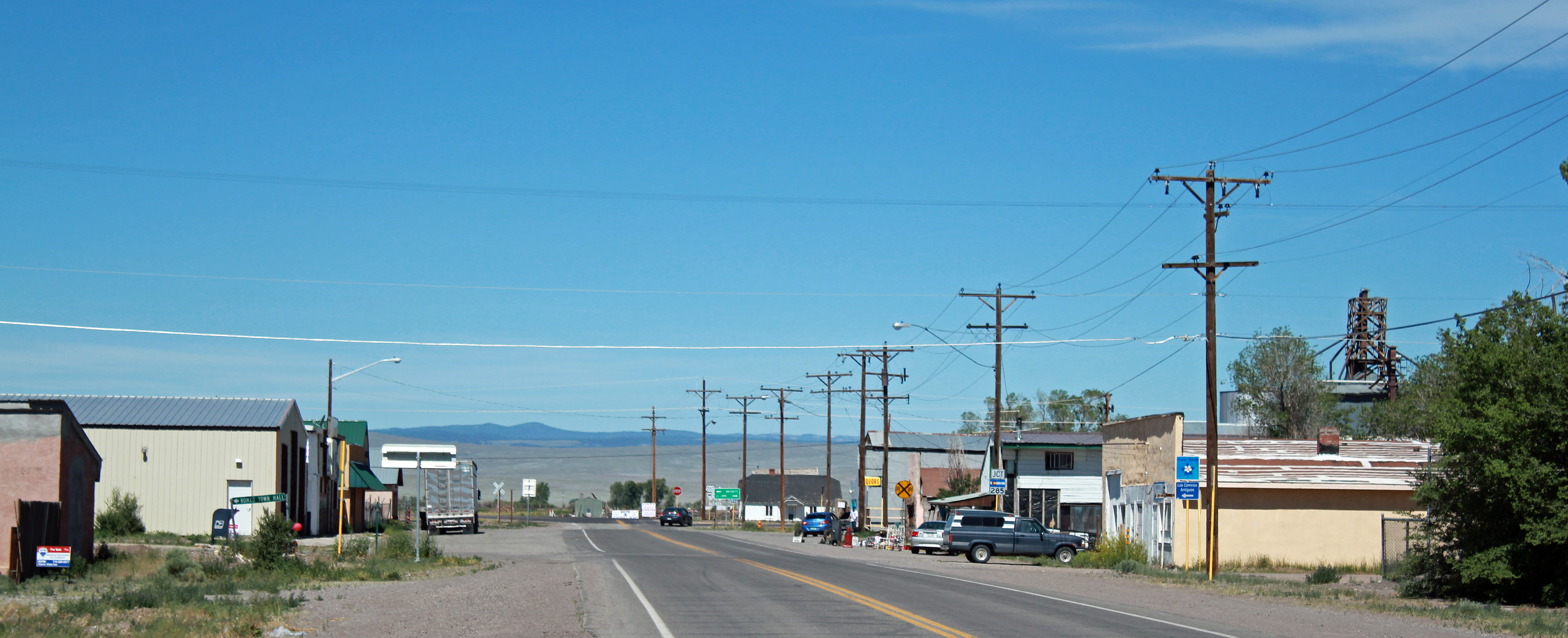
- Main Street, looking west

- Location of Romeo in Conejos County, Colorado.
- Coordinates: 37°10′19″N 105°59′07″W
- Country: United States
- State: Colorado
- County: Conejos County
- Incorporated (town): September 4, 1923

Government
  - Type: Statutory Town

Area
  - Total: 0.23 sq mi (0.60 km^{2})
  - Land: 0.23 sq mi (0.60 km^{2})
  - Water: 0 sq mi (0.00 km^{2})
- Elevation: 7,737 ft (2,358 m)

Population (2020)
  - Total: 302
  - Density: 1,300/sq mi (500/km^{2})
- Time zone: UTC-7 (Mountain (MST))
  - Summer (DST): UTC-6 (MDT)
- ZIP code: 81148
- Area code: 719
- FIPS code: 08-65740
- GNIS feature ID: 2412574

Romeo is a Statutory Town in Conejos County, Colorado, United States. The population was 302 at the 2020 census. A post office called Romeo was established in 1901. The community derives its name from the surname Romero.

== Geography ==
Romeo is located in east-central Conejos County in the San Luis Valley region. U.S. Route 285 runs along the western border of the town, leading north 21 miles (34 km) to Alamosa and south 12 miles (19 km) to the New Mexico border and beyond. Colorado State Highway 142 is the town's Main Street, with its western terminus at U.S. 285 and leading east 3 miles (5 km) to Manassa and 32 miles (51 km) to San Luis.

According to the United States Census Bureau, the town has a total area of 0.2 square miles (0.52 km^{2}), all of it land.

== Demographics ==
Historical population
Census	Pop.	Note	%±
1930	188		—
1940	392		108.5%
1950	404		3.1%
1960	339		−16.1%
1970	352		3.8%
1980	308		−12.5%
1990	341		10.7%
2000	375		10.0%
2010	404		7.7%
2020	302		−25.2%

== See also ==
- San Luis Valley
