= Costilla County, Colorado =

County in Colorado, United States

- County
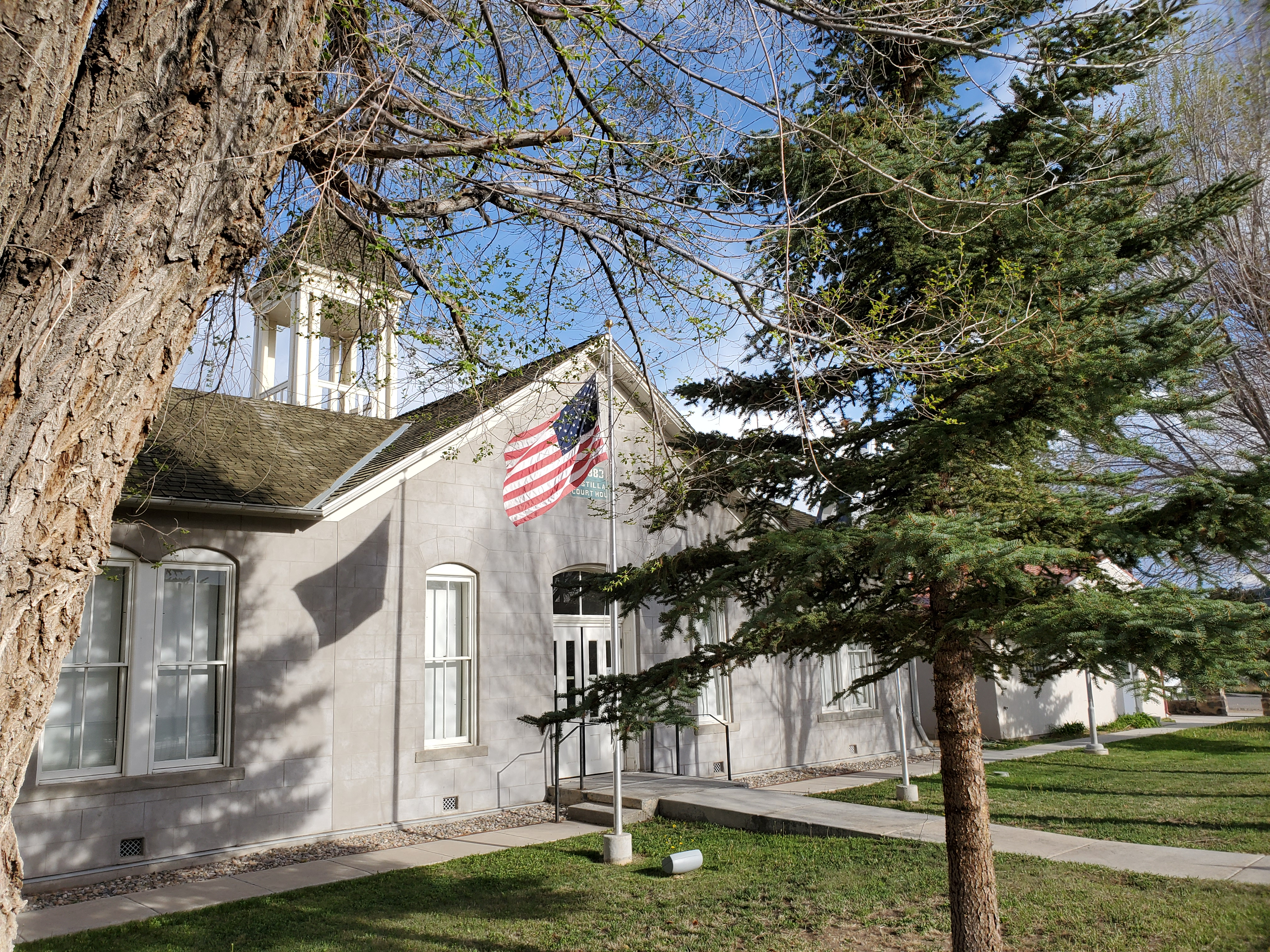
- The Costilla County Courthouse in San Luis

- Location within the U.S. state of Colorado
- Coordinates: 37.28°N 105.43°W
- Country: United States
- State: Colorado
- Founded: November 1, 1861
- Seat: San Luis
- Largest town: San Luis

Area
  - Total: 1,230 sq mi (3,200 km^{2})
  - Land: 1,227 sq mi (3,180 km^{2})
  - Water: 3.4 sq mi (8.8 km^{2}) 0.3%

Population (2020)
  - Total: 3,499
  - Estimate (2025): 3,679 ▲
  - Density: 2.852/sq mi (1.101/km^{2})
- Time zone: UTC−7 (Mountain)
  - Summer (DST): UTC−6 (MDT)
- Congressional district: 3rd
- Website: www.costillacounty.gov
- Colorado's first permanent settlement

Costilla County (Spanish for "rib") is a county located in the U.S. state of Colorado. As of the 2020 census, the population was 3,499. The county seat is San Luis, the oldest continuously occupied town in Colorado.

== History ==
On July 8, 1694, Spanish Conquistador Don Diego de Vargas and his army, two weeks before the Battle of Astialakwa, reached Costilla County. Diego Vargas is not the first Spaniard in Colorado. Juan de Archuleta led an expedition into Colorado in 1664 – his expedition is the first traceable Spanish expedition into Colorado. In 1647, Governor Luis Rosas fought with the Utes in northern New Mexico. While Rosa came near Colorado, it has not been verified he actually did.

Costilla County was the first area of Colorado to have been colonized. The county made up the major part of the Sangre de Cristo Land Grant awarded by the government of New Mexico to the Charles H. Beaubien family in 1843. Hispanic settlers from Taos, New Mexico, officially established San Luis on April 9, 1851. Costilla County was one of the original 17 counties created by the Territory of Colorado on November 1, 1861. The county was named for Costilla Creek. San Miguel was originally designated the county seat, but the county government was moved to San Luis in 1863. (In 1869, surveys placed San Miguel in the New Mexico Territory.)

The county's original boundaries extended over much of south-central Colorado. Much of the northern portion became part of Saguache County in 1866, and the western portions were folded into Hinsdale and Rio Grande counties in 1874. Costilla County arrived at its modern boundaries in 1913 when Alamosa County was created from its northwest portions.

== Geography ==
According to the U.S. Census Bureau, the county has a total area of 1,230 square miles (3,200 km^{2}), of which 1,227 square miles (3,180 km^{2}) is land and 304 square miles (790 km^{2}) (0.3%) is water.

=== Adjacent counties ===
- Huerfano County - northeast
- Las Animas County - east
- Colfax County, New Mexico - southeast
- Taos County, New Mexico - south
- Conejos County - west
- Alamosa County - northwest

=== Major highways ===
- U.S. Highway 160
- State Highway 142
- State Highway 159

=== National protected area ===
- San Isabel National Forest

=== Historic trails and sites ===
- Fort Garland State History Museum
- Los Caminos Antiguos Scenic and Historic Byway
- Old Spanish National Historic Trail

== Demographics ==
Historical population
Census	Pop.	Note	%±
1870	1,779		—
1880	2,879		61.8%
1890	3,491		21.3%
1900	4,632		32.7%
1910	5,498		18.7%
1920	5,032		−8.5%
1930	5,779		14.8%
1940	7,533		30.4%
1950	6,067		−19.5%
1960	4,219		−30.5%
1970	3,091		−26.7%
1980	3,071		−0.6%
1990	3,190		3.9%
2000	3,663		14.8%
2010	3,524		−3.8%
2020	3,499		−0.7%
2025 (est.)	3,679	▲	5.1%
U.S. Decennial Census; 1790-1960 1900-1990; 1990-2000 2010-2020

=== 2020 census ===
As of the 2020 census, the county had a population of 3,499. Of the residents, 17.7% were under the age of 18 and 27.9% were 65 years of age or older; the median age was 52.2 years. For every 100 females there were 109.1 males, and for every 100 females age 18 and over there were 107.1 males. 0.0% of residents lived in urban areas and 100.0% lived in rural areas.

Costilla County, Colorado – Racial and ethnic composition Note: the US Census treats Hispanic/Latino as an ethnic category. This table excludes Latinos from the racial categories and assigns them to a separate category. Hispanics/Latinos may be of any race.
Race / Ethnicity (NH = Non-Hispanic)	Pop 2000	Pop 2010	Pop 2020	% 2000	% 2010	% 2020
White alone (NH)	1,033	1,086	1,234	28.20%	30.82%	35.27%
Black or African American alone (NH)	21	6	33	0.57%	0.17%	0.94%
Native American or Alaska Native alone (NH)	39	29	34	1.06%	0.82%	0.97%
Asian alone (NH)	34	34	55	0.93%	0.96%	1.57%
Pacific Islander alone (NH)	1	0	0	0.03%	0.00%	0.00%
Other race alone (NH)	5	12	13	0.14%	0.34%	0.37%
Mixed race or Multiracial (NH)	54	30	142	1.47%	0.85%	4.06%
Hispanic or Latino (any race)	2,476	2,327	1,988	67.60%	66.03%	56.82%
Total	3,663	3,524	3,499	100.00%	100.00%	100.00%

The racial makeup of the county was 52.2% White, 1.1% Black or African American, 1.9% American Indian and Alaska Native, 1.6% Asian, 0.0% Native Hawaiian and Pacific Islander, 14.8% from some other race, and 28.4% from two or more races. Hispanic or Latino residents of any race comprised 56.8% of the population.

There were 1,594 households in the county, of which 23.7% had children under the age of 18 living with them and 25.2% had a female householder with no spouse or partner present. About 33.7% of all households were made up of individuals and 18.0% had someone living alone who was 65 years of age or older.

There were 2,423 housing units, of which 34.2% were vacant. Among occupied housing units, 77.5% were owner-occupied and 22.5% were renter-occupied. The homeowner vacancy rate was 2.5% and the rental vacancy rate was 8.3%.

=== 2000 census ===
As of the 2000 census, there were 3,663 people, 1,503 households, and 1,029 families living in the county. The population density was 3 people per square mile (1.2 people/km^{2}). There were 2,202 housing units at an average density of 2 per square mile (0.77/km^{2}). The racial makeup of the county was 60.91% White, 0.79% Black or African American, 2.48% Native American, 1.01% Asian, 0.14% Pacific Islander, 29.46% from other races, and 5.21% from two or more races. 67.59% of the population were Hispanic or Latino of any race.

There were 1,503 households, out of which 28.50% had children under the age of 18 living with them, 52.60% were married couples living together, 11.30% had a female householder with no husband present, and 31.50% were non-families. 28.10% of all households were made up of individuals, and 11.60% had someone living alone who was 65 years of age or older. The average household size was 2.44 and the average family size was 2.98.

In the county, the population was spread out, with 25.00% under the age of 18, 6.60% from 18 to 24, 23.30% from 25 to 44, 28.30% from 45 to 64, and 16.80% who were 65 years of age or older. The median age was 42 years. For every 100 females there were 99.80 males. For every 100 females age 18 and over, there were 96.20 males.

The median income for a household in the county was $19,531, and the median income for a family was $25,509, the lowest for Colorado. Males had a median income of $22,390 versus $16,121 for females. The per capita income for the county was $10,748. About 21.30% of families and 26.80% of the population were below the poverty line, including 32.40% of those under age 18 and 23.30% of those age 65 or over.

== Politics ==
Costilla County has a heavily Hispanic population and has long been a Democratic stronghold. The last Republican to carry the county was Calvin Coolidge in 1924, and the last to gain an absolute majority William Howard Taft in 1912 – an era when most votes in these high valley counties were done for the voters by political machines. In the last eleven Presidential elections the Democratic candidate has consistently received over sixty percent of the county's vote and four times won over seventy percent. In recent years, however, Republicans have gained ground in Costilla County and other areas of southern Colorado, with Republican candidate Donald Trump breaking 40% of the vote while holding Democratic candidate Kamala Harris below 60% of the vote, both for the first time since 1972. This was the strongest shift toward the Republican party out of all Colorado counties in this election, mirroring the trends seen in other majority-Hispanic counties in the rest of the country.

United States presidential election results for Costilla County, Colorado
Year	Republican		Democratic		Third party(ies)	
Year	No.	%	No.	%	No.	%
1880	334	46.84%	379	53.16%	0	0.00%
1884	498	50.71%	484	49.29%	0	0.00%
1888	507	56.46%	383	42.65%	8	0.89%
1892	526	63.45%	0	0.00%	303	36.55%
1896	96	3.85%	2,388	95.83%	8	0.32%
1900	884	65.43%	453	33.53%	14	1.04%
1904	917	63.46%	506	35.02%	22	1.52%
1908	1,051	64.60%	559	34.36%	17	1.04%
1912	1,072	55.06%	567	29.12%	308	15.82%
1916	579	34.65%	1,028	61.52%	64	3.83%
1920	778	49.52%	750	47.74%	43	2.74%
1924	755	48.37%	665	42.60%	141	9.03%
1928	657	37.33%	1,070	60.80%	33	1.88%
1932	707	31.92%	1,475	66.59%	33	1.49%
1936	930	37.14%	1,518	60.62%	56	2.24%
1940	1,121	39.40%	1,698	59.68%	26	0.91%
1944	896	37.09%	1,515	62.71%	5	0.21%
1948	921	36.37%	1,563	61.73%	48	1.90%
1952	1,070	43.73%	1,369	55.95%	8	0.33%
1956	958	42.50%	1,256	55.72%	40	1.77%
1960	637	31.83%	1,351	67.52%	13	0.65%
1964	299	18.82%	1,284	80.81%	6	0.38%
1968	477	32.19%	933	62.96%	72	4.86%
1972	602	42.16%	744	52.10%	82	5.74%
1976	392	26.96%	1,033	71.05%	29	1.99%
1980	489	30.89%	1,036	65.45%	58	3.66%
1984	621	38.07%	997	61.13%	13	0.80%
1988	454	28.72%	1,120	70.84%	7	0.44%
1992	366	20.88%	1,180	67.31%	207	11.81%
1996	333	20.29%	1,168	71.18%	140	8.53%
2000	504	30.58%	1,054	63.96%	90	5.46%
2004	566	32.16%	1,170	66.48%	24	1.36%
2008	415	24.45%	1,245	73.36%	37	2.18%
2012	446	24.28%	1,340	72.95%	51	2.78%
2016	588	31.82%	1,125	60.88%	135	7.31%
2020	741	35.39%	1,311	62.61%	42	2.01%
2024	850	40.87%	1,155	55.53%	75	3.61%

United States Senate election results for Costilla County, Colorado2
Year	Republican		Democratic		Third party(ies)	
Year	No.	%	No.	%	No.	%
2020	713	34.16%	1,313	62.91%	61	2.92%

United States Senate election results for Costilla County, Colorado3
Year	Republican		Democratic		Third party(ies)	
Year	No.	%	No.	%	No.	%
2022	518	30.72%	1,108	65.72%	60	3.56%

Colorado Gubernatorial election results for Costilla County
Year	Republican		Democratic		Third party(ies)	
Year	No.	%	No.	%	No.	%
2022	507	30.25%	1,120	66.83%	49	2.92%

In Colorado's first elections as a state in 1876, Auguste Lacome (D) ran against William H. Meyer (R) for State Senate in Costilla County, then Colorado's 18th District. Meyer would later become the Lt. Governor of Colorado. Votes cast for "Locome" and "Lacompte" were included in the count for Lacome. Meyer carried the election 349–204.

It is part of Colorado's 3rd congressional district, which has a Cook Partisan Voting Index of R+7 and is represented by Republican Jeff Hurd. In the Colorado Senate, it is in District 6 and is represented by Republican Cleave Simpson. In the Colorado House of Representatives, it is in District 62 and is represented by Democrat Matthew Martinez.

== Communities ==
=== Towns ===
- Blanca
- San Luis

=== Census-designated places ===
- Fort Garland
- San Acacio

=== Other unincorporated places ===
- Chama
- Garcia
- Jaroso
- Mesita
- Russell

== See also ==
- Bibliography of Colorado
- Geography of Colorado
- History of Colorado
  - Auguste Lacome
  - San Luis de la Culebra
  - San Miguel
  - National Register of Historic Places listings in Costilla County, Colorado
- Index of Colorado-related articles
- List of Colorado-related lists
  - List of counties in Colorado
- Outline of Colorado
