= San Luis, Colorado =

Town in Colorado, United States

San Luis, Colorado San Luis de la Culebra
- Statutory Town
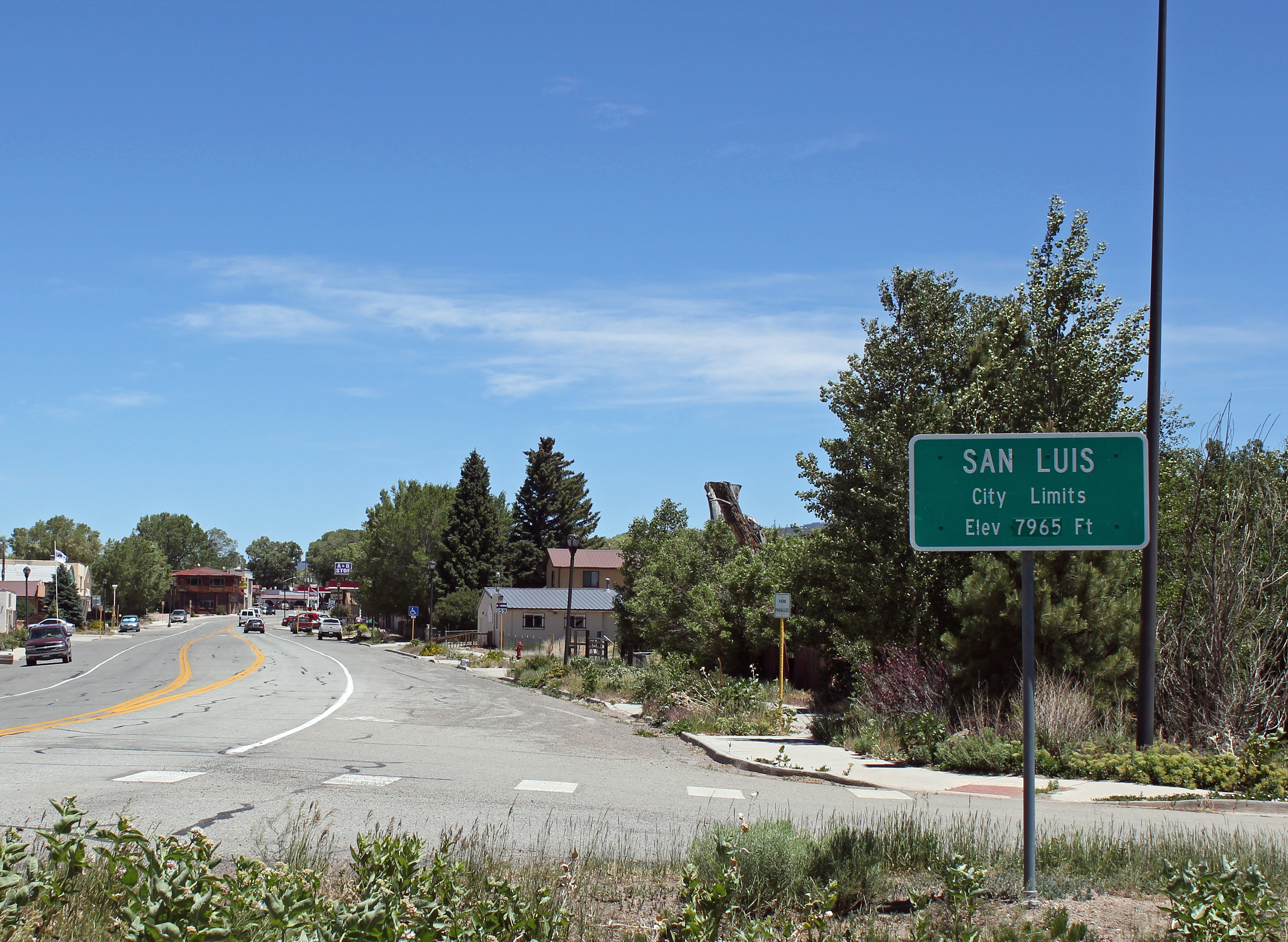
- Entering San Luis from the west
- Motto: The Oldest Town in Colorado
- Location of San Luis in Costilla County, Colorado.

- Location within Colorado Location within the United States
- Coordinates: 37°12′09″N 105°25′21″W
- Country: United States
- State: State of Colorado
- County: Costilla County – seat
- Established: April 9, 1851
- Incorporated: 1885

Government
  - Type: Statutory Town

Area
  - Total: 0.57 sq mi (1.47 km^{2})
  - Land: 0.57 sq mi (1.47 km^{2})
  - Water: 0 sq mi (0.00 km^{2})
- Elevation: 7,989 ft (2,435 m)

Population (2020)
  - Total: 598
  - Density: 1,050/sq mi (407/km^{2})
- Time zone: UTC-7 (MST)
  - Summer (DST): UTC-6 (MDT)
- ZIP code: 81152
- Area code: 719
- FIPS code: 08-68105
- GNIS feature ID: 2413253
- Website: townofsanluisco.org

San Luis is a statutory town that is the county seat of and the most populous town in Costilla County, Colorado, United States. Formerly known as San Luis de la Culebra, it is the oldest continuously occupied town in Colorado. The population was 598 at the 2020 census.

== History ==
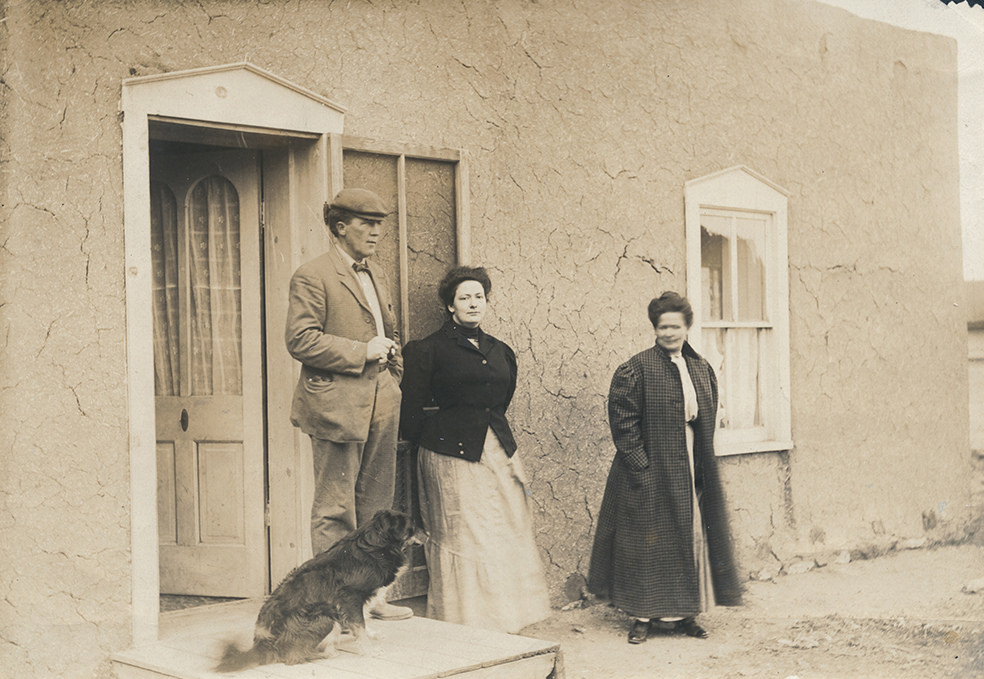
La casa del senor Don Alberto Forbes, San Luis, 1909

The Town of San Luis is centuries younger than the pueblos and villages of northern New Mexico because Hispanic settlers were wary of venturing north of the 37th parallel north for fear of Ute and Comanche raids. Armed traders traveled the Old Spanish Trail through the area in the early 19th century. In 1821, the Treaty of Córdoba recognized the independence of Mexico from the Spanish Empire. San Luis was in the Sangre de Cristo Land Grant awarded by the government of New Mexico to the Carlos Beaubien family in 1843. The Treaty of Guadalupe Hidalgo annexed northern Mexico to the United States in 1848, and the Compromise of 1850 created the U.S. Territory of New Mexico.

Hispanic settlers from the Taos Valley established several small villages along the Rio Culebra in the San Luis Valley and officially took possession of this portion of the Sangre de Cristo Land Grant on April 9, 1851. The settlers built a church in the central village of La Plaza Medio. They dedicated it on the Feast of Saint Louis, June 21, 1851, renaming the village San Luis de la Culebra in honor of the saint.

The United States Army established Fort Massachusetts in 1852 and Fort Garland in 1858 to provide protection for the settlers in the valley. The village of San Luis remained part of the Territory of New Mexico until 1861 when the Territory of Colorado was established. San Luis became the seat of Costilla County in 1863, and remains so to this day. Colonel Christopher "Kit" Carson, Commander of Fort Garland, negotiated a treaty with the Ute people in 1867. Colorado became a state in 1876 and the Town of San Luis was incorporated in 1885. Today, San Luis is the oldest continuously inhabited town in the State of Colorado.

A Pueblo Chieftain article dated June 8, 1872, describes the three stores of San Luis as kept by Fred Meyer & Co, Auguste Lacome and Mazers & Rich in addition to a blacksmith, butcher, beer saloon, carpenter and two hotels.

Today, the town is renowned for its Stations of the Cross ascending the 250-foot high local mesa. Visitors can ascend the hill using a half-mile trail and visit each of the stations, or drive to the top and park near a chapel located at the end of the trail. The town celebrates the Fiesta de Santiago y Santa Ana each July and the San Luis Manito Christmas celebration in December.

== Geography ==
The town of San Luis lies in the San Luis Valley. Colorado State Highway 159 leads north 15 miles (24 km) to Fort Garland and U.S. Route 160, and south 18 miles (29 km) to the New Mexico border. Highway 142 leads west 31 miles (50 km) to Manassa.

According to the United States Census Bureau, the town has a total area of 0.54 square miles (1.4 km^{2}), all of it land.

== Demographics ==
Historical population
Census	Pop.	Note	%±
1970	781		—
1980	842		7.8%
1990	800		−5.0%
2000	739		−7.6%
2010	629		−14.9%
2020	598		−4.9%
U.S. Decennial Census

== Notable people ==
- Huberto Maestas, sculptor
- Dario Gallegos, founder of R&R Market in 1857

== See also ==
- Old Spanish National Historic Trail
- Culebra Range
- Auguste Lacome
