= National Register of Historic Places listings in Costilla County, Colorado =

Location of Costilla County in Colorado

This is a list of the National Register of Historic Places listings in Costilla County, Colorado.

This is intended to be a complete list of the properties and districts on the National Register of Historic Places in Costilla County, Colorado, United States. The locations of National Register properties and districts for which the latitude and longitude coordinates are included below, may be seen in a map.

There are 14 properties and districts listed on the National Register in the county. Another property was once listed but has been removed.

This National Park Service list is complete through NPS recent listings posted August 1, 2025.

== Current listings ==
	Name on the Register	Image	Date listed	Location	City or town	Description
1	Capilla de San Isidro	Capilla de San Isidro	July 23, 2013 (#13000523)	21801 County Road K5; 37°08′05″N 105°22′49″W	Los Fuertes	
2	Capilla de Viejo San Acacio	Capilla de Viejo San Acacio	March 12, 2012 (#12000091)	14152 County Road 14.8; 37°12′06″N 105°30′31″W	Viejo San Acacio	Culebra River Villages of Costilla County Multiple Property Submission
3	Chama Sociedad Proteccion Mutua de Trabajadores Unidos (SPMDTU) Lodge Hall	Chama Sociedad Proteccion Mutua de Trabajadores Unidos (SPMDTU) Lodge Hall	December 31, 2018 (#100003273)	SW corner of County Rd. L7 (Whiskey Pass Rd.) and County Road 223; 37°09′45″N 105°22′31″W	Chama	Culebra River Villages of Costilla County Multiple Property Submission
4	Fort Garland	Fort Garland	February 26, 1970 (#70000156)	On State Highway 159, 1 block south of U.S. Highway 160; 37°25′18″N 105°25′50″W	Fort Garland	
5	Iglesia de la Inmaculada Concepcion	Iglesia de la Inmaculada Concepcion	March 12, 2012 (#12000089)	21529 County Road P.6; 37°09′48″N 105°22′55″W	Chama	Culebra River Villages of Costilla County Multiple Property Submission
6	Iglesia de San Francisco de Assisi	Iglesia de San Francisco de Assisi	March 27, 2012 (#12000144)	23531 County Road J.2; 37°06′09″N 105°20′57″W	San Francisco	Culebra River Villages of Costilla County Multiple Property Submission
7	Iglesia de San Pedro y San Pablo	Iglesia de San Pedro y San Pablo	March 12, 2012 (#12000090)	11423 County Road 21; 37°09′41″N 105°24′07″W	San Pedro	Culebra River Villages of Costilla County Multiple Property Submission
8	Las Feminilas Concilio #6	Las Feminilas Concilio #6	April 2, 2025 (#100011601)	Address Restricted; 37°06′06″N 105°20′49″W	San Francisco	
9	Plaza de San Luis de la Culebra	Plaza de San Luis de la Culebra	December 22, 1978 (#78000837)	State Highway 159; 37°11′14″N 105°25′25″W	San Luis	
10	Rito Seco Creek Culvert	Rito Seco Creek Culvert	October 15, 2002 (#02001146)	State Highway 142 at milepost 33.81; 37°12′00″N 105°25′34″W	San Luis	
11	A. A. Salazar House	A. A. Salazar House	January 23, 1998 (#97001281)	603 Main St. 37°12′08″N 105°25′31″W	San Luis	
12	San Luis Bridge	San Luis Bridge	February 4, 1985 (#85000195)	Off State Highway 159; 37°11′37″N 105°25′49″W	San Luis	
13	San Luis Southern Railway Trestle	San Luis Southern Railway Trestle	January 6, 2004 (#03001361)	An abandoned section of Costilla County Road 12; 37°23′12″N 105°32′51″W	Blanca	
14	"Sierras y Colores" Mural		August 3, 2023 (#100009205)	318 Main St. 37°11′57″N 105°25′34″W	San Luis	

== Former listing ==
	Name on the Register	Image	Date listed	Date removed	Location	City or town	Description
1	Smith-Gallego House		April 14, 1975 (#7500504)	February 27, 1995	Main St.	San Luis	Demolished in June 1982

== See also ==
- List of National Historic Landmarks in Colorado
- List of National Register of Historic Places in Colorado
- Bibliography of Colorado
- Geography of Colorado
- History of Colorado
- Index of Colorado-related articles
- List of Colorado-related lists
- Outline of Colorado
