= Shirley Romero Otero =

Chicana activist in Colorado (born 1955)

- Born: 1955 (age 70–71); San Pablo, Colorado
- Occupations: Public educator and organizer
- Organization: Land Rights Council

Shirley Romero Otero (born 1955) is a Chicana activist who co-founded the Land Rights Council in 1977 to regain the rights for heirs of the Sangre de Cristo Land Grant. She is an educator and leader in the San Luis Valley region. She is the director of the Move Mountains Youth Project, Inc.

== Biography ==
Shirley Romero was born in 1955 in San Pablo, Colorado. Her parents were Moises and Esmeralda Olivas Romero, and she had four siblings. She traces her ancestry back to Mexican settlers from the mid-1800s, with Spanish and Jicarilla Apache ancestry.

Romero Otero taught for over 28 years in Grand Junction and San Luis. She taught Ethnic Studies, and coordinated with the La Raza Youth Leadership Conference. She is the leader of the Colorado Statewide Parent Coalition and a member of the Latino Advisory Committee for the Colorado Commission on Higher Education.

Her work with Move Mountains Youth Project is intended to reconnect local youth with the land where their ancestors farmed and "reawaken that cultural memory."

=== La Sierra Land Rights ===
The Sangre de Cristo Land Grant, over 1 million acres of land in the San Luis Valley of southern Colorado, was awarded by the New Mexican government to the Beaubien family in 1843. Under Spanish and Mexican law, the original grant set aside common land for use by the entire community. In 1848, the area was incorporated into the United States with the Treaty of Guadalupe Hidalgo. In 1864, Beaubien's wife sold the grant area to Colorado Territorial Governor William Gilpin. The sale document obligated Gilpin and his partners to respect the settlers' property and communal rights. In 1868, Gilpin divided the grant area into two ranches: the Trinchera Estate in the north and the Costilla Estate in the South. Gilpin and subsequent owners sold pieces of the grant area to private investors.

For nearly 100 years, the descendants of the Hispanic settlers continued to have communal rights to the use of much of the land although the legal ownership of the land passed through various hands. The Hispanic descendants generally held title to the lands they used for irrigated agriculture, but exerted their rights to access larger properties, usually owned by Anglos, for grazing, timber, and other uses. In 1960, that situation changed when a North Carolina lumberman named John T. (Jack) Taylor purchased 77 thousand acres (310 km^{2}) of the former Costilla Estate which became known as the Taylor Ranch. The deed provided that the local people had the right for pasture, wood, and lumber on Taylor's land. In 1963, however, Taylor began to fence the ranch, cutting off the access of the nearby residents. Protests followed with some violence.

The conflict between Taylor and the residents was dubbed the "Costilla County Range War" by the press. Taylor filed suit on the "inferior Mexicans" who "trespassed" on "his" mountain, with the U.S. District Court in Denver, J.T. Taylor vs. Pablita Jacquez, et al.

In 1977, Romero Otero co-founded the Land Rights Council (LRC) in Chama, Colorado, and was elected president. The LRC formed to reestablish traditional "usufructory rights" and allow local people to access the land.

In 1981, LRC filed a class-action lawsuit, Rael v. Taylor, for the 109 plaintiffs on behalf of over 1000 heirs. Litigation lasted for over 21 years before 2002, when the Colorado Supreme Court found the case in the LRC's favor. In November 2018, the Colorado Court of Appeals permanently reaffirmed the rights of Chicano and Mexican descendants to use the land in La Sierra.

However, the LRC's work is not finished. They continue legal battles with the current owner, William Harrison, who purchased the Cielo Vista Ranch in 2018 for $105 million. Despite three Supreme Court affirmations, San Luis residents are still being restricted from using the land.

=== Personal life ===
Romero Otero is the mother of four children, and has two grandchildren.

== Recognition ==
In 2018, Romero Otero received a Lifetime Achievement award from the state of New Mexico for her leadership in the Land Grant struggle.

In 2021, she was honored with the César Chávez Latino Leadership Hall of Fame Award from the Denver Public Library.

In 2022, she was honored as a Corn Mother.

== See also ==
- Chicano Movement
- Hispanics and Latinos in Colorado
- Indigenous land rights
- Indigenous peoples of the North American Southwest
- Sangre de Cristo Mountains
- Treaty of Guadalupe Hidalgo
