= Cambois =

Village in Northumberland, England

Coordinates: 55.145°N 1.521°W

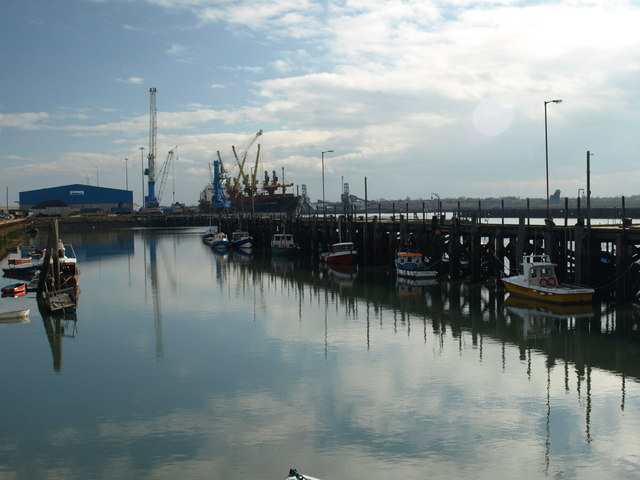
- Cambois Fishing Fleet

- Location within Northumberland
- OS grid reference: NZ305835
- Unitary authority: Northumberland
- Ceremonial county: Northumberland
- Region: North East
- Country: England
- Sovereign state: United Kingdom
- Post town: BLYTH
- Postcode district: NE24
- Dialling code: 01670
- Police: Northumbria
- Fire: Northumberland
- Ambulance: North East
- UK Parliament: Wansbeck

Cambois (/ˈkæməs/ KAM-əs) is a village in south-east Northumberland, England. It is situated on the north side of the estuary of the River Blyth between Blyth and Ashington on the North Sea coast.

== Etymology ==
According to earlier scholarship, the etymon of the name is probably Gaelic cambas "bay, creek". However, the name could equally be from the Cumbric cognate of cambas, *camas "bend in a river, bay", which would fit with Cambois's location at the confluence of the Sleek Burn and the River Blyth. In either case, the spelling seems to have been influenced by French bois "wood".

== History ==
Cambois was a township in Bedlingtonshire which, until 1844, was part of County Durham. It was a coal mining village from 1862 to week ending 20 April 1968 when Cambois Colliery closed.

Cambois is now closely related to the area known as North Blyth. The main commercial activity was the importation of alumina for the manufacture of aluminium at Lynemouth, but that smelter has now closed. Alumina is still imported and moved by rail to a smelter powered by the Lochaber hydroelectric scheme, near Fort William on the west coast of Scotland.

In 1883, the Coal Company gave a list of the property it owned, or leased:

North Blyth Staithes	7 houses
Mr Moore, colliery Manager	1 house
Mood & Scott	2 houses
Stable Cottage	1 house
Schoolmaster's House (at Boca Chica)	1 house
Sea View	12 houses
Quality Row	18 houses
Sinker's Row	20 houses
Chapel Row	20 houses
Mawburn Terrace	30 houses
Gee's Houses	30 houses
Watergate	29 houses
Cowgate	26 houses
Bridge Street	40 houses
Boca Chica	46 houses
Boat House Terrace	46 houses
Mr Freeman	5 houses
New Cottages	18 houses
Store Row	
Institute Row	3 houses

== The Tute ==
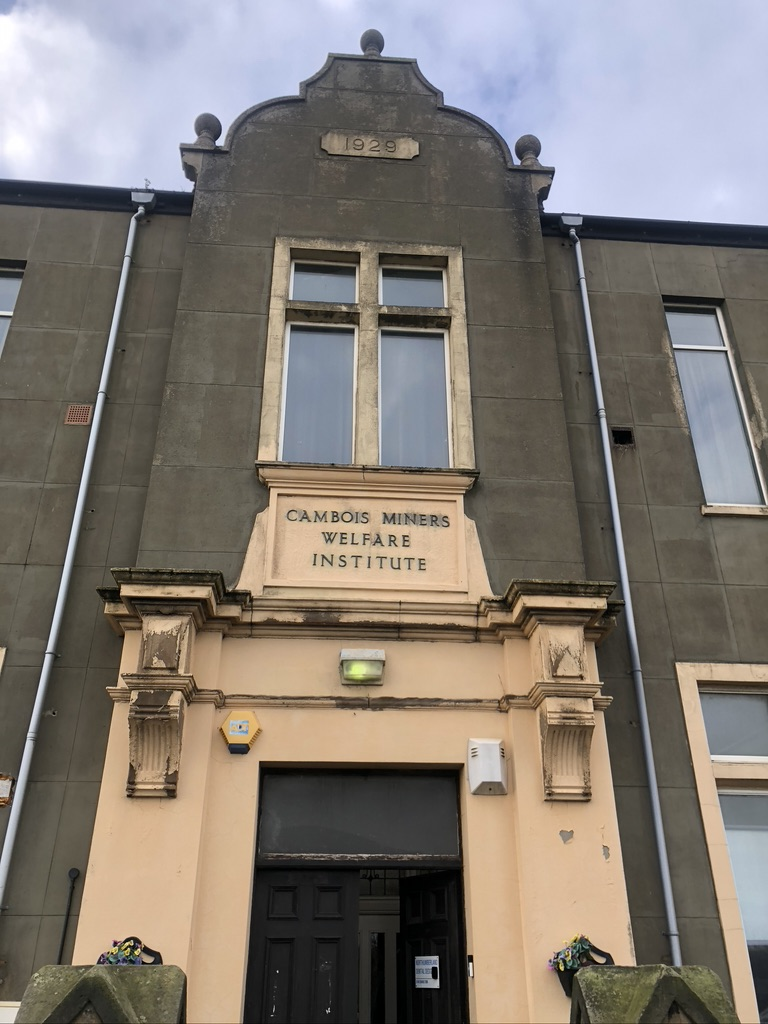
The Tute

Before the closure of the colliery, the social centre of the village was the Miners Welfare Institute in Ridley Terrace. The present building, the fourth, dates from 1929, and was built following the destruction of an earlier institute in a fire. It had "a large billiards room, a library and news room, committee room, a 200 seater meeting room....There was a smoke room and lecture hall also, and films were also shown here."

In 2023, the building, which had been unused for more than a decade, was reopened as an arts centre and community hub, The Tute, by the choreographer Esther Huss and her partner, the writer Alex Oates. The Guardian reported, "As well as Huss making her own work here, she runs a dance group, and Oates runs a writing group, shivering through the winter with no heating and scraping together funding to keep everything free."

The Tute hosts an annual Rude Health festival, launched in 2024, which offers a feast of "daring and anarchic performance" from "world class artists". Alex Oates told the Northumberland Gazette, "Our audience deserve the same calibre of work you’d see in London or Edinburgh, and we’re bringing it here! This season brings together bold new performances, reimagined community projects, and unforgettable stories told through dance, theatre, film, and celebration.”

== Proposed gigafactory, then data centre ==
In December 2020, Cambois was confirmed as the location for a new Britishvolt battery manufacturing plant. In July 2021, plans for the £2.6bn gigafactory employing 3,000 people were approved, with the new plant to be located on former coalyards adjacent to the now-demolished power station in Cambois. It would produce lithium-ion batteries for the automotive industry. Britishvolt appointed ISG as its construction partner who began work on clearing the site in late 2021. In January 2022, the UK government, through its Automotive Transformation Fund, invested £100m in the Britishvolt project, alongside asset management company abrdn and its property investment arm Tritax, developing what was planned to be Britain's fourth largest building. However, construction work was halted in August 2022 amid funding concerns, with manufacturing planned to start in mid-2025, more than a year later than initially planned. On 17 January 2023, Britishvolt went into administration, and its factory site was put up for sale.

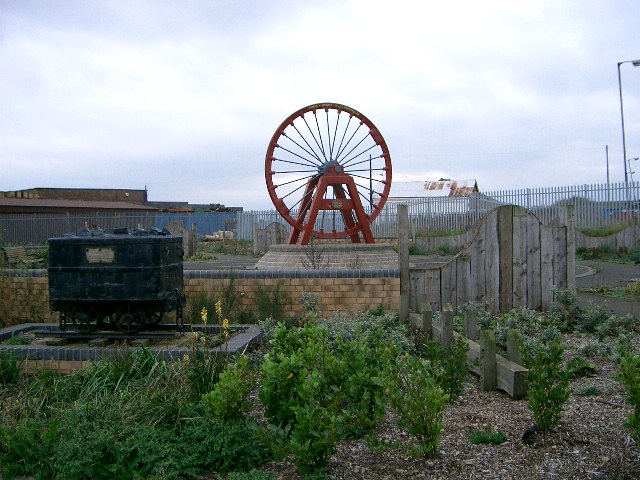
Winding wheel from the Old Cambois Colliery

Some 15 months later, the site was acquired for construction of a data centre, ending hopes for thousands of manufacturing jobs in the region. However, plans submitted in December 2024 envisaged development of up to 10 data centre buildings totalling up to 540,000sq m, representing an investment of up to £10bn, with 1,200 long-term construction jobs plus employment in the data centres.
