= San Luis Bridge =

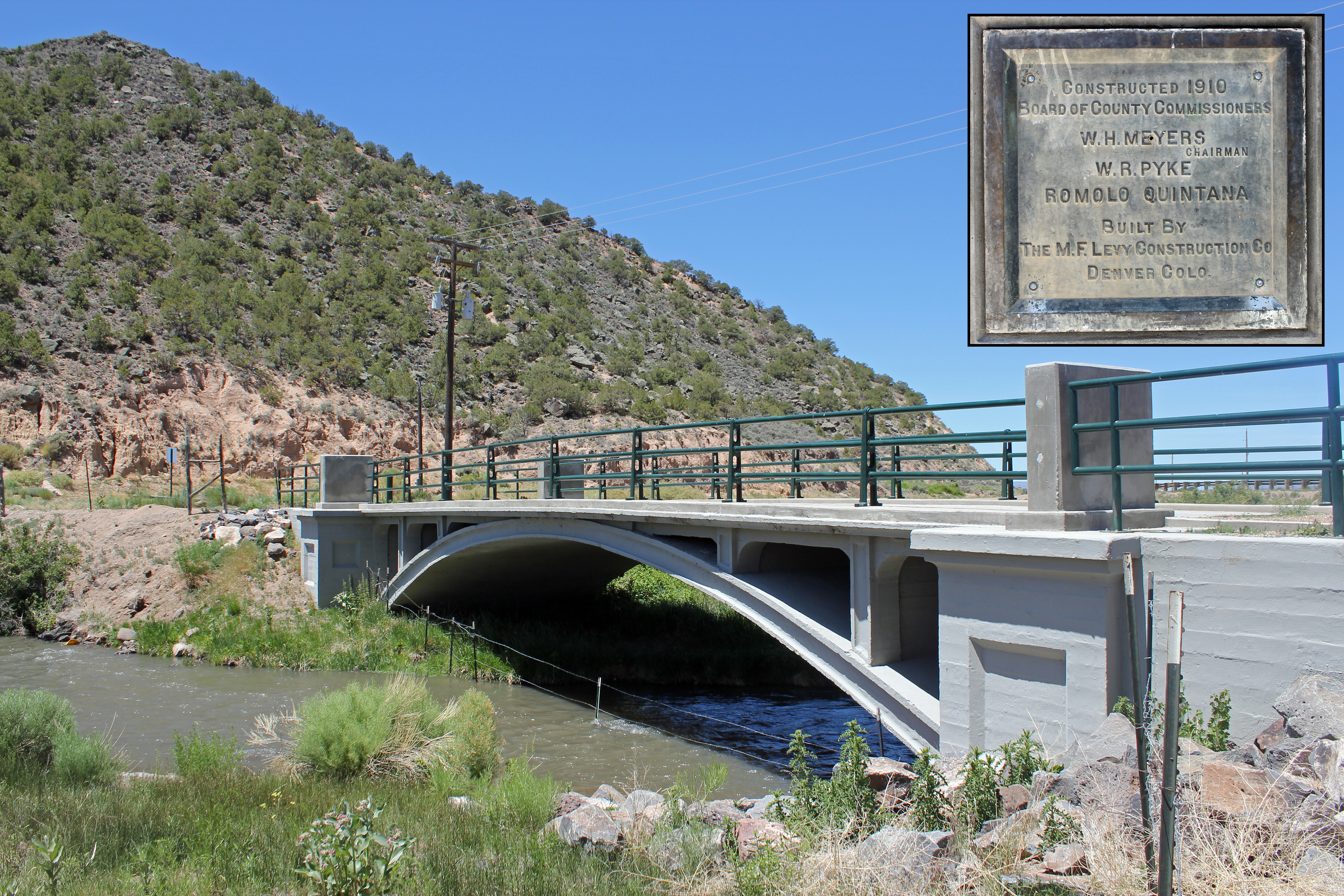
- Bridge in 2012; plaque is inset at top-right
- Coordinates: 37°11′37″N 105°25′49″W
- Locale: Off SH 159, San Luis, Colorado

Characteristics
- Design: Open Spandrel Arch
- Total length: 62 feet 6 inches (19.05 m)
- Width: 14 feet 1 inch (4.29 m) (roadway)
- Longest span: 57 feet (17 m)

History
- Architect: State Engineer of Colorado
- Constructed by: Levy, M. F., Construction Co.
- Construction start: February 22, 1911
- Construction end: May 1911
- Construction cost: $4,860.35
- San Luis Bridge
- U.S. National Register of Historic Places
- Colorado State Register of Historic Properties
- Location within Colorado Location within the United States
- Coordinates: 37°11′37″N 105°25′49″W
- Area: 0.1 acres (0.040 ha)
- MPS: Vehicular Bridges in Colorado TR
- NRHP reference No.: 85000195
- CSRHP No.: 5CT.141
- Added to NRHP: February 4, 1985

Location
- Interactive map of San Luis Bridge

The San Luis Bridge, also known as State Bridge or Bridge over Culebra Creek, is a historic open spandrel arch bridge that crosses Culebra Creek in San Luis, Colorado. It was built in 1911 as a road bridge, but now serves pedestrian traffic. It is listed on the National Register of Historic Places.

== History ==
In 1909, the Colorado Legislature appropriated $2,000 for a highway bridge over Culebra Creek near San Luis. The bridge was designed by the State Engineer, and the work was advertised in the Rocky Mountain News. Bids were received on August 20, 1910, from Missouri Valley Bridge and Iron Company, Midland Bridge Company, Cuno Engineering and Construction Company, and M.F. Levy Construction Company. M.F. Levy bid lowest at $4700 and was awarded the contract. The difference was funded by an appropriation from the Board of County Commissioners of Costilla County.

Because of high water in the creek, abutment excavation was delayed until February 22, 1911. Construction was finished in May 1911; Costilla county paid $2,860.35. The bridge originally carried State Highway 15, but by the 1980s it carried a county road.

The bridge was listed on the National Register of Historic Places on February 4, 1985.

In 2007, the State Historical Fund granted $150,300 to the county to restore the bridge for pedestrian and bicycle use.

== Design and significance ==
The bridge has a single, 57-foot-long (17 m) span made of reinforced concrete. It has an open spandrel arch design, a style uncommonly used in the Rocky Mountains. The San Luis Bridge is significant as one of the few State Bridges extant in Colorado, and one of the oldest and least modified open arch bridges in the state. The bridge deck is a 5 inches (0.13 m) concrete slab, supported on the arch by six concrete columns. The guardrails are made of steel pipe.

== See also ==
- National Register of Historic Places listings in Costilla County, Colorado
- List of bridges on the National Register of Historic Places in Colorado
- List of Colorado Department of Highways bridges on the National Register of Historic Places
