= Wansbeck Greyhound Track =

Sports venue in the Cambois, England

- Location: Cambois, Northumberland
- Coordinates: 55°09′15″N 1°31′37″W
- Closed: 2012

Wansbeck Greyhound Track was a greyhound racing track in Cambois, Northumberland.

The track was constructed on the East coast of England on the north side of the estuary of the River Blyth between Blyth and Ashington on the North Sea coast.

The Cambois colliery used to be on the site before it was closed in 1968. The track had race distances of 247, 412 and 587 metres and closed and re-opened several times since its opening.

Today it is only used as a rearing and schooling track having last held races in 2012.
