= Rito Seco =

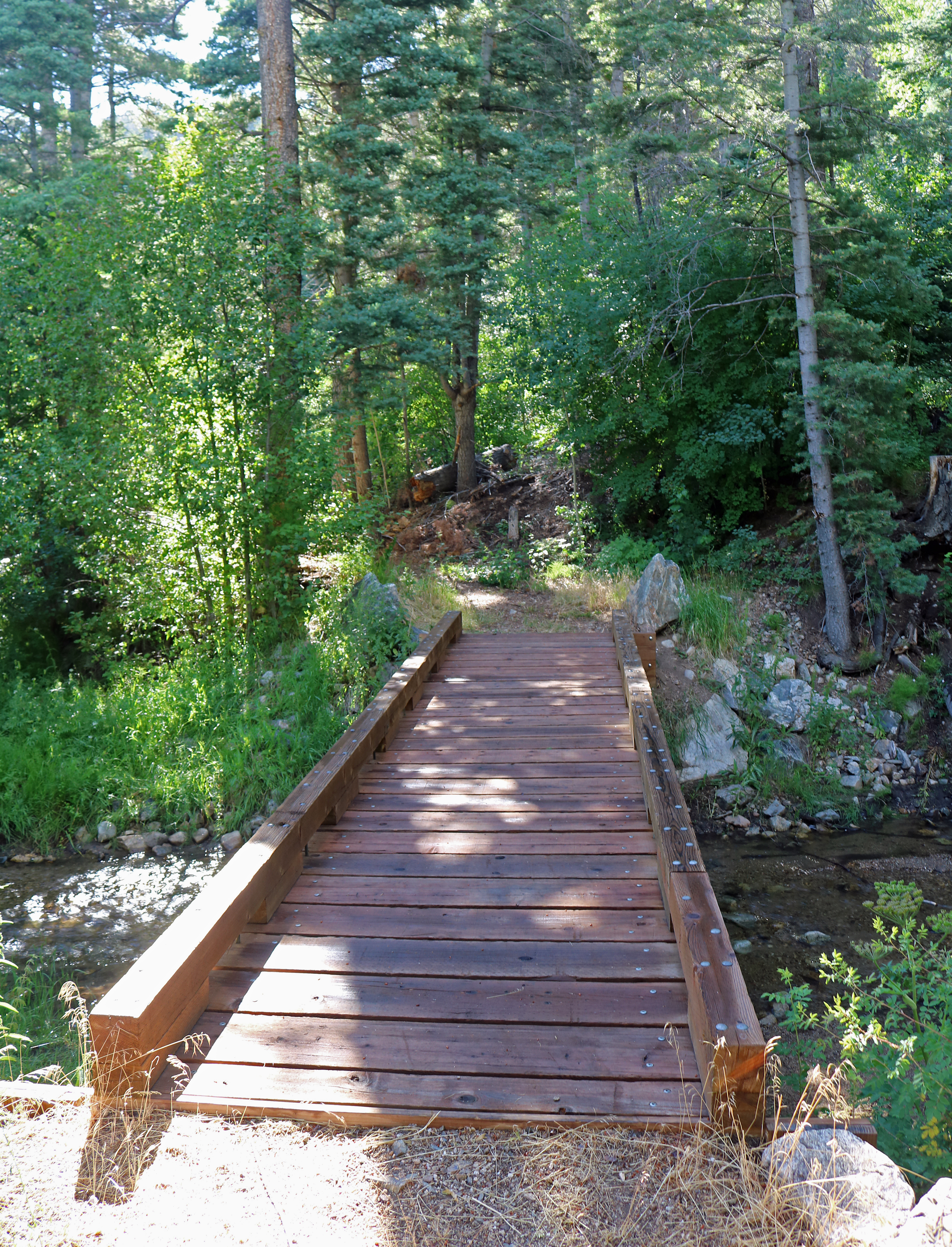
- A hiking trail bridge over the creek in Rito Seco Park

- Location of the creek's mouth in Colorado

Location
- Country: United States
- State: Colorado
- County: Costilla County

Physical characteristics
- Source
  - location: Culebra Range
  - coordinates: 37°16′36.05″N 105°14′29.05″W
- Mouth: Confluence with Culebra Creek
  - location: San Luis, Colorado
  - coordinates: 37°12′14.05″N 105°25′1.04″W
  - elevation: 8,002 feet (2,439 meters)
- Discharge
  - location: Culebra Creek

Basin features
- Progression: Culebra Creek — Rio Grande

Rito Seco is a tributary of Culebra Creek in Costilla County, Colorado. The name means dry creek in the dialect of Spanish spoken in southern Colorado and New Mexico.

== Course ==
The creek rises northeast of San Luis, Colorado in the Culebra Range, a subrange of the Sangre de Cristo Mountains. It flows through Rito Seco Park then flows southwest along Rito Seco Road in an arc towards San Luis. In San Luis, its flow reduced by ditch diversions, Rito Seco goes under Main Street (Colorado State Highway 159) and through the Rito Seco Creek Culvert, which carries the creek under Colorado State Highway 142. From here it continues south a few blocks to its mouth at Culebra Creek.

== Rito Seco Park ==
The creek gives its name to Rito Seco Park, a high mountain park and camping area, elevation about 10,000 feet (3,000 meters), in the Culebra Range. Although the camping area was first opened in the 1970s, it lacked hiking trails. Over a period of twelve years ending in 2022, Costilla County and an organization called San Luis Valley Great Outdoors worked to get grants to construct trails in the park. The four trails include several newly built wooden bridges over Rito Seco, and one of the trails is a single track mountain bike trail. The park is important because almost all of Costilla County is private land, and there is no government-owned open space, apart from the park.

== Rito Seco Creek Culvert ==
Built in 1936, the Works Project Administration-built Rito Seco Creek Culvert is essentially a bridge that carries Colorado State Highway 142 over the creek. Made of volcanic stone, the structure is listed on the National Register of Historic Places.

== See also ==
- List of rivers of Colorado
