= Green factory =

Factory using environmentally sustainable practices

A green factory, zero impact factory or green plant is an industrial manufacturing facility designed to minimize its environmental impact and recover resources. Green factories focus on energy efficiency, waste reduction, and the use of renewable energy sources to promote ecological responsibility. Many of these green factories gain their certification of minimal environmental impact through BREEAM.

Green factories are operational currently mostly in the European Union in the automotive industry. Automotive manufacturers such as Porsche and Volkswagen have envisions to construct green factories, and BMW has already constructed the BMW Green Plant in Leipzig, Germany. In the United States, companies are also creating green factories, such as Panasonic, whose green electric battery manufacturing factories in De Soto, Kansas will be run on mostly wind and solar power. In Japan, all 10 of the main production sites of Konica Minolta are certified green factories.

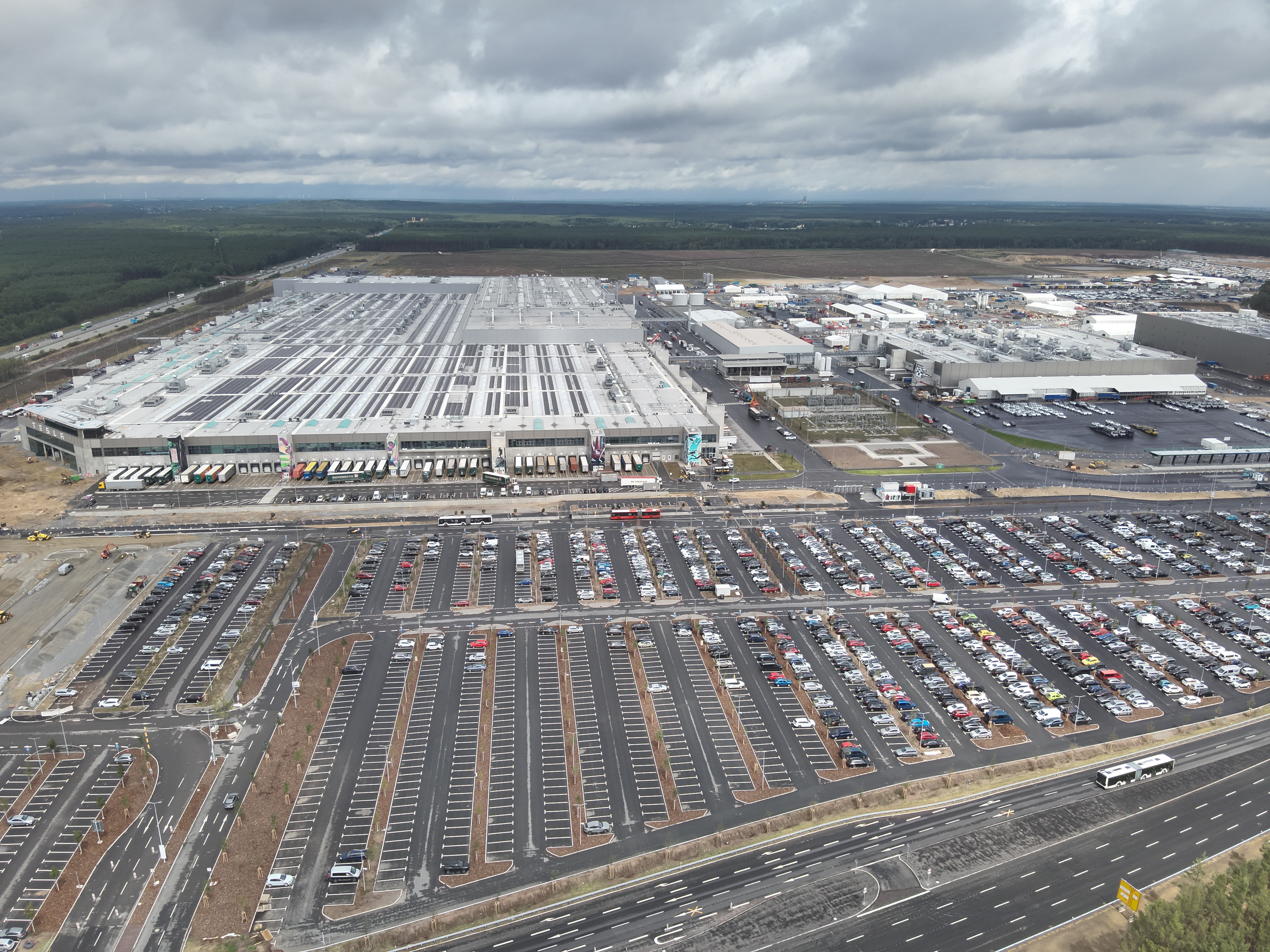
Tesla's Gigafactory Berlin-Brandenburg in Germany.

== See also ==
- Gigafactory
