= Mission Discovery =

- Genre: Educational Programme
- Locations: United Kingdom, Singapore, India, Australia, United States
- Years active: 2011–present
- Founder: Chris Barber
- Most recent: 11 July 2022
- Organiser: ISSET
- Sponsors: NASA, King's College London, University of Oxford, esa, aws, intel, Mastercard, Google, University of the West of Scotland, Jacobs, Twitter, Page Personnel, Rolls-Royce, Stamford American International School, Bernicia, Reece Group Ltd, The University of Melbourne, Pint of Science, Honeywell, Britishvolt, Glasgow Prestwick Spaceport, Minerva Tutors, XMA
- Website: www.isset.space

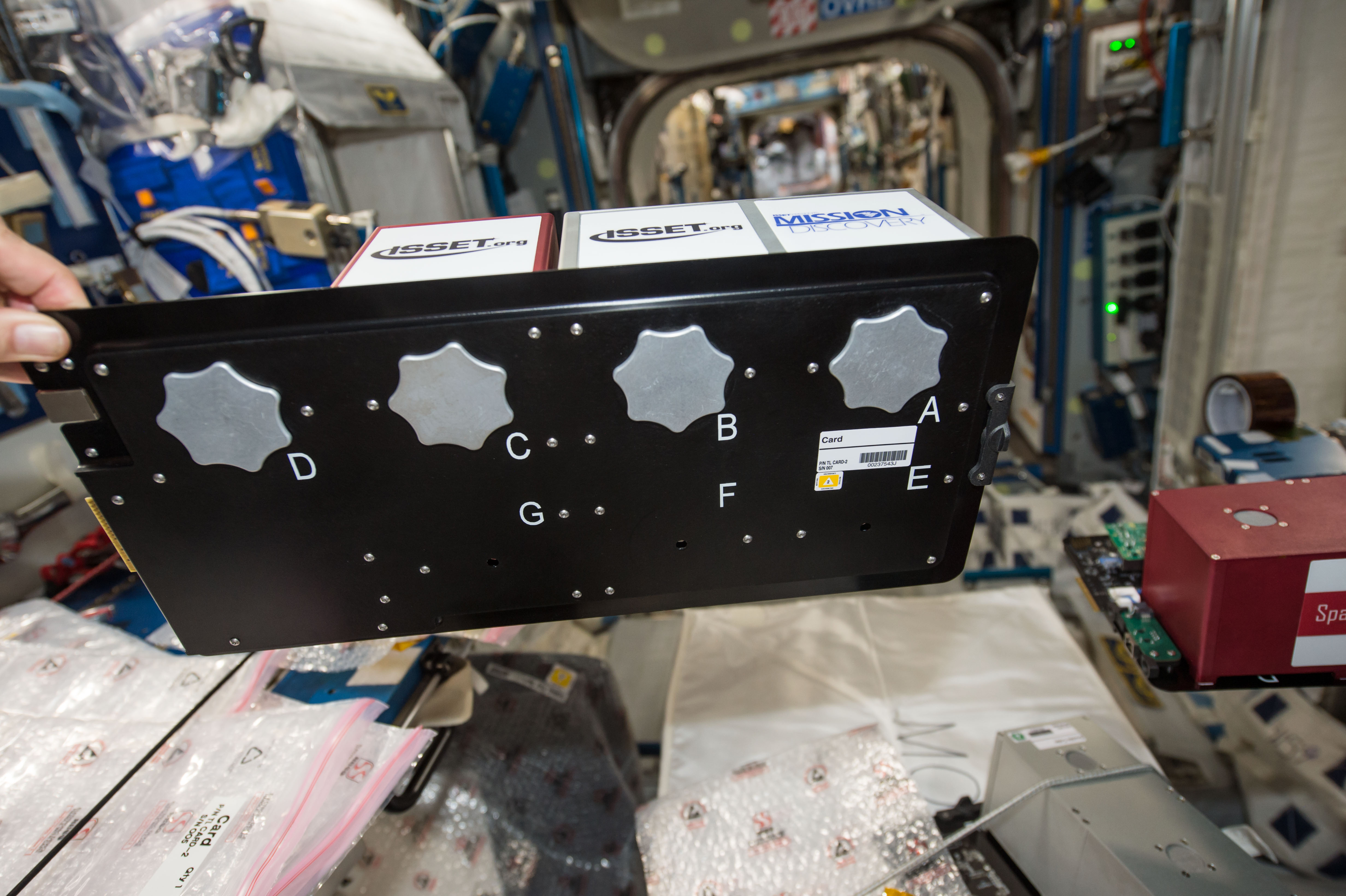
An ISSET-made experiment module inside the International Space Station

Mission Discovery is an international education program run for teenagers in many countries around the world. The programme started in 2011 in King's College London, England, and has since expanded to Australia, the US, India and other countries.

Mission discovery is run and directed by ISSET (International Space School Educational Trust), a registered UK charity founded in 1998 by Chris Barber. So far there have been 15 successful programs: one in India, twelve in the UK and two in the US. Each program has given the students the chance to work with space scientists while they work as a team designing experiments. As part of this program, at least one experiment designed by the students is sent to, and carried out on, the International Space Station.

== Format ==
Mission Discovery is a week-long event in which the pupils are split into random groups to design an experiment that could be launched into space. During this week the teams are involved in exercises designed to develop their leadership, team building, and personal development skills, while also giving them an insight into scientific fields with a relation to space. The pupils will also hear talks from various astronauts, scientists and people from fields outside of science, covering topics including biomedical and scientific research done by NASA, and the astronaut's experiences in space, as well as topics like public speaking and how to suitably present information. Towards the end of the week, the program is more focused on the design of the students' experiments. The students are given time to design an experiment they believe could work in space and are then tasked with presenting it in both, an informative and interesting way. On the final day, the pupils present their ideas to other colleagues and mentors as well as different scientists, doctors, and professors from universities. The winning idea has their experiment designed and sent to the International Space Station where astronauts there will carry out experiments.

So far there have been twenty different winning experiments. Each is then further designed with help from researchers and scientists. After a lengthy process of designing the experiment, the winning team is invited to watch the rocket launch carrying their experiment to the International Space Station. These experiments are then carried out by the current astronauts on board the ISS. Depending on the complexity and the issues with the experiments, they normally take up three years to be launched and carried out on board the ISS.

== Previous programmes ==
Year	Location	Winning team	Winning Experiment(s)
2012	King's College London, UK	-	To test the effectiveness of antibiotics on E. coli in space
2012	King's College London, UK	-	An experiment to examine if slime mold grows in three dimensions in space
2013	King's College London, UK	-	An experiment to study Daphnia magna in space
2013	King's College London, UK	-	An experiment to examine the effect of plant steroids on plant growth in microgravity
2014	Valparaiso University, USA	-	Examining the 3D applications of electrowetting in microgravity
2014	Embry–Riddle Aeronautical University, USA	-	Effects of microgravity on Luciferase activity
2014	Renfrewshire, UK	-	Treatment of conjunctivitis in space
2014	Renfrewshire, UK	-	Carbon dioxide consumption by cacti in microgravity
2014	King's College London, UK	-	An experiment to determine the impact of microgravity on symptoms of Alzheimer's disease
2014	King's College London, UK	-	An experiment to compare the rate of Amyloid beta protein aggregation on earth vs in a microgravity environment
2015	Caerphilly, UK	Suns of Ananke	An experiment to determine if probiotic bacteria is the best antiseptic for use in space
2015	King's College London, UK	Icarus	An experiment to see if electricity generating bacteria will increase either the rate or amount of electricity generated in a microgravity environment, compared with the same process on Earth
2015	Merthyr Tydfil, UK	Propulsion	An experiment looking to see whether symbiotic relationships between plants and bacteria are maintained in a microgravity environment
2015	Renfrewshire, UK	-	An experiment testing the impact of bacterial phages on different types of bacteria
2015	Cranfield University, UK	Positive Charge	An experiment testing whether ionic liquids are effective lubricants in microgravity
2016	Delhi, India	-	Producing food in space by using cellulase bacteria to convert cellose into glucose
2016	King's College London, UK	The G.R.E.A.T. A.C.	An experiment assessing the ability of the bacterium Chondromyces crocatus to form ‘fruiting bodies’ in microgravity
2016	Ayrshire, UK	Space Cadets	An experiment looking at whether the surface type of a material affects the speed slime mould travels in micro gravity
2016	Renfrewshire, UK	Defying Gravity	An experiment looking at how crops could be grown in space
2017	Gurgaon, India	SPACE MONKEY MAFIA	Speeding up the process of germination in space
2017	King's College London, UK	The Kepler 16b	Testing electric fields as a method of transporting polar liquids
2017	Ayrshire, UK	Space Raiders	The effect of microgravity on the electricity produced by phytoplankton through photosynthesis
2017	Renfrewshire, UK	EQUILIBRIUM	Investigating whether Aloe Vera gel is effective at stopping the growth of fungi in space
2017	Rhondda Valley, UK	-	Usefulness of heat, mixing, straws and pipetting in separating immiscible liquids neatly into their separate components on the International Space Station
2018	Hyderabad Public School, India	Refractive Minds	An experiment on the effects of gravity on the qualitative nutritional value of carbohydrates, broken down by the enzyme salivary amylase, in food
2018	King's College London, UK	Apol10	Measuring the rate of cell division in space using GFP
2018	King's College London, UK	TITAN pHive	Planarian Flatworm Regeneration in Microgravity
2018	University of Melbourne, Australia	Star Sailors	The effectiveness of antibacterials produced by flies on E. Coli in microgravity
2018	University of the West of Scotland, UK	Orbit	Vitamin C deterioration in space
2018	Ajmer, India	Orion	Looking at wax worms and their consumption of plastic in the hope to find a more efficient way to dispose of plastic on the International Space Station
2018	Aravali, India	NOZK2AS	The effectiveness of natural antibacterials in inhibiting the growth of Escherichia Coli (E.coli) DH5-Alpha in microgravity
2018	Ayrshire, Scotland	Lunartics	The effect of Phospholipase a2 (venom) on Staphylococcus Aureus in microgravity
2019	SAIS, Singapore	Covalent	Investigating Urease activity in microgravity
2019	Curtin University, Australia	Mission Force 28	Sending earthworms to the ISS to test whether they can keep soil stable in a micro-gravity environment
2019	King's College London, UK	Chimera	investigating the effects of micro-gravity on the biomass and PHA production of Haloarchaea
2019	University of the West of Scotland, UK	Interstellar Intellectuals	Determining whether increasing root pressure in microgravity would improve the effectiveness of plant growth
2019	Tonbridge School, UK	The Argonauts	Determining whether yeast is able to undergo sexual reproduction in a microgravity environment
2021	Newcastle, UK	Mission Waterfall	Exploring Biofilm - Biofilms on bacteria will degrade at an increased rate in microgravity than on earth
2021	King's College London, UK	Nebula 21	To determine the effect of microgravity and varying pressure on the efficiency of a ferrofluid energy harvester
2022	Singapore	A*SSET-12	To determine if zero gravity affects the epigenetics of Dictyostelium discoideum, specifically whether the individual amoeba cells are able to come together to form a multicellular slug when resources are depleted, as they do on Earth
2022	King's College London	TBD	TBD

== People involved ==
Scientists involved in the program have included:

=== Astronauts ===
- Michael Foale

Space time : ~ 374 days in space

Area of study : Astrophysicist

Mission discoveries attended: 2014 - 2016 King’s College London, England, 2016 Renfrewshire, Scotland, 2016 Ayrshire, Scotland

- Steven Swanson

Space time : ~ 196 days in space

Area of study : Engineer

Mission discoveries attended: 2016 Shiv Nadar School, India

- Scott Kelly

Space time : ~ 570 days in space

- Kenneth Ham

Space time : ~ 25 days in space

Area of study : Test pilot

Mission discoveries attended: 2012 - 2014 King’s College London, England, 2014 Renfrewshire, Scotland, 2014 Valparaiso University

- Stephen G. Bowen

Space time : ~ 40 days in space

Area of study : Engineer

Mission discoveries attended: 2015 Renfrewshire, Scotland, UK

- Jean-Jacques Favier

Space time : ~ 16 days in space

- Nicole Stott

Space time : ~ 106 days in space

Area of study : Engineer

Mission discoveries attended: 2014 Embry Riddle Aeronautical University, US

- Yi So-Yeon

Space Time : ~ 10 days in space

Area of study : Naval aviator, Test pilot, Engineer

- Michael J. McCulley

Space time : ~ 4 days in space

Area of study : Researcher

- Jerry L. Ross

Space time : ~ 58 days in space

Area of study : Flight Engineer

- Ken Bowersox

Space Time : ~ 211 days in space

Area of study : Test pilot

'Mission discoveries attended: 2015 Caerphilly, Wales

=== Nasa personnel ===
- Sarah Murray, Assistant chief of EVA, Robotics and Crew Systems
- Jay F. Honeycutt, former director of Kennedy Space Center

=== Scientists ===
- Dr. Julie Keeble, Pharmacology, King's College London
- Prof. Steve Harridge, Human and Applied Physiology, King's College London
- Dr. James Clarke, Human and Applied Physiology, King's College London
- Dr. David Green, Human and Aerospace Physiology, King's College London

== Completion ==
A picture of one of the winning teams with an astronaut

On completion of the program, the winning team then has to wait and go through the process of their experiment idea being built from only their design. This is a process which involves the team working with a scientist who helps them make their experiment suitable for the space station, because what the students choose, meaning the specifics, isn't always the best way for it to be done.

An example of this process in the team which won the program in Renfrewshire in 2014. For this group, the process of their ideas becoming the real thing lasted two years. This is because the experiment wasn't launched until the summer of 2016. During these two years, the team met up on a few occasions for events as well as experiment discussion sessions. The main experiment discussion session was held in 2014 when the team met with pharmacology lecturer from King's College London, Julie Keeble, who was the main scientist involved in the development of their experiment. This session took place at the University of the West of Scotland, where they spend time in the labs finding out how their experiment would be built and any changes that would need to be made to it. During the period between the first meeting and the launch, the students were also invited to an event which involved astronaut Mike Foale. The students took part in the day which involved meeting with Foale and listening to the talk he gave to the prospectus students for the 2015 program. These two above events were the main two events the students were involved in before their launch in the summer of 2016.

This example is similar to most programs run by ISSET.

== See also ==
- Australian Space Agency
