= Edward Vigil =

American politician

Member of the Colorado House of Representatives from the 62nd district
- In office January 7, 2009 – January 11, 2017
- Preceded by: Rafael Gallegos
- Succeeded by: Donald Valdez

Personal details
- Born: San Pablo, Colorado, U.S.
- Party: Democratic
- Spouse: Evelyn
- Education: Adams State University (BA)

Edward Vigil is an American politician who served in the Colorado House of Representatives from the 62nd district as a member of the Democratic Party from 2009 to 2017. He served on the county commission in Costilla County, Colorado prior to his tenure in the state house.

== Early life and career ==
Vigil was born in San Pablo, Colorado, and married Evelyn. He graduated with a Bachelor of Arts degree in business administration and sociology from Adams State University. Vigil served on the county commission in Costilla County, Colorado. During his tenure in the state house he served as the vice-chair of the Agriculture and Natural Resources Committee and as chair of the Capitol Development Committee.

Vigil defeated Rocky White for the Democratic nomination for a seat in the Colorado House of Representatives from the 62nd district in the 2008 election and defeated Republican nominee Randy Jackson and write-in candidate Rafael Gallegos. He defeated Jackson in the 2010 election. He won reelection in the 2012 election against Republican nominee Tim Walters. He defeated Republican nominee Marcy Freeburg in the 2014 election.

== Political positions ==
Vigil voted in favor of repealing the death penalty in 2009. He opposed legislation which would limit ammunition magazines to fifteen rounds stating mental health treatment should be made more easily available instead. His scores from the American Civil Liberties Union ranged from 89% in 2013, 100% in 2014, 60% in 2015, and 83.3% in 2016.

== Electoral history ==
2008 Colorado House of Representatives 62nd district election
Primary election
Party	Candidate	Votes	%
Democratic	Edward Vigil	3,171	65.94%
Democratic	Rocky White	1,638	34.06%
Total votes		4,809	100.00%
General election
Democratic	Edward Vigil	15,438	57.83%
Republican	Randy Jackson	11,015	41.26%
Democratic	Rafael Gallegos (write-in)	241	0.90%
Total votes		26,694	100.00%

2010 Colorado House of Representatives 62nd district election
Primary election
Party	Candidate	Votes	%
Democratic	Edward Vigil (incumbent)	6,227	100.00%
Total votes		6,227	100.00%
General election
Democratic	Edward Vigil (incumbent)	11,842	55.95%
Republican	Randy Jackson	9,324	44.05%
Total votes		21,166	100.00%

2012 Colorado House of Representatives 62nd district election
Primary election
Party	Candidate	Votes	%
Democratic	Edward Vigil (incumbent)	6,981	100.00%
Total votes		6,981	100.00%
General election
Democratic	Edward Vigil (incumbent)	21,125	60.69%
Republican	Tim Walters	13,685	39.31%
Total votes		34,810	100.00%

2014 Colorado House of Representatives 62nd district election
Primary election
Party	Candidate	Votes	%
Democratic	Edward Vigil (incumbent)	6,141	100.00%
Total votes		6,141	100.00%
General election
Democratic	Edward Vigil (incumbent)	16,419	59.07%
Republican	Marcy Freeburg	11,376	40.93%
Total votes		27,795	100.00%
