= William Harrison (businessman) =

American businessman (born 1986)

William Bruce Harrison (born August 1986) is an American investor in US and UK real estate and businesses.

== Career ==
Harrison was born the grandson of Daniel Jefferson Harrison, a Texas oilman who died in 1974, and the son of Bruce Harrison, a Texas rancher who died in 2004. Through his investment company, Cathexis Holdings, he invested in ISG Ltd, a construction business based in London, in March 2016, Leo Lynch, a mechanical and electrical engineering contractor based in Dublin, in May 2022, and Jones Engineering, an engineering business operating in the UK and Ireland, in June 2022. Through Cathexis, Harrison also invested in the Britishvolt car battery startup, which went into administration in January 2023. ISG Ltd went into administration in September 2024, partly due to the collapse of Britishvolt.

Harrison also bought the 83,000 acres (34,000 ha) Cielo Vista Ranch, part of the Sangre de Cristo Land Grant in the San Luis Valley in Colorado, for $105 million in September 2017. Harrison attempted to limit access to the Cielo Vista ranch by the 5,000 descendants of the 19th century settlers. Judge Kenneth Plotz found in favor of the heirs, and reaffirmed their right to access the land. He is also an investor elsewhere in the Intermountain West: by June 2019, he had acquired 19 mountains, also in Colorado.
