= San Francisco, Colorado =

Town in Costilla County, Colorado, US

Coordinates: 37.102°N 105.348°W

San Francisco is a small town in Costilla County, Colorado, United States.

In 1853–54, San Francisco was established as one of the earliest settlements in the San Luis Valley. About nine miles southeast of San Luis, it was settled by Hispanic settlers along San Francisco Creek. San Francisco is named after the town's patron saint, St. Francis.

San Francisco is the site of Iglesia de San Francisco de Assisi, listed on the National Register of Historic Places.

The Sangre de Cristo Mountains are nearby.

== See also ==
- Great Sand Dunes National Park and Preserve
- Outline of Colorado
- Index of Colorado-related articles
- National Register of Historic Places listings in Costilla County, Colorado
- San Francisco volcanic field
