= San Pablo, Colorado =

Unincorporated community in Costilla County, CO, USA

- Unincorporated community
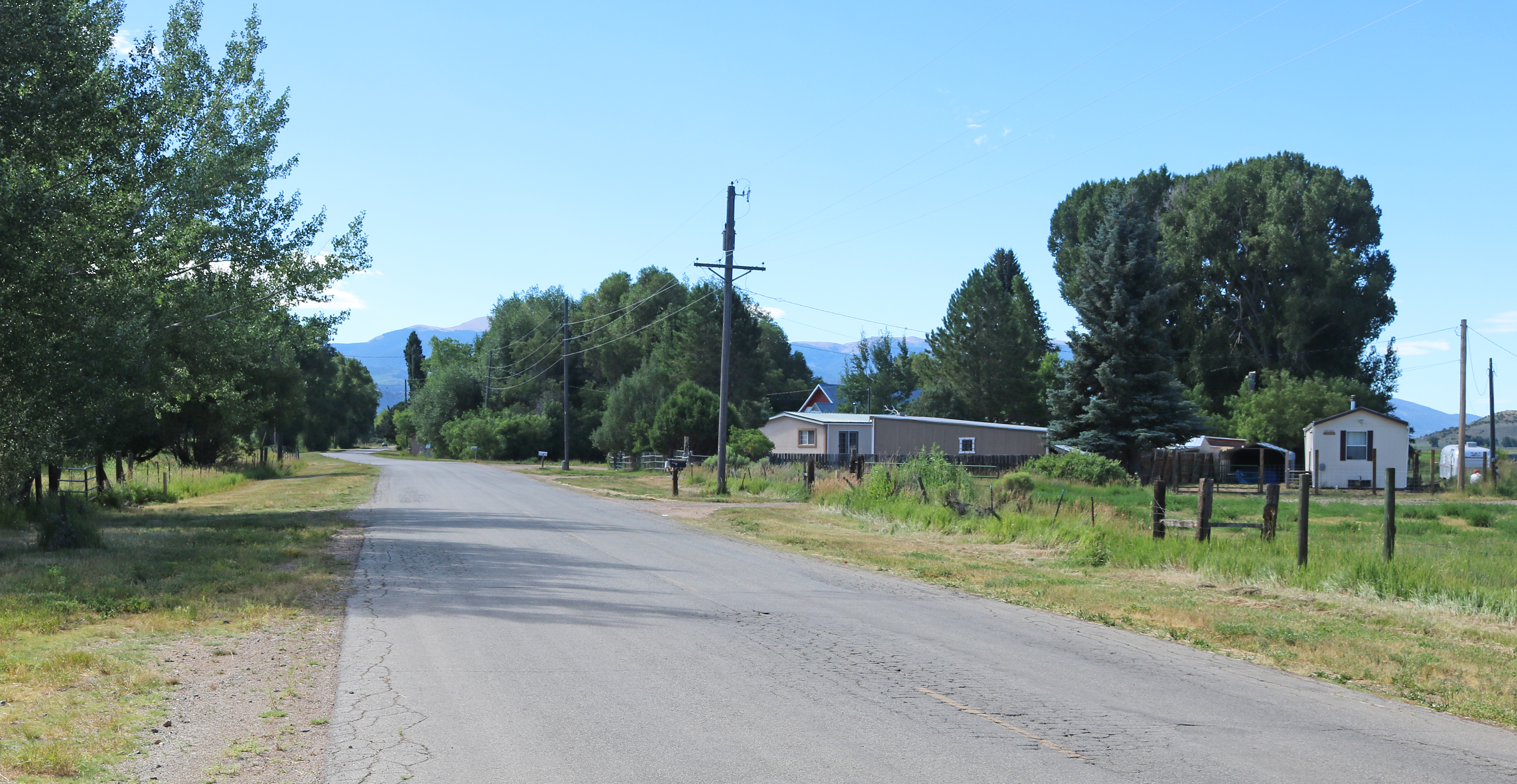
- Looking southeast along County Road 21 in San Pablo

- Location in Costilla County and the state of Colorado San Pablo, Colorado (the United States)
- Coordinates: 37°08′57″N 105°23′49″W
- Country: United States
- State: Colorado
- County: Costilla County
- Elevation: 8,094 ft (2,467 m)
- Time zone: UTC-7 (MST)
  - Summer (DST): UTC-6 (MDT)
- ZIP Code: 81152
- Area code: 719
- GNIS feature: 193028

San Pablo is an unincorporated community located in Costilla County, Colorado, United States. The San Luis post office (Zip Code 81152) serves San Pablo postal addresses. San Pablo is located in the Rio Culebra valley of the Sangre de Cristo Land Grant which was awarded to the family of Carlos Beaubien in 1843.

== Historic Buildings and Areas ==
- Catholic Church
- Presbyterian Church
- School

== Notable person ==
- Edward Vigil, member of the Colorado House of Representatives

== See also ==
- Old Spanish National Historic Trail
- List of cities and towns in Colorado
