= Donald Valdez =

American politician

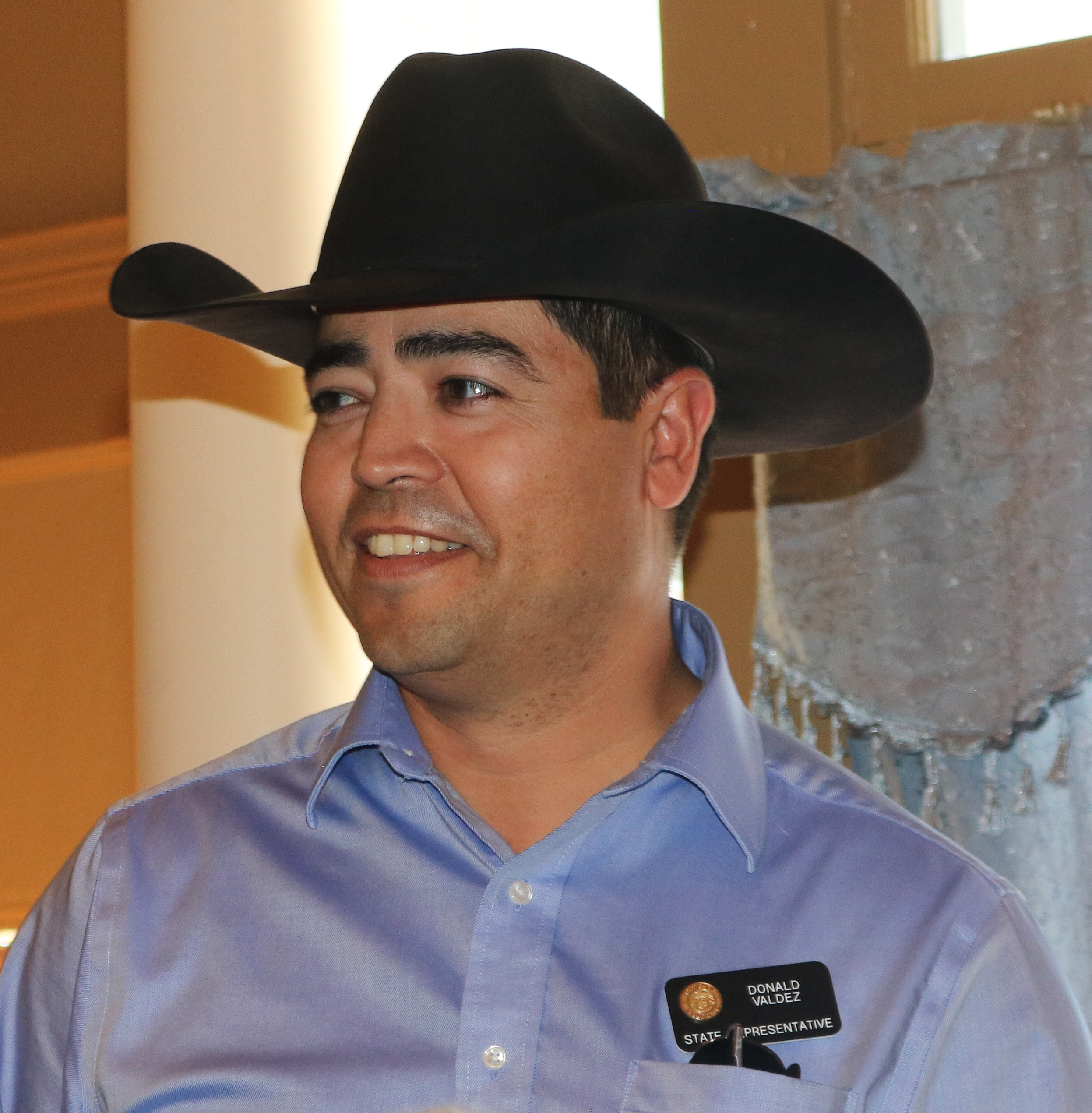

Member of the Colorado House of Representatives from the 62nd district
- In office January 11, 2017 – January 9, 2023
- Preceded by: Ed Vigil
- Succeeded by: Redistricted

Personal details
- Party: Democratic
- Education: Adams State University
- Website: donaldvaldez.com

Donald Valdez is an American farmer and politician who served as a member of the Colorado House of Representatives. He represented District 62, which covered portions of Alamosa, Conejos, Costilla, Huerfano, Mineral, Pueblo, Rio Grande, and Saguache counties.

== Career ==
Valdez has a background in farming and ranching and worked for the Natural Resources Conservation Service before taking office. He has also served as deputy public trustee and deputy sheriff in Conejos County.

Valdez was first elected to his seat in 2016, winning with 55.51% of the vote against Republican opponent Robert Mattive. He took his seat in 2017, succeeding Ed Vigil. He served on the House Agriculture, Livestock, & Natural Resources Committee and the House Local Government Committee.

Valdez was briefly a candidate for Colorado's 3rd congressional district, having announced his candidacy in July 2019. He faced at least two challengers for his party's nomination. However, in November 2019, he abandoned his congressional campaign and decided to seek re-election to his seat in the Colorado House of Representatives.

In February 2021, Valdez announced that he would seek the Democratic nomination for Colorado's 3rd congressional district in 2022. He cited Lauren Boebert's response to the storming of the Capitol as a major reason for launching his second congressional campaign. However, at the Colorado District 3 Democratic Assembly held on April 5, 2022, Valdez got only 28.6% of the 297 votes cast by the delegates, falling short of the 30% required to appear on the primary ballot, effectively ending his candidacy.
