= ISG Ltd =

UK construction company

- Formerly: Interior Services Group
- Type: Subsidiary
- Traded as: LSE: ISG
- Industry: fit-out, construction, engineering services
- Founded: 1989
- Headquarters: London, England
- Area served: Europe, Middle East, Asia
- Key people: Zoe Price (CEO)
- Revenue: £2,190 million (2022)
- Number of employees: 2,982 (2021)
- Parent: Cathexis
- Website: isgltd.com

ISG Ltd (formerly Interior Services Group) is a privately owned, London-based construction company that employed around 3,000 people, mainly in the UK, mainland Europe and the Middle East. In terms of turnover, at one point it was the sixth biggest contractor in the UK; it went into administration in September 2024.

Founded in 1989 as Stanhope Interiors, it was renamed Interior plc following a management buyout during 1995. Two years later, the business, which was then trading as Interior Services Group, was floated on the Alternative Investment Market of the London Stock Exchange. It expanded rapidly during the late 1990s and early 2000s, branching into construction management and facilities management. During the mid 2000s, the firm opted to reduce its presence in some markets, such as France and Germany, while embarking on an spree of acquisitions, including Propencity, Commtech Asia, and Pearce Group.

Following the start of the Great Recession in the late 2000s, both orders and profits at the company dipped sharply. In response, ISG sought out new business on the still-growing international market. During March 2016, ISG was taken private by the US-based firm Cathexis (the investment vehicle of Texan billionaire William Harrison). During the early 2020s, the company's fiscal condition was impacted by the COVID-19 pandemic. In September 2024, following months of concerns about its finances and a stalled sale of the group, eight ISG businesses entered voluntary administration (and 11 others went into liquidation); it was called the biggest collapse in Britain's construction sector since Carillion in 2018. At the time of its collapse, ISG was working on over 600 construction, fit out and retail sites, including 69 UK public sector projects worth at least £1.84bn. It owed over £1.2bn. Around 2,200 ISG UK employees were immediately made redundant.

== History ==
ISG originated as Stanhope Interiors, which was founded in 1989 by David King. During 1995, King led a management buyout of the firm from the indebted Stanhope in 1995, when it was renamed Interior plc.

During early 1998, Interior PLC opted to move into construction management via the launch of a new subsidiary. Around this time, the firm experienced a period of rapid growth.

In 1997, the business, which was then trading as Interior Services Group, was floated on the Alternative Investment Market of the London Stock Exchange. By this time, much of the firm's work involved kitting out offices across the City of London. During 2003, it opted to reduce its presence in the poorly performing economies of France and Germany. One year later, David King became Interior Services Group's chief executive while Roy Dantzic was appointed its chairman; other changes around this time included the sale of the firm's facilities management division to Erinaceous for £10 million.

During 2005, Interior Services Group paid £12.5 million in exchange for the social housing specialist Propencity. One year later, it also bought the facilities management firm ISG Asia for £4.6 million. In 2007, the firm acquired the regional contractor Pearce Group in a deal that was potentially valued at around £20 million; this purchase expanded Interior Services Group's regional coverage, which had traditionally centred around the southern, eastern and northern regions into the west of England and South Wales, as well as expanding its presence in the affordable housing and student accommodation sectors. That same year, it also purchased the fit-out specialist Cathedral Contracts in exchange for £11.8 million, and technical consultancy firm Commtech Asia for £1.2 million.

During the late 2000s, the company's profits and order book both dipped sharply; this was mostly attributed to the wider economic downturn known as the Great Recession. In September 2011, Interior Services Group reported a record high in terms of revenue while profits for its struggling south west construction division had roughly halved. During the early 2010s, the firm's then-chief executive David Lawther responded to the decline by reorienting the company towards the still-growing international market. In April 2013, the firm officially changed its name to ISG plc. That same year, its construction arm underwent restructuring, which involved the streamlining of its eastern construction division while retail activity was placed under a single management team.

In March 2016, ISG was taken private by the US-based firm Cathexis (the investment vehicle of Texan billionaire William Harrison), previously a substantial shareholder, in a £85m takeover. At that time, the remuneration of ISG's highest paid director, David Cossell, tripled to £3m.

In May 2021, ISG reported its results for 2020, affected by the COVID-19 pandemic. Revenue was down 23% to £2.0bn (2019: £2.6bn); underlying EBITDA for the year was £37.6m (2019: £63.3m). Fit-out was ISG's biggest source of revenue (£1,042.3m in 2020), followed by construction (£690.8m) and engineering services (£293.3m).

In the year to December 2021, ISG reported revenues of £2.263bn, still not back to its pre-pandemic peak, while pre-tax profits increased to £18.9m, from £8.9m a year earlier; fit-out remained ISG's largest service line, the company had 3,001 employees and derived £1.8bn of its revenues from the UK. In early 2022, ISG acquired a majority shareholding in ESS Modular, selling it later that year to Cathexis. In 2022, ISG revenues slipped to £2.19bn, while pre-tax profit was down 38% to £11.5m. ISG's order book was adversely affected by the August 2022 suspension of the Britishvolt gigafactory in Blyth, Northumberland, and delays to a film studio project in Hertfordshire. In November 2023, ISG CEO Matt Blowers and other senior staff held urgent meetings with stakeholders to reassure them about the financial status of the group.

Appointed in 2022, Blowers left ISG as the business underwent a 'fundamental reset' in February 2024, being replaced as CEO by Zoe Price. There were also changes affecting the company secretary, vice-chair and chief financial officer roles; in the last five years, ISG's highest-paid executive had been paid over £18m.

In October 2023, a subcontractor's winding-up petition stoked staff and supplier concern about ISG's financial stability, and the company began to look for a buyer or a cash injection from Cathexis. In July 2024, ISG finances incurred a £14m hit after a key supplier went into liquidation, but, despite interest from 11 private equity and trade buyers, the sale process halted after ISG received an offer for the group; ISG staff and suppliers were told the company would be sold by Cathexis in the near future, and a significant investment would recapitalise the business and support a return to normal trading. The prospective buyer was reported to be a UK-registered holding company called Antipodean Holdings with two equal shareholders: South African Andre Redinger and Australian James Overton.

=== Administration ===
No further progress on the sale was announced. Administrator Ernst & Young (EY) later said that on 2 September 2024, Antipodean had dropped its offer to £1 while remaining committed to funding working capital needs. However, Antipodean provided no evidence it had the necessary funds. ISG's board then reopened talks with a prospective buyer of ISG Fit Out, but this buyer later dropped out, amid concerns about the group's VAT debts and novation of contracts.

Late on Thursday 19 September 2024, six ISG Ltd subsidiaries – ISG Construction, ISG Engineering Services, ISG Retail, ISG Jackson, ISG UK Retail and ISG Central Services – were reported to have applied to go into administration. ISG Fit Out, which accounted for around £500m of ISG revenue and was profitable, was not included in the initial application, but further applications followed on 20 September 2024, including ISG Fit Out and ISG Interior Services Group (on 24 September, Cathexis-owned ESS Modular and subsidiary Spatial Initiative also went into administration, with the loss of 100 jobs, and owing £7m, though its insolvency was unrelated to ISG's collapse). ISG's failure was described as UK construction's biggest collapse since Carillion in 2018. It later emerged that, in addition to the eight businesses that went into administration, a further 11 ISG businesses, including the holding company ISG Ltd, were liquidated. Together, these businesses owed £111.2m to other ISG companies and £53.4m to HMRC.

According to Construction News, some site workers were told that the firm – ranked by turnover as the sixth biggest contractor in the UK – had gone under, amid rumours that it had been struggling to pay subcontractors. One supplier had filed a winding-up petition against ISG Engineering Services; other suppliers facing huge debts criticised ISG for "stringing them along" for months.

In a late night email to staff on 19 September, CEO Zoe Price apologised for the news leaking out ahead of a planned announcement on Monday 23 September 2024. She explained ISG's problems stemmed from legacy issues relating to large loss-making contracts secured between 2018 and 2020, which, as a result of the COVID-19 pandemic, had a significant effect on liquidity. In the circumstances, "it was not possible to conclude a sale, as the purchaser could not satisfy the funding needed to recapitalise the business"; Cathexis had also looked unsuccessfully at refinancing the company, and selling individual businesses had not been practicable in the timescale, leaving "no option but to file for administration". Andre Redinger of Antipodean Holdings disputed Price's position on the sale. A "fair deal" had been on the table, he said; Antipodean had a robust turnaround plan which it believed could save jobs and return ISG to growth and profitability, but ISG suddenly stopped communicating on 12 September. Antipodean said it had also identified a senior industry figure to be ISG's new chairman.

EY's appointment as administrators was confirmed on 20 September 2024. Most of the 2,380 people employed by ISG in the UK were made redundant immediately, with 200 initially retained to assist the administrators, by December 2024, this had reduced to 22. Regarding the failed sale to Antipodean Holdings, a joint EY/ISG statement said: "the potential purchaser could not, despite repeated requests of them to do so, adequately demonstrate that they had the funding needed to recapitalise the business and keep it solvent." Redinger defended Antipodean's approach saying ISG's liabilities were "three or four times" his first offer, hence the lower bid; the initial bid was based on an assumed deficit of £200m, but the figure jumped to over £500m, with rival firms suggesting the total deficit could be over £800m. Later, in December 2024, EY reported ISG had total debts of £1.1bn (including inter-company debt, cash owed to trade creditors, and a £100m tax debt); its overdue accounts for 2023 would have reported £148m in contract write-downs and a £133m pre-tax loss, but the company had only £35m in cash and assets.

Because of ISG's extensive involvement in ongoing public sector projects, UK government officials were reported to be monitoring the situation and appointing advisors to implement "detailed contingency plans"; on 24 September 2024 the Insolvency Service set up information pages for employees and creditors. ISG was working on 69 live public sector projects worth at least £1.84bn, including schools, police stations and prisons. It had 22 ongoing Ministry of Justice (MoJ) projects, including a £48m court building in Blackpool, a £300m extension of HM Prison Spring Hill in Buckinghamshire, work at neighbouring HM Prison Grendon, and upgrades for HM Prison Guys Marsh in Dorset and HM Prison Liverpool; ISG was the contractor on 17% of the MoJ's prison expansion portfolio, amounting to 3,634 places, with the company's collapse expected to add between three and 18 months to the programme for the prisons it was working on. In addition to the programme delays, the MoJ later said ISG's collapse would cost it an estimated £300m on its new prisons programme, and impact its fire-safety remediation work. ISG also had work for the Department for Work and Pensions, a £518m Ministry of Defence contract, and £190m of contracts for the Department for Education.

At the time of the company's collapse, ISG was engaged on 100 construction sites and 500 fit out and retail sites. Ongoing ISG schemes included the £170m fit-out of Google's London headquarters at King's Cross (due for completion in late 2025), conversion of Regents Quarter (also in King's Cross, London) into a life sciences campus, another life sciences building (£65m) in London's Canary Wharf, a £44m conversion of a former IKEA store in Coventry into an arts and culture centre (later taken on by John Graham Construction), various school projects, including the £108m Fairwater Campus project in Cardiff, Hempland primary school in York, Woodlands Meed special school in Burgess Hill, two schools in Bishop's Stortford, Essex, and Exeter's Matford Brook Academy (later demolished for not meeting required standards), sports centres in Clayton-le-Moors, Lancashire (later taken over by Universal Civils and Build), and Chesterfield, Derbyshire, three data centres (total value £500m) in southern England, and a £200m biotechnology centre in Billingham, Cleveland. ISG clients were told to move quickly to find replacement contractors, or risk their projects being delayed for months, though some firms were cautious about taking on ISG contracts ("You don't know what liabilities you're going to find," one firm said).

On 8 October 2024, administrator EY told subcontractors and suppliers there were insufficient funds available to pay ISG creditors. On 21 October, EY filed a report showing ISG suppliers to seven ISG businesses (excluding ISG Fit Out) had made over £180m in claims for unpaid bills - a figure which was likely to rise. Former ISG employees were owed over £72.3m while HMRC was owed £54.4m by seven of the eight ISG businesses. One electrical contractor was owed over £20m. That electrical contractor, Phoenix ME, told its suppliers that they would not be paid because Phoenix had not been paid by ISG. In December 2024, the eight collapsed ISG firms were reported to owe £308m; ISG Construction, ISG Retail, ISG Engineering and ISG Fit Out accounted for the bulk of trade creditor losses, with ISG Fit Out owing £111.5m, and HMRC owed a total of £89.4m (excluding the £53.4m owed by the 11 liquidated ISG businesses).

On 25 October 2024, Seventynine Lighting, a Gloucestershire-based ISG lighting subcontractor, went into administration, with 30 staff being made redundant, after ISG's collapse left an "insurmountable" bad debt of £2.1m, of which £1.8m was owed to trade creditors for work carried out on ISG projects. In November 2024, glazing specialist Vitrine Systems went into administration due to a debt of £187,000 owed by ISG, with 23 people made redundant. Yorkshire-based Hensall Mechanical Services blamed ISG's collapse for a 40% drop in turnover and a fall in pre-tax profit from £2.6m to £952,000 in the year to 31 December 2024.

In November 2024, Morris & Spottiswood Group acquired the former ISG Cathedral business, part of ISG Fit Out, saving 111 jobs.

In May 2025, administrator EY confirmed over two thirds of ISG's former employees were pursuing legal claims regarding the way they were made redundant. In March 2026, it was announced that 1,687 former ISG employees had secured awards of up to £5,600 each, over £9m in total, following legal claims against the company for failing to consult before staff were made redundant.

In September 2025, administrator EY extended its oversight of the collapsed ISG businesses to September 2026, subcontractors began a class action against the government after project bank accounts failed to protect their cash, and questions were asked about a potential EY conflict of interest as the firm had previously provided restructuring advice to ISG's parent company and its banks.

In January 2026, with administration of ISG companies now shared between EY (eight businesses) and Azets (11 businesses), ISG was reported to have owed a total of £1.2bn to unsecured creditors when it went into administration. In November 2026, administrators EY said they had recovered £45.5m from ISG's debtors, and were actively pursuing further legal claims. Two months previously, the High Court approved a two-year extension to the administration, taking the process to 19 September 2028.

==== Industry reaction ====
As news of ISG's collapse broke, the Construction Leadership Council called a meeting of key construction trade bodies, education and skills providers and the Department for Business and Trade to discuss the industry's response; it urged contractors to pay subcontractors promptly with ISG's collapse likely to wreak havoc down supply chains (ISG was estimated to owe its supply chain over £700m). Contractor Balfour Beatty contacted its suppliers to ascertain the impact of ISG's failure, potentially so it could speed up payments. The 1,200-member National Federation of Roofing Contractors calling on the government to increase penalties for late payment; numerous NFRC members experienced heavy losses when ISG collapsed.

A Build UK and CITB working group was established to support ISG apprentices and graduates; Build UK CEO Suzannah Nichol said ISG's collapse was "devastating" for the sector and could lead to other firms going under. David Frise, CEO of the Building Engineering Services Association, said "the lessons of Carillion have not been learned", adding "ISG needs to be construction's last major financial collapse that threatens entire supply chains, and the government must help us put a more robust and fit-for-purpose industry in place."

In October 2024, former ISG staff called for an investigation of the company's owners and directors saying problems were emerging nearly two years previously.

In March 2025, the Financial Reporting Council began an investigation into the ISG's auditors, focused on MacIntyre Hudson LLP's audit of ISG's financial statements for the year to 31 December 2022, the company's final results.

== Operations ==
ISG employed around 3,000 people, mainly in Europe and the Middle East, with offices in the UK, Germany, Iberia (Spain and Portugal), Luxembourg and Switzerland, and two offices in the UAE.

== Notable projects ==
- Renovation of Royal Festival Hall, London (2007)
- Fit-out of St Pancras International railway station, London (2008)
- Renovation of Zayed Sports City Stadium, Abu Dhabi, United Arab Emirates (2009)
- Lee Valley VeloPark, London (2011)
- Humber Gateway Wind Farm visitor centre (2013)
- Bush House, London (2013).
- Seevic College (2013–14), notable for a legal ruling on the interim payment provisions in Part 8 of the Local Democracy, Economic Development and Construction Act 2009
- Royal Mint visitor centre, Llantrisant (2016)
- Wigan Town Hall restoration (2016)
- BBC Cymru Wales New Broadcasting House, Cardiff (2019)
- Waterloo International redevelopment, London (ongoing in 2021)
- Lord's cricket ground, London: redevelopment of Compton and Edrich stands (2019–2021)
- Cardiff Bus Interchange (due to complete in 2023, opened in June 2024)
- New facility for UCL Queen Square Institute of Neurology and Institute of Dementia Research (due to complete in 2024; project to be completed by Mace)
- Britishvolt gigafactory, in Blyth, Northumberland (construction started in September 2021 and was suspended in August 2022, after which Britishvolt went into administration) (Note: The owner of ISG, William Harrison, was also a shareholder in Britishvolt (through Cathexis Holdings) before it went into administration in January 2023.)
- A £32.7m restoration and redevelopment of Birmingham's Moseley Road Baths
