= Kenneth Ham =

American astronaut and naval aviator (born 1964)

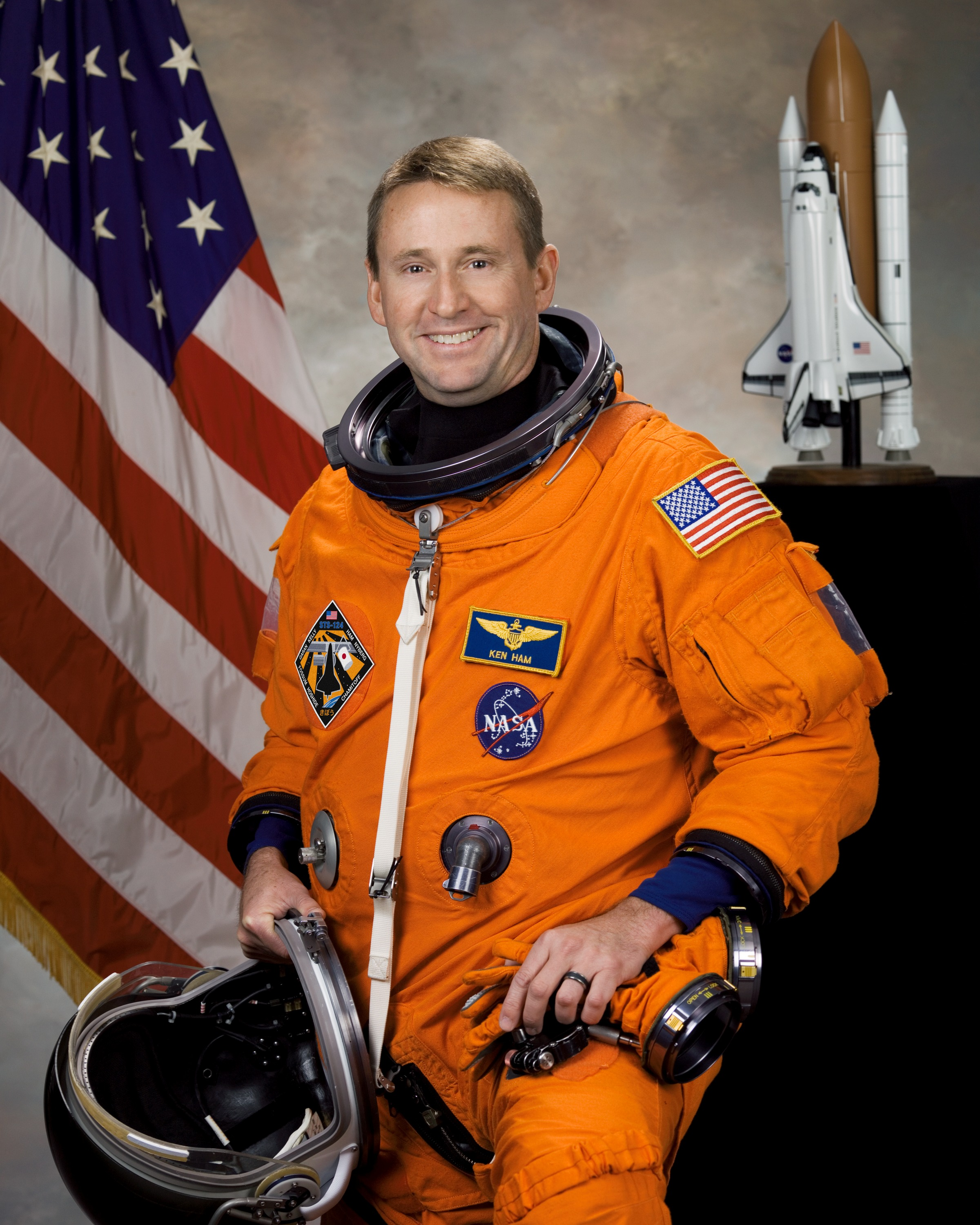
- Born: Kenneth Todd Ham; December 12, 1964 (age 61); Plainfield, New Jersey, U.S.
- Other name: Hock
- Education: United States Naval Academy (BS); Naval Postgraduate School (MS)
- Space career

NASA astronaut
- Rank: Captain, USN
- Time in space: 25d 12h 41m
- Selection: NASA Group 17 (1998)
- Missions: STS-124; STS-132

Kenneth Todd Ham (born December 12, 1964) is a retired American astronaut and a captain in the United States Navy. Ham was selected for NASA's astronaut program in August 1998, while serving as the F/A-18E/F Super Hornet lead carrier suitability test pilot. Ham's aviator call sign is "Hock". Ham traveled to space twice as part of the Space Shuttle program. He flew on STS-124 as pilot and then on STS-132 as mission commander.

== Early life and education ==
Ken Ham was born in Plainfield, New Jersey, to Ed and Marion Ham. He graduated from Arthur L. Johnson High School in Clark, New Jersey in 1983, where he had started taking flying lessons at the suggestion of a high school guidance counselor.

He then went on to the United States Naval Academy, graduating in 1987 with a Bachelor of Science degree in aerospace engineering. In 1996, he earned a Master of Science degree in aeronautical engineering from the Naval Postgraduate School. A Distinguished Graduate of the U.S. Naval Test Pilot School, Ham is also a member of the Society of Experimental Test Pilots and the U.S. Naval Academy Alumni Association.

== Military career ==
After earning his commission as an ensign in the U.S. Navy in May 1987, Ham received flight training in T-34C, T-2C, and TA-4J aircraft. Ham was designated a Naval Aviator in October 1989, and subsequently received F/A-18 Hornet training. His operational assignments included stints with strike fighter squadrons VFA-132 and VFA-105. During a temporary assignment to NASA's Johnson Space Center in Houston, Texas, Ham served as a crew member aboard NASA's reduced gravity research aircraft—a former USAF KC-135 Stratotanker nicknamed the "Vomit Comet".

At the Naval Postgraduate School/Test Pilot School, Ham participated in a cooperative program, studying aeronautical engineering for 18 months, followed by 12 months of test pilot training. He was selected as one of five Navy pilots on the F/A-18E/F Super Hornet Integrated Test Team, responsible for developing a new fleet aircraft. In this role, Ham conducted flight tests involving arrested landings, catapult assisted takeoffs, weapon separation, and evaluation of the aircraft's propulsion stability, performance and general flying qualities.

During two deployments to the Mediterranean Sea, Ham conducted combat missions over Bosnia and North Iraq, serving as an air wing strike leader, F/A-18 demonstration pilot, and night vision goggle instructor. He has over 7,500 flight hours in more than 45 aircraft types, with over 300 shipboard and 300 land-based arrested landings. Hock still flies the F-5AT and F-5N+.

== Astronaut career ==
Ham has served as CAPCOM for Space Shuttle ascent/entry and orbit, as well as the International Space Station (ISS). His most recent CAPCOM assignment was for NASA's "return to flight" mission, STS-114, of the Space Shuttle.

He made his first spaceflight as pilot of STS-124, in which Discovery flew to the International Space Station in June 2008. Discovery delivered the Japanese Experiment Module-Pressurized Module (JEM-PM) and the Japanese Remote Manipulator System to the International Space Station (ISS).

He also flew as the commander of mission STS-132, which launched on May 14, 2010 and landed on May 26, 2010. The STS-132 mission completed in 186 orbits and delivered the Russian-built Mini Research Module (MRM1) to the ISS.

Upon completion of his second spaceflight, Ham was assigned to the NASA Aircraft Operations Division as a T-38N instructor pilot and WB-57F research pilot.

== Post-NASA career ==
In June 2012, Ham left the space agency. As of July 2013, Captain Ham served as the Chair of the Aerospace Engineering Department at the United States Naval Academy, in Annapolis, Maryland. In September 2014, Ham joined Bigelow Aerospace in Las Vegas, Nevada to develop a training program for astronauts that would support Bigelow's proposed space habitats. 2015 to present, he has worked in Tactical Air Support Inc first as a consultant, then as Director Technology Development, then GM of Flight Operations and is currently the Chief Operating Officer.

== Personal life ==
Ham's recreational interests include baseball, running, weight lifting, general aviation, snow skiing, water skiing, skydiving and scuba diving. On October 7, 2014, Ham was inducted into the New Jersey Aviation Hall of Fame for his contributions to spaceflight and aviation throughout his career. Also in his spare time, he has been the resident astronaut on the ISSET run program Mission Discovery, where he shares his experiences with teenagers and tries to help them learn new skills throughout the length of time the program runs.
