= Chama, Costilla County, Colorado =

Unincorporated community in Costilla County, CO, USA

Chama, Colorado
- unincorporated community
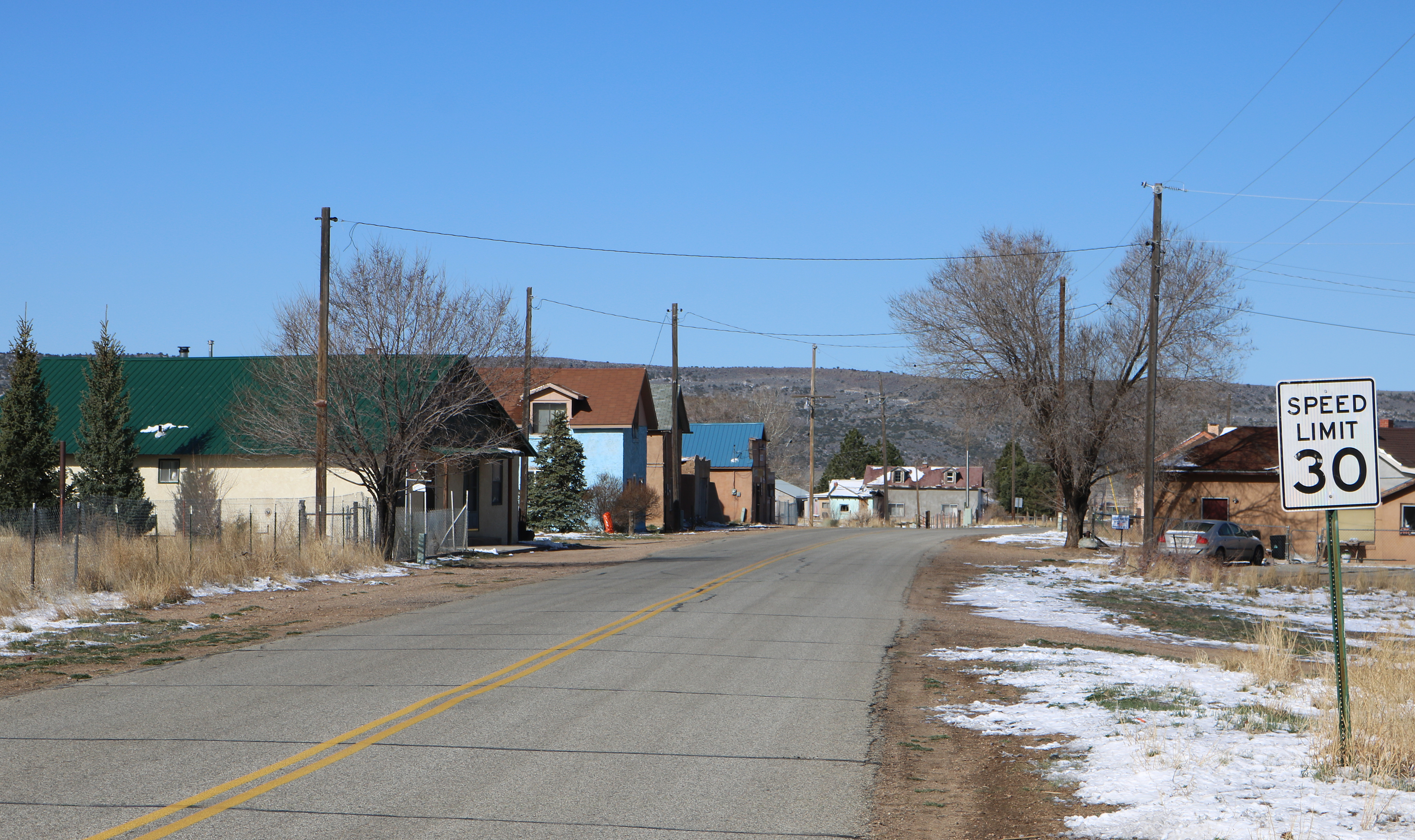
- County Road L.7 in Chama.

- Location of Chama, Colorado. Chama (Colorado)
- Coordinates: 37.1620°N 105.3783°W
- Country: United States
- State: Colorado
- County: Costilla
- Established: 1860

Government
  - Type: unincorporated community
  - Body: Costilla County
- Elevation: 8,186 ft (2,495 m)

Population
  - Total: 63
- Time zone: UTC−07:00 (MST)
  - Summer (DST): UTC−06:00 (MDT)
- ZIP code: 81126
- Area code: 719
- GNIS pop ID: 203659

Chama is an unincorporated community and U.S. Post Office located in Costilla County, Colorado, United States.

== History ==
Chama is located in the Rio Culebra valley which is part of the Sangre de Cristo Land Grant was awarded to the family of Carlos Beaubien in 1843 by the government of New Mexico. The town of Chama was established by settlers from Chamita, New Mexico, in 1860. The Chama, Colorado, post office opened on May 3, 1907. The Chama school was taken down between the years of 1999 and 2001.

== Description ==
Most of Chama's houses are made of adobe. Many of them are very old. There are also a lot of rocks and "chamiso" sagebrush in Chama. The community lies at the foot of the Culebra Ranch.

== See also ==
- Alamosa, CO Micropolitan Statistical Area
- List of populated places in Colorado
- List of post offices in Colorado
- Old Spanish National Historic Trail
- San Luis Valley
