= Capilla de San Isidro =

- U.S. National Register of Historic Places
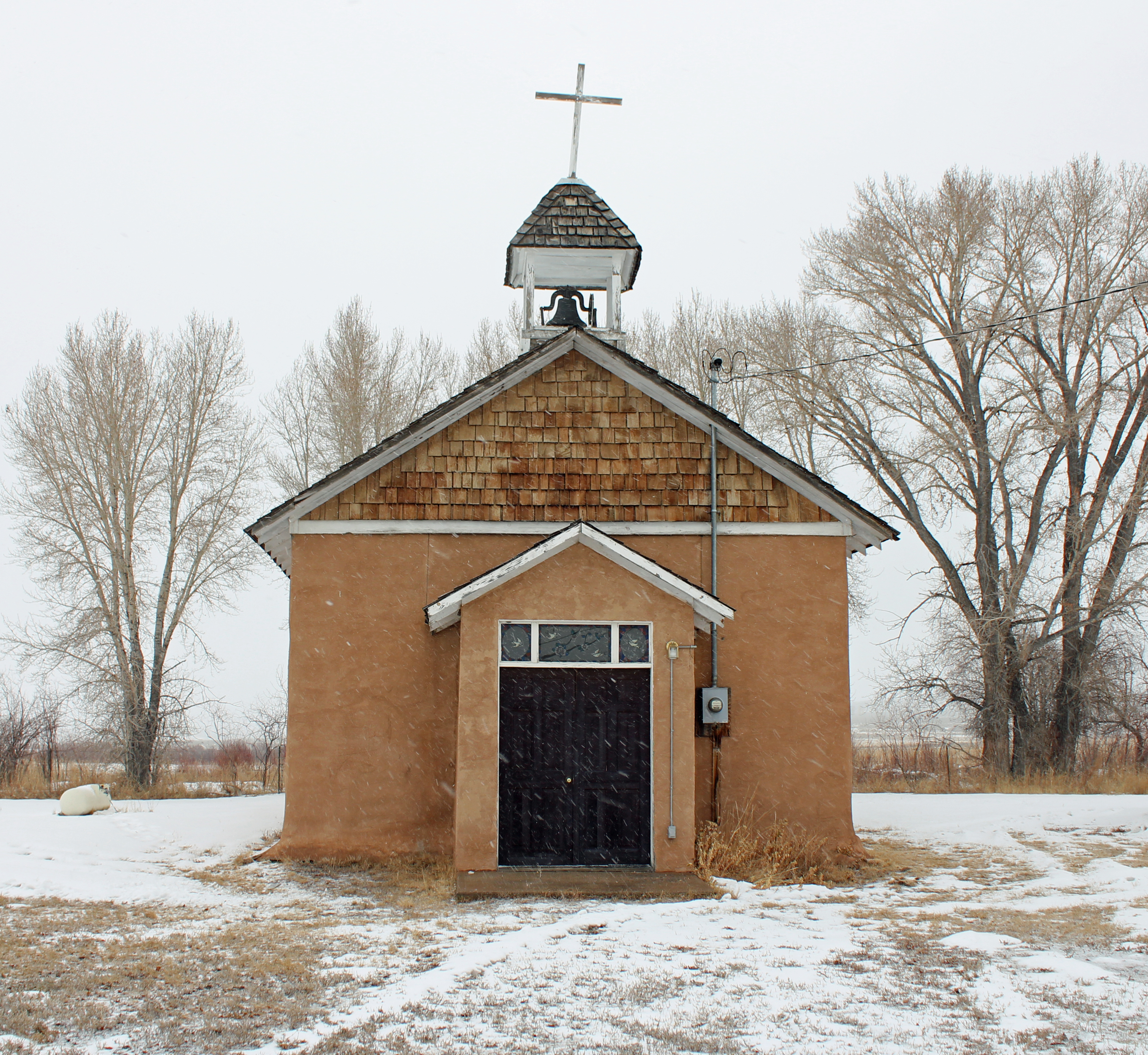

- Location within Colorado
- Location: 21801 County Road K5, in or near Los Fuertes, Colorado
- Coordinates: 37°08′05″N 105°22′49″W
- Area: about one acre
- Built: c.1894
- MPS: Culebra River Villages of Costilla County, Colorado
- NRHP reference No.: 97001281
- Added to NRHP: July 23, 2013

The Capilla de San Isidro, in Costilla County, Colorado, near Los Fuertes, was built around 1894. It was listed on the National Register of Historic Places in 2013.

It is located at 21801 County Road K5, 0.3 miles east of its intersection with County Road 21.
