= A. A. Salazar House =

Historic house in Colorado, United States

- A.A. Salazar House
- U.S. National Register of Historic Places
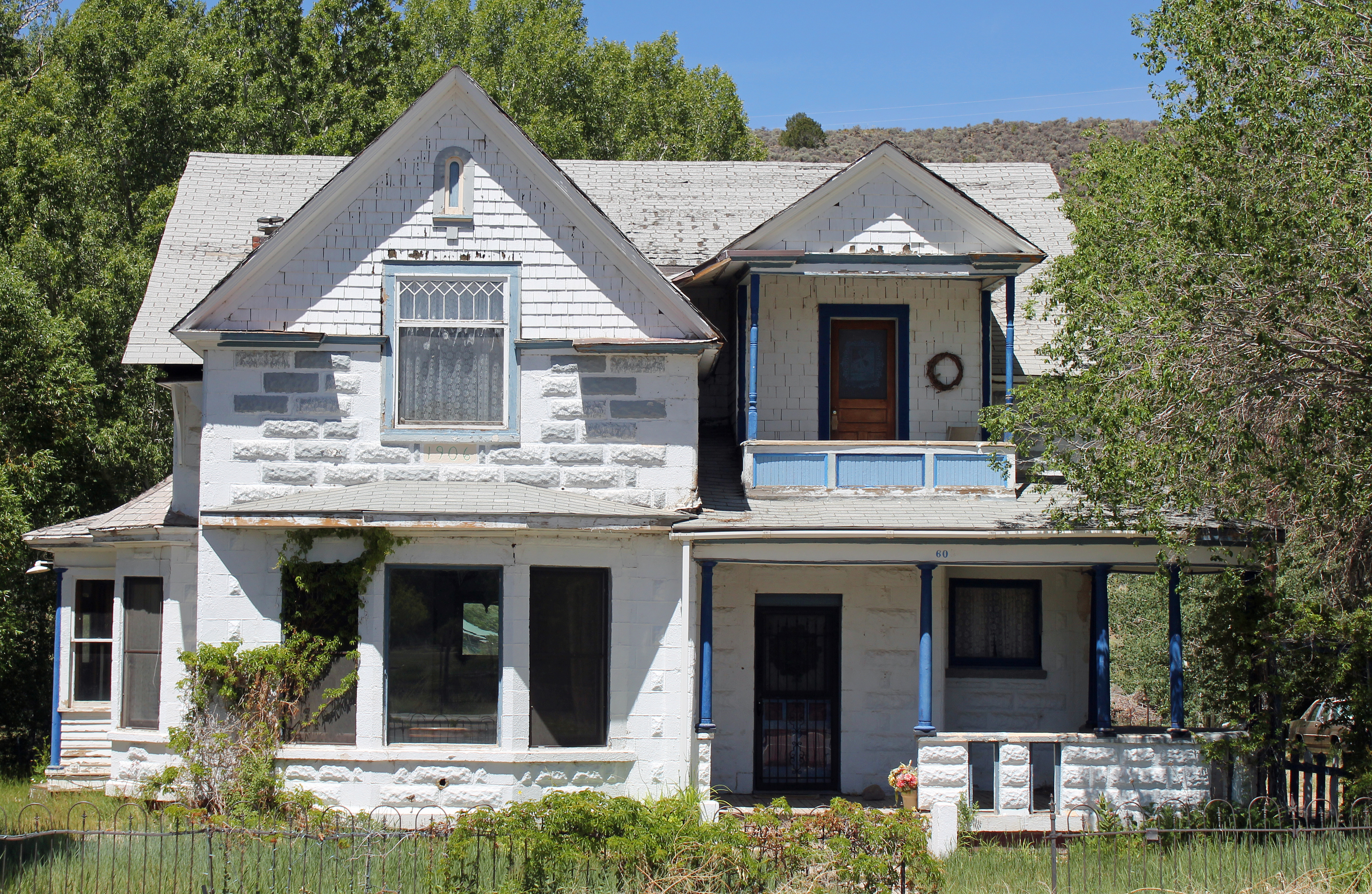

- Location within Colorado
- Location: 603 Main St., San Luis, Colorado
- Coordinates: 37°12′08″N 105°25′31″W
- Area: less than one acre
- Built: 1906
- Architectural style: Queen Anne
- MPS: Ornamental Concrete Block Buildings in Colorado MPS
- NRHP reference No.: 97001281
- Added to NRHP: January 23, 1998

The A.A. Salazar House, at 603 Main St. in San Luis, Colorado, United States, is a Queen Anne–style house built in 1906. It was listed on the National Register of Historic Places in 1998.

It is a residence built of ornamental concrete blocks.

It was built for Antonio A. and Genoveva Gallegos Salazar.

The property was occupied as a bed and breakfast for some time.
