= Britishvolt =

UK electric vehicle battery manufacturing startup

Power by Britishvolt Limited
- Type: Limited company
- Industry: Battery manufacture
- Founded: December 2019; 6 years ago
- Founders: Orral Nadjari; Lars Carlstrom
- Defunct: November 2024
- Fate: Liquidation
- Headquarters: Blyth, Northumberland, United Kingdom
- Key people: David A Collard (CEO, Scale Facilitation), Tony Laydon (CEO, Recharge UK)
- Parent: Scale Facilitation

Power by Britishvolt Limited, trading as Britishvolt, was a UK startup manufacturer of lithium-ion batteries. The company initially planned production of batteries for the automotive industry. It began construction of a gigafactory at Blyth in northeast England in 2021, but work was halted in August 2022 due to funding difficulties.

The company went into administration on 17 January 2023. In February 2023, it was reportedly bought out of administration by an Australian startup. A subsidiary of US-based Scale Facilitation, Recharge Industries said it planned to resume construction in late 2023. However, amid continued financial difficulties, a deal to fund the business was not finalised, and in April 2024, the Blyth site was sold for redevelopment as a data centre campus. Britishvolt went into liquidation in November 2024.

== History ==
Britishvolt was incorporated as Power by Britishvolt Ltd in December 2019. Its cofounders included Swedish former investment banker Orral Nadjari and Swedish automotive entrepreneur Lars Carlstrom. Carlstrom quit as Britishvolt's chairman in December 2020 after details of a tax fraud conviction in Sweden were revealed (though Carlstrom later said the fraud conviction was dredged up after he disagreed with Britishvolt's rapid hiring and its decision to develop its own in-house battery tech). US billionaire William Harrison was a shareholder through Cathexis Holdings; Harrison also owned ISG, the contractor appointed to lead construction of Britishvolt's factory.

Britishvolt rented a serviced office in London's Mayfair district and Newfield House, a mansion east of the Northumberland town of Blyth, used as office space. The company also had a team in Canada led by former Quebec premier Philippe Couillard and Anna Vujovic.

It later emerged that management consultancy EY was heavily involved in Britishvolt's formation, with the startup sometimes spending more money paying consultants, including EY, than it paid its own staff. Insiders said EY had been instrumental in helping Britishvolt become a functioning enterprise ("They wrote the whole business plan from scratch, they did everything"), and three senior Britishvolt staff, including its chief financial officer, were all hired from EY in 2021.

=== Product and market development ===
Sports car maker Lotus was among four automotive manufacturers that signed memorandums of understanding to be supplied by Britishvolt. In March 2022 Aston Martin also committed to working with Britishvolt to develop energy cells, and former Britishvolt CEO Nadjari had also intended to target Elon Musk's Tesla. In June 2022, Britishvolt signed a deal with South Korea-based POSCO Chemical to secure the supply of cathode and anode materials for its supply chain. In September 2022, Britishvolt batteries passed safety tests, allowing development cells to be shipped to seven customers for further testing.

=== Factory construction ===
Initially the company was reported to be planning a battery factory near Bridgend in South Wales or near Coventry, but, in December 2020, Blyth was confirmed as the location for the Britishvolt manufacturing plant. Britishvolt secured the partnership of Siemens for this project. In July 2021 plans for a £2.6bn gigafactory employing 3,000 people were approved, with the new Britishvolt plant to be located on former coalyards adjacent to the former power station in Cambois, near Blyth. Britishvolt appointed ISG as its construction partner; ISG began work on clearing the site and creating foundations for the factory, taking its first delivery of aggregate from a Cumbria quarry in July 2021 and starting construction on 6 September 2021. West Yorkshire-based engineering and services business NG Bailey was also engaged on the Blyth project and on a related development at Hams Hall in the West Midlands.

Anglo-Swiss mining giant Glencore invested in Britishvolt in August 2021, and was part of a £50M funding round with NG Bailey and Norway's Carbon Transition ASA. In late 2021 Britishvolt was reported to be considering a stock market listing in either London or New York to help raise the £2 billion needed for the factory's construction. In January 2022 the UK government, through its Automotive Transformation Fund, committed to investing £100M in the Britishvolt project, alongside asset management company Abrdn and its property investment arm Tritax, supporting development of what was planned to be Britain's fourth-largest building. Glencore invested a further £40M in February 2022, topping up its previous funding of Britishvolt that then valued the company at more than $1 billion (£740M). In May 2022, Britishvolt was set to acquire a German lithium-ion battery manufacturer, Monbat Holding GmbH, for €36M from Bulgaria's Monbat, with the latter taking shares in Britishvolt. In June 2022, Britishvolt announced an investment by Sunbelt Rentals, the main operating subsidiary of the Ashtead Group.

In July 2022, the Department for Business, Energy and Industrial Strategy confirmed the UK government grant. To support the factory, a supplier park, power connections, extensive road and rail transport infrastructure would be needed. Staged tranches of funding would be therefore provided as the project developed. Further fundraising efforts were being led by US-based Bank of America and Citibank, with London investment bank Peel Hunt and Lazard as financial adviser.

==== Suspension of construction ====
ISG suspended construction work at Blyth and largest shareholder Nadjari quit as CEO in August 2022 amid funding concerns; The Guardian said the project had been put on "life support" to cut spending while it looked to conclude its next round of funding. The company said: "We are ahead in our enabling works at the gigasite in Northumberland ... this has allowed us to now take the time to focus on the design work for the site and to reschedule some construction work so that we can optimise the build process for each of the project's four phases, to better source materials given current supply constraints because of the global economic situation, and to enhance our cost efficiencies." Manufacturing was then expected to start in mid-2025, some 18 months later than initially planned.

Termination of construction of the Britishvolt factory was a contributory factor in the September 2024 collapse of ISG.

=== Financial issues ===
In September 2022, a further Guardian report said Britishvolt, facing problems that were making fundraising difficult, had called in consultancy EY to help. Sources were said to be concerned about the startup's management and talked of increasingly urgent attempts to secure financial support. The Financial Times noted the business was spending £3M a month on salaries after hiring almost 300 people while still years from generating revenue; "profligate spending" included provision of expensive electric company cars, a hospitality suite at the Goodwood Festival of Speed motorsport event, "prolific" private jet use, video yoga lessons from a fitness instructor, and top-of-the-range curved 4K computer monitors. Published accounts covering the 14 months to January 2021 showed a loss of £8.8M, warning of "material uncertainties that may cast significant doubt on the company’s ability to continue as a going concern", and government supporters rated Britishvolt's chances of survival at 50-50.

On 2 November 2022, the UK government refused to advance £30M of its grant funding to Britishvolt (release of funds was contingent on reaching construction milestones), putting the company at risk of going into administration (Britishvolt held two meetings with the UK government, chaired by former business secretaries Jacob Rees-Mogg and Grant Shapps at the Department for Business and Trade, in October and November 2022). The company then secured short-term funds lasting for several weeks on the same day. As the company urgently sought a new buyer or major investor, Glencore reportedly provided less than £5M, sufficient to keep the company going for just five weeks. The executive team was also set to work unpaid while other staff agreed voluntary pay cuts, receiving 25% or 50% of their salaries in November. Britishvolt said it was "continuing to pursue positive ongoing discussions with potential investors". The company was said to need a buyer within five weeks. Two weeks later, receivers were appointed for a Britishvolt subsidiary, and by the end of November 2022, the company was reported to have abandoned its ambitions to build a second factory in Canada; Philippe Couillard had ceased working for Britishvolt in October 2022.

In January 2023, the company was the target of two rival rescue bids. On 10 January, the Guardian reported Britishvolt was in talks with an Indonesia-linked investor consortium about a £160M rescue deal to avoid administration. The consortium (led by a UK-based private equity investor, DeaLab Group, and an associated metals business, Barracuda Group), would pay £30M for 95% of the business - a far cry from its previous $1bn (£820M) valuation - leaving current shareholders (including Nadjari, Glencore and Ashtead) with 5% of the business worth under £2M. The consortium would then invest £128M to fund the next stage in Britishvolt's development. The FT then reported that three shareholders had tabled a matching bid that valued the company marginally higher. The takeover bids were to be discussed by Britishvolt's board on 13 January.

==== Administration ====
Ahead of a Britishvolt staff meeting on 16 January 2023, the BBC reported that "a British consortium" might make a last minute bid, adding, if no bidder secured 75% of shareholder support, the company might be heading for administration. It reported UK government views that it might be preferable for the company to collapse into administration so that more serious players might take the project on. The following day, 17 January 2023, Britishvolt went into administration, with most of its 300 staff immediately made redundant (i.e. laid off). The company's board was believed to have decided there were no viable bids to keep the company afloat, and appointed EY as administrators (an unsecured creditor, EY had previously earned millions of pounds in consultancy fees from Britishvolt, and was criticised for its dual roles in the administration process, earning around £3.5M in fees as administrator). The company reportedly owed up to £120M to creditors when it collapsed, a figure later revised upwards to £160M. As a shareholder, the Ashtead plant hire firm later revealed it took a £35M hit from Britishvolt's collapse; NG Bailey reportedly lost "more than £2M", later confirmed as £6.8M. The acquisition of Monbat's German battery businesses also collapsed due to Britishvolt's insolvency.

Following the administration announcement, several companies, including Glencore and Jaguar Land Rover owner Tata Motors, expressed interest in buying Britishvolt's Blyth factory site - regarded, with its deepwater port and access to clean energy and rail links, as ideal for a large-scale battery factory. To be eligible for the government's pledged £100M grant for the project, any preferred bidder would be required to build a battery manufacturing plant and have at least £150M of working capital.

On 24 January 2023, a non-binding offer for Britishvolt was made by Geelong, Australia-based startup Recharge Industries (a subsidiary of Scale Facilitation Partners LLC), which had earlier partnered with North America's lithium-ion battery technology company C4V, a partner in the USA's first gigafactory, and which was also planning a Geelong gigafactory to be designed by US engineering firm, Jacobs. EY administrators, originally expected to sell the business for under £10M by the end of January 2023, were also in talks with a potential private equity investor Greybull Capital. On 4 February 2023, EY was reported to be working with Recharge Industries as its preferred bidder, ahead of bids from Greybull, a group of current shareholders, and Saudi British Bank.

==== Criticism of UK government role ====
In a May 2023 interview, Britishvolt co-founder Orral Nadjari said the firm's collapse was due to government bureaucracy and delay. He told Sky News that the UK had missed a window of opportunity to build a battery industry, and said the UK government, including Rishi Sunak, was largely to blame. In August 2023, Nadjari told City AM that the UK government lacked "innovative thinking" and a "joined-up industrial strategy" to support the UK's electric vehicle industry.

=== Takeover by Recharge Industries ===
On 26 February 2023, Recharge Industries announced it had bought Britishvolt out of administration; the company was sold for £8.6M. Instead of automotive batteries, Scale Facilitation CEO David Collard (once, at 32, PwC's youngest ever partner in its New York headquarters, (Note: Collard's claim to be PwC's youngest ever partner, and the circumstances of his departure from PwC, have been disputed.) and also involved in cannabis and PPE deals) said Britishvolt planned to initially focus on batteries for energy storage, making these available by the end of 2025, with batteries for high-performance sports cars to follow later. One of Recharge's strengths was its existing relationship with American lithium-ion battery developer C4V, removing the need to develop new technology, and its access to Australian minerals including lithium. Collard said factory construction at Blyth would resume in six to 12 months, but the site would ultimately create up to 8,000 jobs on site and in the supply chain.

The FT reported that the takeover related to Britishvolt's battery technology and that it had until the end of March 2023 to close a rumoured £10M deal to buy the Blyth site and pay a creditor (Katch Fund Solutions) whose debt is secured against the land. On 17 March 2023, Northumberland County Council extended a buy-back clause on the Blyth site, giving Britishvolt's new owners more time to build the gigafactory. On 31 March 2023, the FT reported that Recharge Industries' attempt to buy the factory site might collapse due to a dispute over a National Grid power supply contract, but by late April the company was understood to have completed power and energy deals for the site. However, discussions regarding the county council's buy-back clause continued beyond mid-May 2023.

In June 2023, Collard told the Australian Financial Review that the British plant was being prioritised ahead of Recharge's Geelong factory, aiming to start UK battery manufacture as early as 2024. Former Britishvolt executive Tony Laydon had been hired to get the British project operational within 12 months, and Recharge had signed a deal with Tritax Management that would save £1 billion ($1.9 billion) from the project’s estimated £3 billion-plus longer-term cost. Britishvolt had also approached former chairman and owner Peter Rolton for the Chief Operating Officer role. However, Recharge UK had yet to agree a deal with the county council regarding its buy-back rights, which was delaying finalisation of the project's financing.

In late June 2023, the offices of Scale Facilitation and SaniteX, owned by Collard, were raided by Australian police in connection with alleged tax fraud. Company sources said the tax raid was due to a misunderstanding relating to US and Australian tax filings. Insiders said Recharge staff wages in Australia had been paid two weeks late. Funding to complete the purchase of the Blythe site was expected in the next two to four weeks, with Recharge expected to be a minor shareholder in a new company (North East Gigafactory Development LLP) with Tritax and Abrdn owning the majority. However, uncertainty continued to surround the deal, as Scale Facilitation needed just under £10M to buy the site before it could close the deal with Tritax and unlock a £45M payment ("They need the money before they can buy the land and they need the land before they can get the money," an insider said). Scale Facilitation also suffered a reported "exodus" of senior staff. In August 2023, it was reported that Recharge Industries had yet to pay the final instalment of an £8.6m payment, due in April 2023, to complete its purchase of Britishvolt. A Recharge spokeswoman said the final instalment depended on a funding facility - due in August - which would provide extra cash for the project. The August 2023 deadline passed without a payment being made, while Recharge Industries was also being pursued in Australia over a $75,000 debt related to hospitality at Geelong Football Club and for monies owed to Geelong's Deakin University.

In late October 2023, the BBC reported that a deal to secure the Blyth site was "close", with Recharge set to pay EY £2.5m in outstanding fees and to pay £11m to property investor Katch. Recharge was also reportedly planning to supply batteries for Australian military vehicles through an Australian energy firm, EDEA. However, Northumberland County Council had doubts about Recharge's ability to deliver on its plan and retained an option to repurchase the site in December 2024 if no substantial progress on developing the site had been made. In early November 2023, the BBC and FT reported that Britishvolt had failed to pay its UK staff for the last four months; the FT said staff warned the business may be "trading while insolvent", and noted the receiver of the Blyth site was talking to other parties about buying the land, with Recharge no longer seen as a credible buyer.

A further FT report in November 2023 revealed that repeated Collard promises of investment in Scale Facilitation and Recharge had never materialised. He was named in New York lawsuits from staff demanding back pay, and had received an eviction notice from a luxury apartment, and an American Express bill for $746,000. One former senior employee said of the January 2023 decision to bid for Britishvolt: "It was a madman's call, we obviously didn't have the money." A due diligence report for Northumberland County Council by Grant Thornton into Collard and his businesses had raised multiple "red flags" over Collard's ability to raise financing.

In December 2023, the administration of Britishvolt was extended by EY as final payments for the firm, due in August, remained unpaid.

In New York City in January 2024, Collard was arrested and charged over allegations of assault and harassment relating to an alleged incident on Madison Avenue on 15 November 2023. Collard was earlier also reportedly involved in a possible VAT scam. Collard also faced a court action in New York for non-payment of a US$209,000 lease on a Rolls Royce Ghost Black. In January 2025, the Australian Federal Police recommended charges be laid against Collard, fellow director Jimmy Fatone and tax accountant Chris Scott, over an alleged $126 million tax fraud.

In February 2024, administrators EY said there had been "discussions with a number of additional parties who ... may be interested in acquiring the proposed gigafactory site in Northumberland." Recharge Industries "continues to remain in default of the Business Sale Agreement".

In March 2024, Recharge UK faced a winding-up petition brought by a former board director, Tom Cowling. The company was ordered to pay a former employee almost £170,000 of unpaid wages by an employment tribunal in December 2023, and over £71,000 to another ex-employee in January 2024. In June 2024, a High Court judge ordered Recharge Production UK be shut down following Cowling's petition.

In November 2024, administrators moved Britishvolt to a creditors' voluntary liquidation.

=== Factory site sale ===
In April 2024, Britishvolt's site in Blyth was acquired for £110 million by a subsidiary of the private equity Blackstone Group which intended to use the Cambois site for one of the largest data centres in Western Europe, ending hopes for thousands of manufacturing jobs in the region. Blackstone proposed to buy the site for about £20 million for its data centre business, QTS, if Northumberland County Council amended its buy-back rights (agreed on 23 April 2024), followed by phased payments of up to £110 million to the council once planning and power had been secured, leases signed and construction completed. Plans submitted in December 2024 envisaged development of a campus of up to 10 data centre buildings totalling up to 540,000sq m, representing an investment of up to £10bn, with 1,200 long-term construction jobs plus employment in the data centres.
