= Rito Seco Creek Culvert =

- U.S. National Register of Historic Places
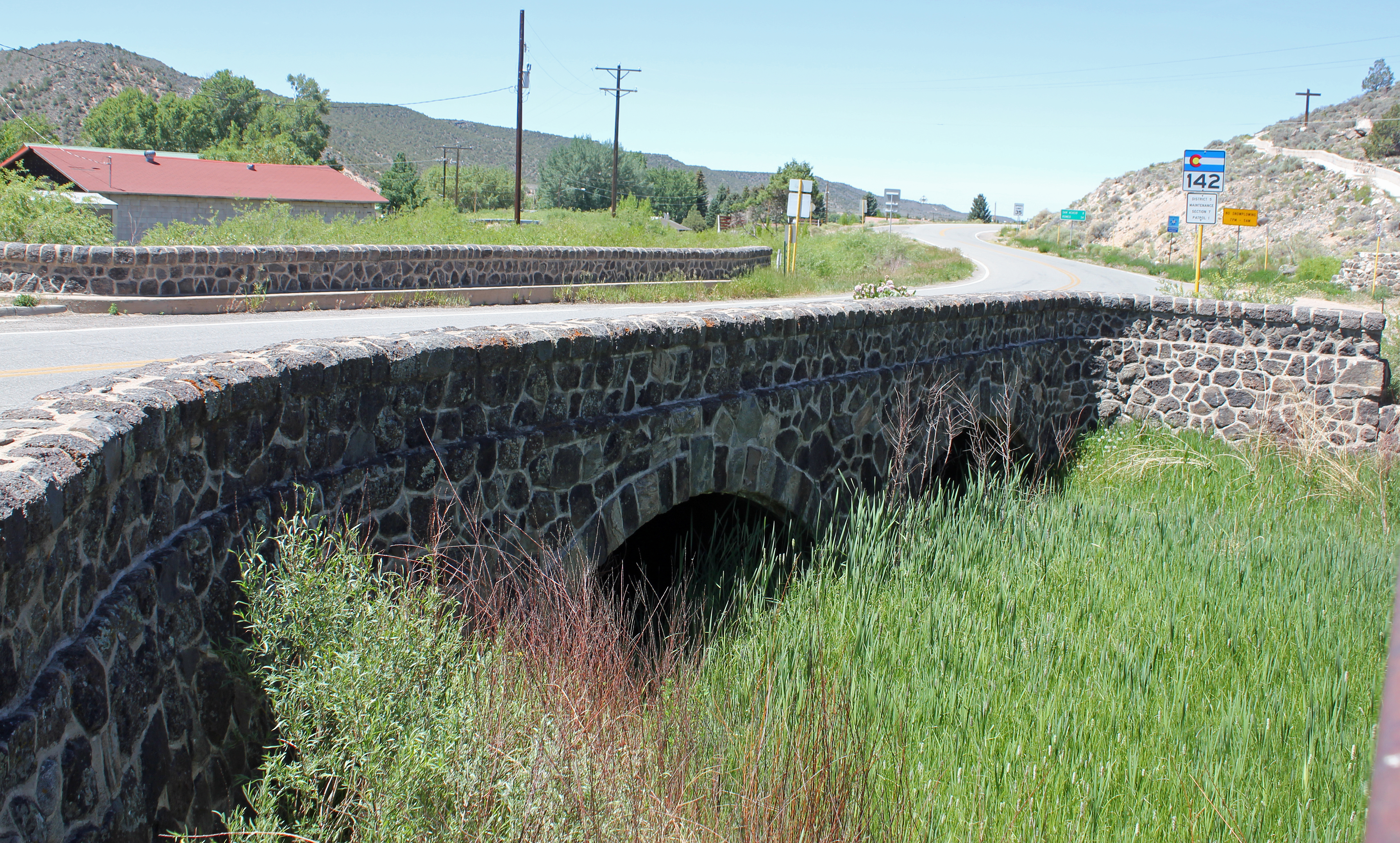

- Location within Colorado
- Location: SH 142 at milepost 33.81, San Luis, Colorado
- Coordinates: 37°12′00″N 105°25′34″W
- Area: less than one acre
- Built: 1936
- Built by: Works Progress Administration
- Architect: Colorado Department of Highways
- Architectural style: Multiplate arch
- MPS: Highway Bridges in Colorado MPS
- NRHP reference No.: 02001146
- Added to NRHP: October 15, 2002

The Rito Seco Creek Culvert, in San Luis, Colorado, was built as a Works Progress Administration project. Rito Seco flows through the culvert. It was listed on the National Register of Historic Places in 2002.
