= Sangre de Cristo Land Grant =

Coordinates: 37°12′N 105°26′W

The Sangre de Cristo Land Grant in the San Luis Valley of southern Colorado and northern New Mexico consists of 1,000,000 acres (4,000 km^{2}) of mostly arid land. It was awarded by the government of New Mexico to the Beaubien family in 1843. The land grant was originally settled by Hispanics from New Mexico. Since the incorporation of the area of the grant into the United States in 1848, legal disputes between the descendants of the Hispanic settlers and Anglo ranchers about ownership of and access to some of the land in the grant area have been frequent and continued into the 21st century.

== Background ==
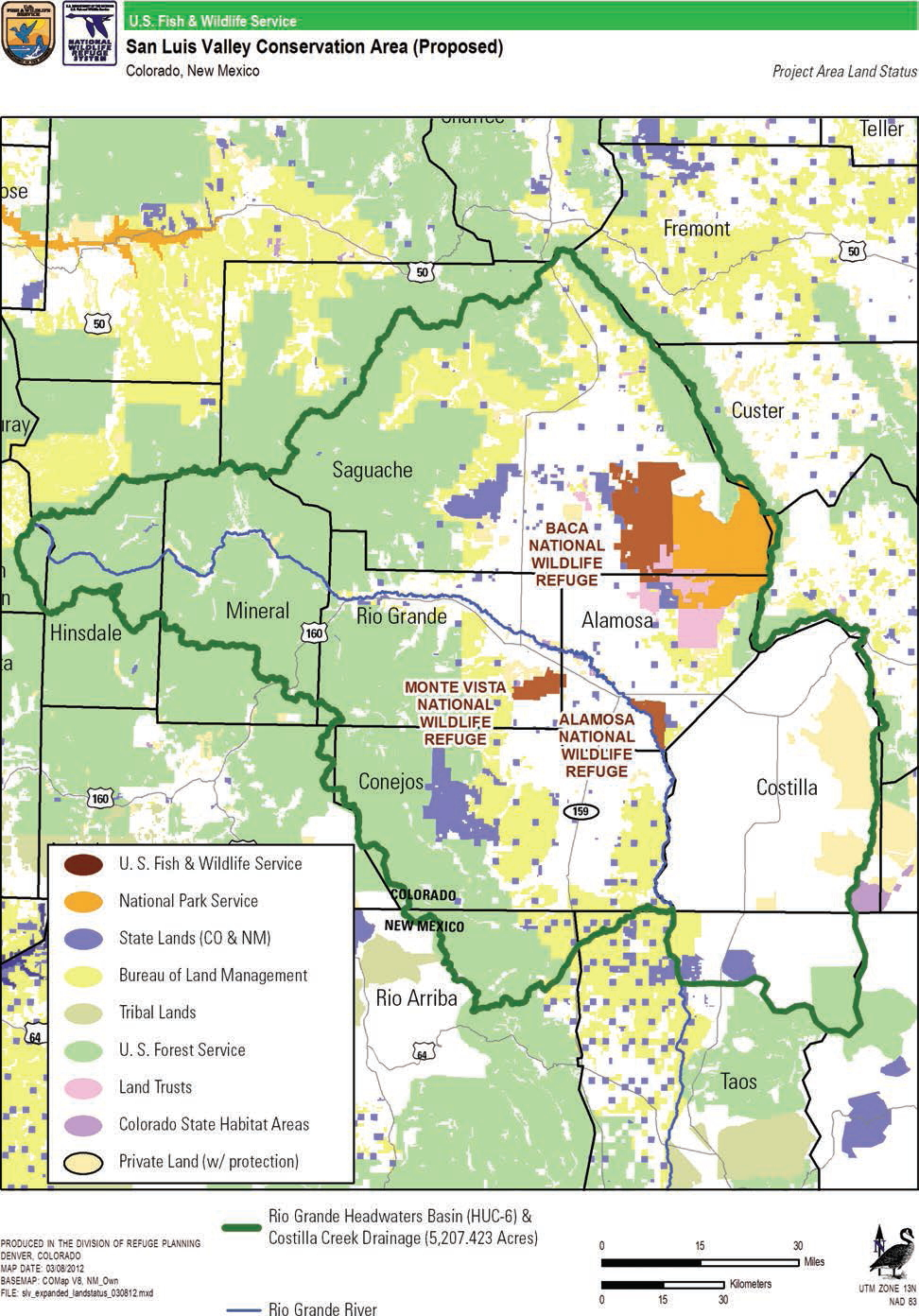
The area of the Sangre de Cristo Land Grant corresponds to Costilla County, Colorado and extends southward into New Mexico.

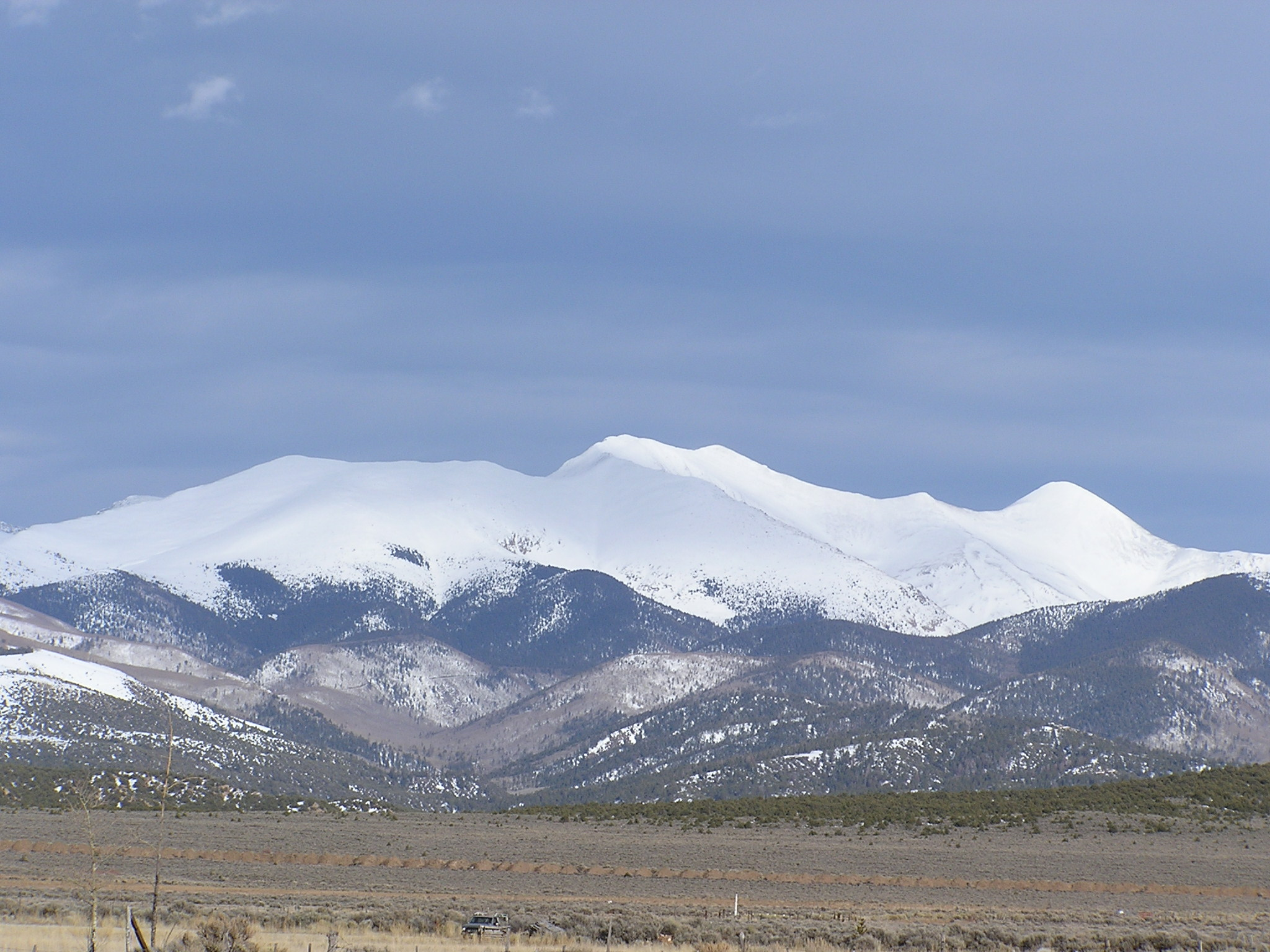
Culebra Peak, the eastern boundary of the grant. The snows of the Culebra range provide water for irrigation which makes agriculture possible in the grant area.

New Mexico was part of an independent Mexico from 1821 to 1846. During this period, especially in the 1840s, the New Mexican government granted large tracts of land to prominent individuals. The grants were intended to expand the area inhabited by Mexican citizens. Grantees had the obligation of facilitating the settlement of the land in their grants. By expanding the area inhabited by Mexicans, the grants were intended to counter the influence and presence of the United States and Anglo-Americans which had been growing since the opening of the Santa Fe Trail in 1821. Settlements in the area of the grants also had the objective of protecting the heartland of New Mexico from raids by American Indian tribes, especially the Ute on New Mexico's northern border, the Navajo on the west, and the Apache on the south. New Mexico was at peace with the Comanche on its east even though the Comanche were launching large-scale raids southward into Mexico. Expansion northward from New Mexico to what would become the area of the Sangre de Cristo grant was prevented for more than 100 years by the Ute who inhabited the San Luis Valley of what would later become the state of Colorado.

The Sangre de Cristo Land Grant is in the San Luis Valley. It is approximately 55 miles (89 km) in north-south distance from near Blanca Peak, 4,374 m (14,350 ft) in elevation, in Colorado to northern New Mexico. The grant is about 30 miles (48 km) wide. The eastern border is the crest of the Culebra Range of the Sangre de Cristo Mountains which reach an elevation at Culebra Peak of 4,283 m (14,052 ft). The western border of the grant is the Rio Grande which at the border between New Mexico and Colorado has an elevation of 2,250 m (7,380 ft). The climate of the grant lands is arid and semi-arid with less than 10 in (250 mm) of precipitation in much of the San Luis Valley. The Sangre de Cristo mountains in the east have higher precipitation and the runoff from snow melt and rainfall provides most of the water for irrigation in the valleys of the three major tributaries of the Rio Grande in the grant. From north to south, they are Trinchera Creek, the Rio Culebra, and Costilla Creek.

== The grant ==
In 1843, New Mexico governor Manuel Armijo awarded 1,000,000 acres (4,000 km^{2}) of land to Mexican citizens Narciso Beaubien and Stephen Luis Lee. The boundaries of the Sangre de Cristo Grant correspond roughly to present-day Costilla County, Colorado plus the drainage area of Costilla Creek, New Mexico. The Mexican-American War of 1846-1848 discouraged efforts of settlement on the lands of the grant. In 1847 Beaubien and Lee were killed during the Taos Revolt. Narciso's father Carlos Beaubien inherited the grant. In 1849, the United States, now in possession of former Mexican territory in New Mexico and Colorado, signed a treaty with the Ute Indians which made it possible for people in New Mexico to move northward and populate the Sangre de Cristo Grant.

In 1851, ten Hispanic settlers from Taos, New Mexico established the town of San Luis on the banks of the Rio Culebra in the Sangre de Cristo Grant. San Luis was the first permanent settlement in Colorado. In 1852, the settlers began digging what became known as the San Luis People's Ditch to irrigate farmland with the water of the Rio Culebra. The People's Ditch is 6 km (3.7 miles) long. Additional irrigation ditches, called acequias, soon crisscrossed the valley. Each settler received a narrow strip of land 25 to 100 "varas" (70 to 275 feet) wide fronting on an acequia and extending as much as 30 km (19 miles) north to south across the valley. In accordance with Spanish/Mexican practice, Beaubien established in 1863 a communal pasture (vega) in which each settler (poblador) could pasture cattle, horses, and mules. Upland areas were designated for grazing of goats, sheep, and pigs. Settlers were guaranteed access to the upland areas for grazing livestock, collecting firewood, hunting, and fishing. In 1860 the population of the Rio Culebra drainage area reached 1,700 persons.

The history of Hispanic settlements near Costilla Creek in Taos County, New Mexico is similar to that of the Rio Culebra. In the northern part of the grant, the U.S. army established Fort Massachusetts in 1852 to protect the settlers from the Ute, still sporadically hostile to the settlements. The fort was relocated in 1858 and renamed Fort Garland. Fort Garland was abandoned by the army in 1883 as the Ute had been confined to reservations and were no longer a threat to the people in the grant area.

== Struggles for land: Anglo and Hispanic ==
Competition for land and water between Hispanics and Anglos began in the 1860s and has been a constant in the Sangre de Cristo grant ever since. In 1864, Beaubien's wife sold the grant area to Colorado Territorial Governor William Gilpin. The sale document obligated Gilpin and his partners to respect the settlers' property and communal rights. In 1868, Gilpin divided the grant area into two ranches: the Trinchera Estate in the north and the Costilla Estate in the South. Gilpin and subsequent owners sold pieces of the grant area to private investors.

=== Taylor/Cielo Vista Ranch ===
The southern part of the grant was known as the Costilla Estate. For nearly 100 years, the descendants of the Hispanic settlers living in the Costilla Estate continued to have communal rights to the use of much of the land although the legal ownership of the land passed through various hands. The Hispanic descendants generally held title to the lands they used for irrigated agriculture, but exerted their rights to access larger properties, usually owned by Anglos, for grazing, timber, and other uses. In 1960 that situation changed when a North Carolina lumberman named John T. (Jack) Taylor purchased 77,000 acres (310 km^{2}) of the former Costilla Estate which became known as the Taylor Ranch. The deed provided that the local people had the right for pasture, wood, and lumber on Taylor's land. In 1963, however, Taylor began to fence the ranch, cutting off the access of the nearby residents. Protests followed with some violence.

In 1971, descendants of the heirs formed the Land Rights Council to lead the legal effort to reestablish their right to use the land. They filed a class-action lawsuit in 1981 against Taylor. Shirley Romero Otero co-founded the group and is the president of the Land Rights Council as they continue their legal efforts.

Decades of legal wrangles finally concluded in 2002 when the Colorado Supreme Court affirmed the right of the descendants of the original settlers to access and use the lands of the former Taylor Ranch, by then called the Sierra or Cielo Vista Ranch.

The issue of access to the land by the descendants of the Hispanic settlers re-ignited after businessman William Bruce Harrison purchased the Cielo Vista ranch in 2017. Harrison attempted to overturn the 2002 legal decision and limit access to the Cielo Vista ranch by the 5,000 descendants of the 19th century settlers. Negotiations between Harrison and the San Luis Land Use Council failed and in 2021 Judge Kenneth Plotz was appointed to decide the issue based on the proposals of both sides. Judge Plotz found in favor of the heirs, and once again reaffirmed their right to access the land.

=== Trinchera and Blanca Ranches ===
The northern part of the grant area, the Trinchera Estate, was divided into two ranches in 1950: the Blanca ranch in the northernmost part of the Sangre de Cristo Land Grant and the Trinchera Ranch located on the south side of Highway 160 which divides the two ranches. Businessman Malcolm Forbes purchased the Trinchera Ranch in 1969 and the Blanca Ranch in 1982 and sub-divided parts of the ranches into lots for sale. In 2004, the Forbes family donated a conservation easement of 80,000 acres (320 km^{2}) acres of the Blanca Ranch and in 2007 sold both ranches, consisting of 171,400 acres (694 km^{2}) to hedge-fund manager Louis Bacon. In 2012, Bacon confirmed the conservation easement of the Forbes Family and established an additional conservation easement of 90,000 acres (360 km^{2}) with the U.S. Fish and Wildlife Service, thus protecting both the Trinchera and Blanca ranches.

The Blanca and Trinchera Ranches have largely avoided the disputes over access characteristic of the Taylor/Cielo Vista ranch as few of the early Hispanic settlers in the grant area utilized the lands of the two ranches and therefore few persons have historic rights to access the land.
