= Rio Culebra (Colorado) =

River in Colorado

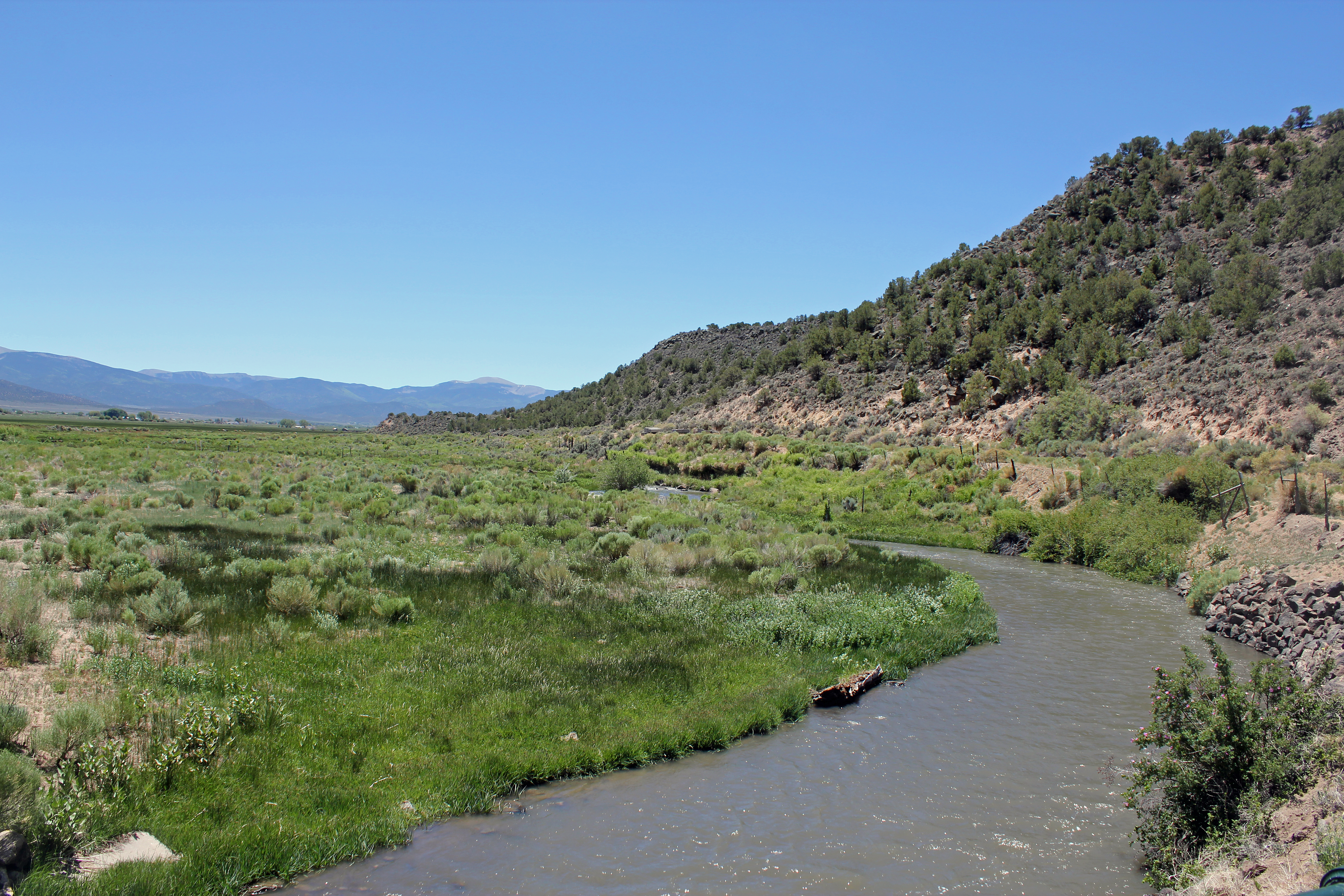
- The Rio Culebra near the town of San Luis

- Location in Colorado

Location
- Country: United States
- Location: Costilla County, Colorado

Physical characteristics
- Source
  - location: Junction of El Valle Creek and Carneros Creek
  - coordinates: 37.183°N 105.730°W
- Mouth
  - location: Rio Grande
  - coordinates: 37.180°N 105.431°W
- Length: 30 mi (48 km)

Rio Culebra (also called Culebra River, Río de la Culebra and Culebra Creek) is a river or creek in Costilla County, Colorado. The Rio Culebra rises in the Sangre de Cristo Mountains and is 48 km (30 miles) long. It empties into the Rio Grande west of the town of San Luis. The region around San Luis features extensive agriculture made possible by irrigation water from the river. Sometimes called the "Culebra Basin" this area is known for the extensive irrigation canals called acequias built by its Hispanic settlers in the 19th century and still in use in the 21st century

== Geography ==
The most distant sources of the Rio Culebra are the highest slopes of Culebra Peak, 4,283 m (14,052 ft) in elevation and De Anza Peak, 4,066 m (13,340 ft) in elevation, in the Sangre de Cristo Mountains. The Rio Culebra is formed by the union of El Valle and Carneros creeks at an elevation of 2,895 m (9,498 ft). The largest tributary of the Rio Culebra is Ventero Creek which rises in New Mexico and flows 25 km (16 miles) northward to join the main stream. Sanchez Reservoir on Ventero Creek stores water to be used downstream for irrigation. The Rio Culebra passes through the town of San Luis at an elevation of 2,432 m (7,979 ft). From San Luis the river flows eastward 27 km (17 miles) through the San Luis Valley where it joins the Rio Grande at an elevation of 2,277 m (7,470 ft). The watershed of the Rio Culebra is 920 km^{2} (360 sq mi) in area.

The climate of the watershed of the Rio Culebra is arid or semi-arid at lower elevations and most agriculture is only possible with irrigation. The town of San Luis receives an average of 244 mm (9.6 in) of precipitation annually. Precipitation increases with altitude and most of the water in the Rio Culebra comes from melted snow and rainfall received at the higher elevations of the Sangre de Cristos. A weather station near El Valle Creek at an elevation of 3,207 m (10,522 ft) received 635 mm (25.0 in) of precipitation annually on average between 1980 and 2021. Annual precipitation at the El Valle weather station varied from 295 mm (11.6 in) in the driest year (2002) to 932 mm (36.7 in) in the wettest year (1983).

The Rio Culebra is usually dry in its lower stretches due to the utilization of its water for irrigation. The amount of water for irrigation is variable from year to year depending upon precipitation and snow pack in the mountains. The median flow of the river near San Luis was 45.1 cubic feet per second (cfs) annually from 1907 to 2007. Median flow varied from 18.2 cfs in 1951 to 92.7 cfs in 1942.

== History ==
Expansion northward of the Spanish colony in New Mexico was prevented for more than 100 years by the Ute Indians who inhabited the Rio Culebra basin. The Rio Culebra basin is part of the Sangre de Cristo Land Grant awarded to the family of Carlos Beaubien in 1843. In 1850 settlers began arriving at the Rio Culebra and in 1851, ten settlers from Taos, New Mexico established the town of San Luis on the banks of the Rio Culebra, the first permanent settlement in Colorado. Hispanics established six additional villages in the watershed: San Pedro (1850), San Pablo (1852), San Acacio (1852), San Francisco (1853-54), Chama (after 1863), and Los Fuertes (?). In 1852, the settlers began digging what became known as the San Luis People's Ditch to irrigate farmland with the water of the Rio Culebra. The People's Ditch is 6 km (3.7 miles) long. Each settler received a long, narrow strip of land 25 to 100 "varas" (70 to 275 feet) wide fronting on the ditch and extending at a right angle from the ditch as much as 30 km (19 miles) across the valley. In 1860 the population of Rio Culebra area reached 1,700 persons.

In 1863, in accordance with Spanish and Mexican practice, Beaubien, a Mexican citizen of French descent, established a communal pasture ("vega") in which each settler ("poblador") could pasture four cattle, plus horses and mules. Upland areas distant from irrigation canals were designated for grazing of goats, sheep, and pigs. Settlers were guaranteed access to the upland areas for grazing livestock, collecting firewood, hunting, and fishing.

The San Luis People's Ditch was the first of a dozen acequias (irrigation ditches) constructed by 1874. In 1986, 83 acequias were utilizing the water of the Rio Culebra and its tributaries. The population of Costilla county peaked in 1940 when 600 to 700 farm families occupied the Rio Culebra watershed; in 2003 that number had declined to 270 families who irrigated 24,000 acres (9,700 ha) of crop and pasture land.

The ownership and use of the lands in the basin of the Rio Culebra have been the subject of legal disputes beginning in the 1860s and continuing into the 21st century. Descendants of the original Hispanic settlers have asserted their rights to use formerly common lands for grazing, wood-gathering, and other uses. Anglo owners have attempted, mostly unsuccessfully, to restrict or eliminate those rights.

== See also ==
- List of rivers of Colorado
- https://www.youtube.com/watch?v=ukO287q89MM Colorado Voices: Acequias of the Rio Culebra, PBS
