= Gigafactory =

Gigafactory is a massive industrial facility designed for the large-scale production of electric vehicles (EVs), lithium-ion batteries, and battery energy storage solutions. It's a neologism introduced by electric vehicle manufacturer Tesla in 2013 to refer to the company's first major manufacturing facility outside of the original Tesla Fremont Factory in California. At the time the facility was going to be called "Gigafactory" and no location had been chosen. The completed facility is now called Gigafactory Nevada (or Gigafactory 1) because Tesla has now constructed several other large facilities in multiple countries.

For the first gigafactory, Tesla partnered with Panasonic to produce battery cells at the same facility where the vehicles would be manufactured, creating economies of scale and improving control of the battery supply chain. By locating two major manufacturing facilities within the same structure, Gigafactory Nevada notably became the second-largest building in the world (by volume) once construction was complete.

More recent Tesla factories such as Gigafactory Berlin produce battery cells, battery packs, electric drivetrains, and other components which are incorporated into finished electric vehicle assemblies at the same facility using advanced robotics. This level of vertical integration allows Tesla to produce vehicles more quickly and reduce its exposure to supply chain problems. Conversely Gigafactory New York produces photovoltaic cells and Tesla Supercharger assemblies but does not produce batteries or vehicles, broadening usage of the term.

The term "gigafactory" has also been adopted by other companies which are involved in the manufacture of electric vehicles and other clean tech products. Established automobile manufacturers such as Jaguar Land Rover and Volkswagen now use the term to refer to their own electric vehicle factories. Newer companies such as Stellantis have also embraced the term by referring to four new "gigafactories" in France which will produce lithium-ion batteries for electric vehicles. Other companies such as Holosolis and 3Sun, which only produce solar cells and finished solar panel assemblies, also use the term "gigafactory" to refer to their facilities.

== Tesla Gigafactories ==
Gigafactory may specifically refer to the following Tesla factories:

- Gigafactory Nevada in Storey County, Nevada, United States
- Gigafactory New York in Buffalo, New York, United States
- Gigafactory Shanghai in Shanghai, China
- Gigafactory Berlin-Brandenburg in Grünheide (Mark), Germany
- Gigafactory Texas in Austin, Texas, United States
- Gigafactory Mexico proposed factory in Santa Catarina, Nuevo León, Mexico

== See also ==
- Verkor
- Northvolt
- Britishvolt
- Tesla Factory, in Fremont, California, U.S.
- Tesla facilities in Tilburg, Netherlands
