= Blanca Wetlands =

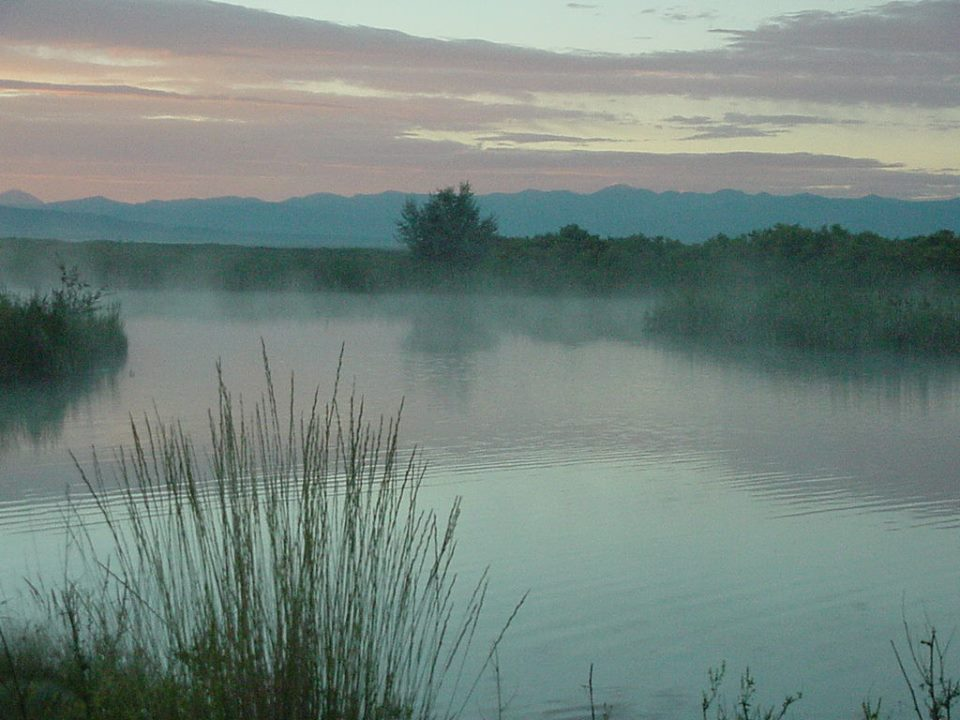

- Location within Colorado
- Location: San Luis Valley
- Nearest city: Alamosa, Colorado
- Coordinates: 37.547844°N 105.687301°W
- Area: 10,000 acres (4,000 ha)
- Established: 1965
- Governing body: Bureau of Land Management

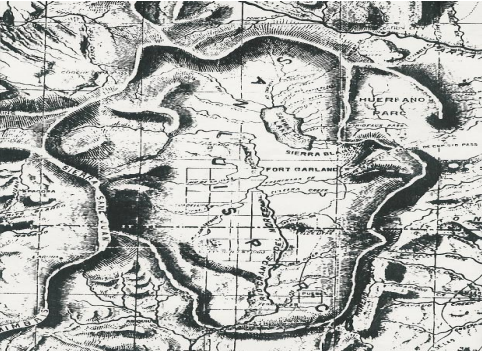
1869 Map of San Luis Parc of Colorado and Northern New Mexico. "Sawatch Lake" at the east of the San Luis Valley is in the closed basin. The Blanca Wetlands are at the south end of the lake.

The Blanca Wetlands Area of Critical Environmental Concern, or Blanca Wildlife Habitat Area, is an area of the San Luis Valley in Colorado, United States, that serves as a refuge for birds, fish and other wildlife. It is about 11 miles (18 km) northeast of Alamosa on County Road 25. The wetlands had been completely destroyed by pumping and diversion of water for irrigation. Starting in 1965, the Bureau of Land Management began to restore them, and they have become an increasingly important ecological habitat for shorebirds, waterbirds and other wildlife and native plants.

== Location ==
The region has a cool, dry climate, with about 107 frost-free days each year. Temperatures range from −30 °F (−34 °C) to 85 °F (29 °C). Annual rainfall is about 7 inches (180 mm). The landscape is flat. Sand dunes carry sparse vegetation such as greasewood, rubber rabbit, salt grass, sandhill muhly and sand dropseed. The areas of dunes are intermingled with depressions and basins of historical playas. As late as the 1800s, the area was wet, and the bones of fish show that some of the water was at least 12 feet (3.7 m) deep. Loss of water and destruction of wetlands occurred in the twentieth century due to pumping and redirecting surface water for irrigation. By the mid-1900s, the basins had completely dried up, and the area became known as "Dry Lakes".

In 1965, the San Luis Resource Area of the Bureau of Land Management began a project to restore some of the dry playas in the San Luis Valley to their former condition as wetlands. The Blanca Wildlife Habitat Area covers almost 10,000 acres (4,000 ha) south of San Luis Lakes and near to the Great Sand Dunes National Park and Preserve. In contains about two hundred shallow basins floored by layers of sand and clay, holding wet meadows, salt flats, marshes and fresh water ponds. As of 1989, the Habitat Area contained 1,400 acres (570 ha) of pond and wetlands, with another 475 acres (192 ha) of historical wetlands to be developed Wetland vegetation in the playas includes softstem bulrush, cattail, alkaline bulrush, spike rush, sago pondweed, longleaf pondweed and watermilfoil. About 1,200 acres (490 ha) are watered each year, while other parts are deliberately allowed to dry up.

== Administration ==
The Blanca Wildlife Habitat Area has been designated as an official mitigation site for wetland losses that have been caused by construction and operation of the Closed Basin Project by the Bureau of Reclamation. The Bureau of Land Management undertakes habitat restoration and preservation in the wetlands in partnership with the Colorado Division of Wildlife, United States Fish and Wildlife Service, United States Bureau of Reclamation, Ducks Unlimited, National Fish and Wildlife Foundation and other organizations. The wetlands have been identified as an Area of Critical Environmental Concern. They are closed to the public from mid-February to mid-July to avoid disturbing nesting birds. At other times of the year the wetlands are open for activities such as fishing, waterfowl hunting and bird watching.

As of February 2012, the Bureau of Land Management was asking for input from the public on a proposal to expand the Blanca Wetlands Area of Critical Environmental Concern.

== Wildlife ==
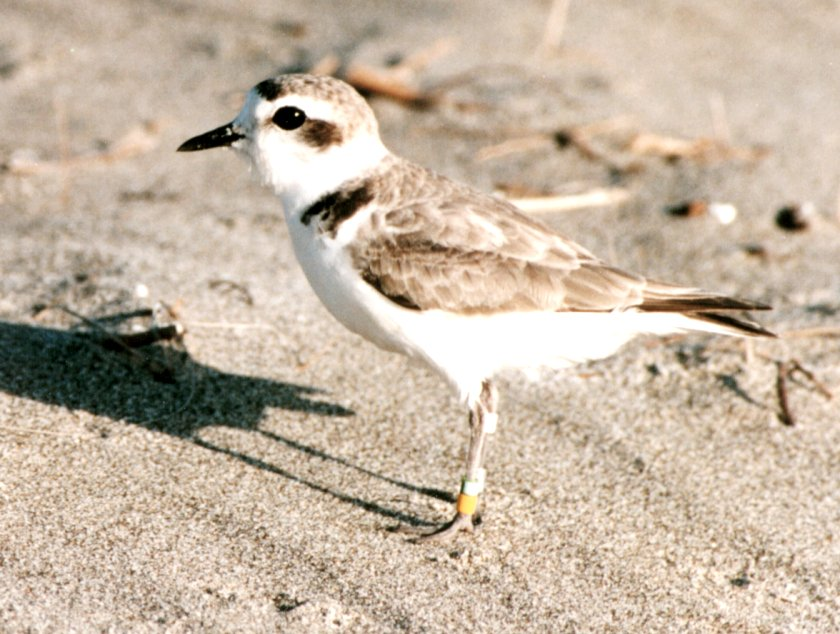
Snowy plover

The wetlands is one of the most important areas for birds in Colorado since it provides habitat for migrating waterbirds or shorebirds. It hosts thirteen threatened, endangered and sensitive species. The bald eagle and the peregrine falcon use the wetlands. The snowy plover and the white-faced ibis have been documented as nesting. Other Species of Management Priority that have been documented are American bittern, avocet, common yellowthroat, eared grebe, Forster's tern, greater sandhill crane, hen harrier, Savannah sparrow, snowy egret, sora rail, western grebe and yellow-headed blackbird. Shorebirds such as gulls, sandpipers and pelicans are at home in the salty environment, as well as 158 other species. There is a breeding population of snowy plover. The wetlands is a duck breeding concentration area, with mallards by far the most common, but good numbers of pintail and green-winged teal also visiting.

The wetlands could become critical for conserving amphibians in the valley. There is a healthy population of Great Plains toads. Other documented amphibians include the plains spadefoot toad, western chorus frog, leopard frog and tiger salamander. There are several species of bat in the wetlands. The least chipmunk is common in the greasewood parks that adjoin the wetlands and the Ord's kangaroo rat lives in the sand dunes. Muskrats and coyotes are present, and mule deer and elk are often seen in the wetland area.

== Water supply ==
Some of the water from the Closed Basin Project, which mainly collects groundwater for irrigation in the Rio Grande valley, is delivered to the Blanca Wildlife Habitat Area. However, the total amount of water from the project delivered to the Alamosa National Wildlife Refuge and the Blanca Wildlife Habitat Area is limited to 5,300 acre-feet (6,500,000 m^{3}) per year. In 2006, the Habitat Area received 950 acre-feet (1,170,000 m^{3}). In addition to this water they receive the output from over forty artesian wells. To supplement this, in December 2007, the Bureau of Land Management said it was considering exchanging up to 2,700 acres (1,100 ha) of land in Rio Grande County in exchange for the rights to 190 acre-feet (230,000 m^{3}) of water from the Anderson Ditch in Monte Vista. A developer who was converting land irrigated by the Anderson Ditch no longer needed the water rights since they were converting their land to residential use.

The Bureau of Land Management is required to maintain "mitigation acres" to offset the impact of the Closed Basin Project. In 2010, the Bureau of Land Management was reviewing plans for large-scale drying of the wetlands, coupled with irrigating the adjacent South San Luis Lakes to the north. Drying is a management tool that mimics natural processes and supports crucial ecological processes such as plant succession and removal of salts from the system. To do so on a large scale the water tables must be lowered enough to have the full effect. The proposed area to be irrigated lies between the Blanca Wetlands ACEC and the San Luis State Park, and would allow species to migrate between wetlands in the state park and the Blanca wetlands.
