= Blanca, Colorado =

Statutory town in Costilla County, Colorado, United States

- statutory town
- Town of Blanca
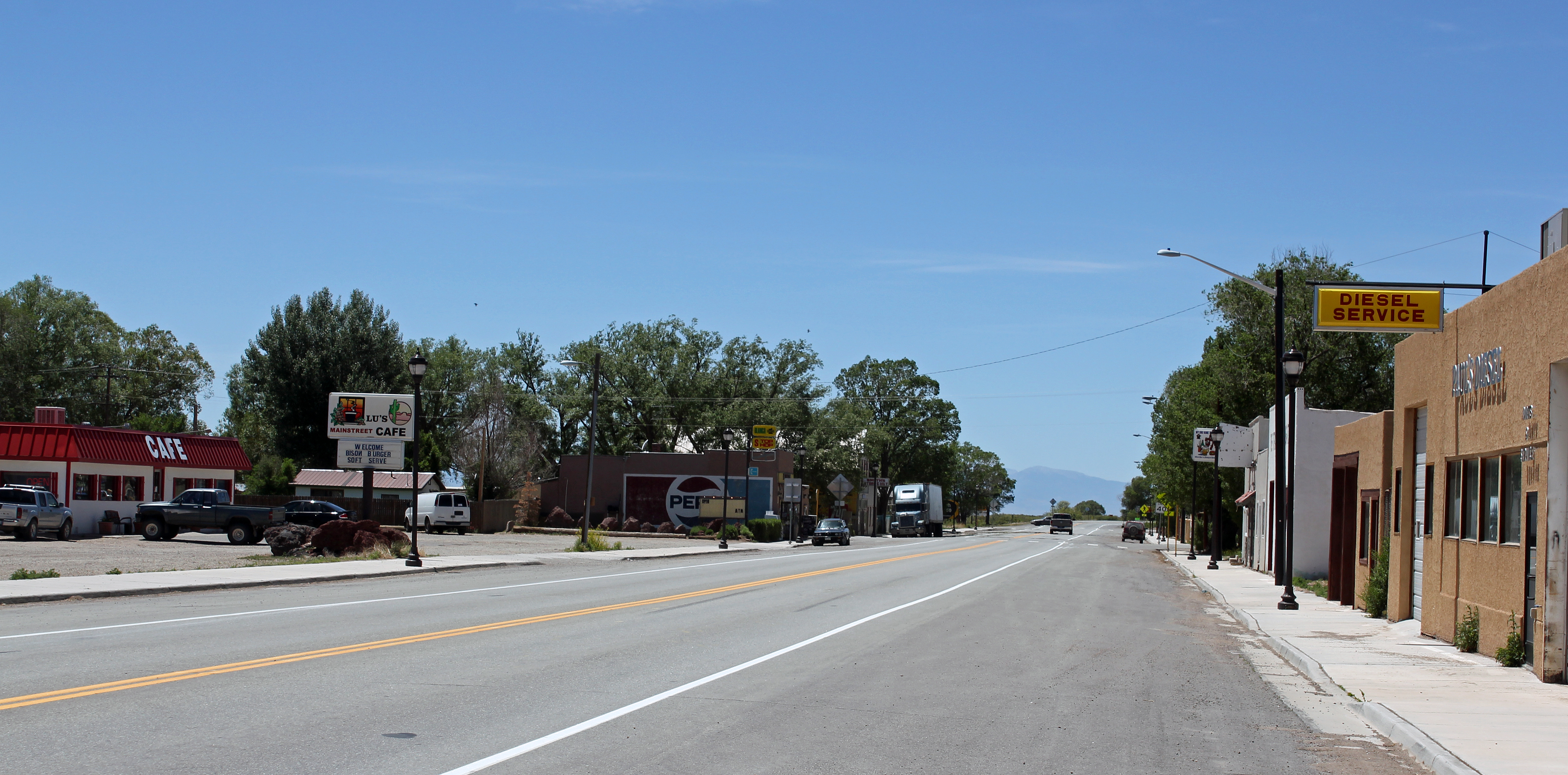
- Main Street, looking west

- Location of the Town of Blanca in Costilla County, Colorado.

- Location of the Town of Blanca, Colorado. Blanca (Colorado)
- Coordinates: 37.4381°N 105.5158°W
- Country: United States
- State: Colorado
- County: Costilla
- Incorporated (town): September 7, 1900

Government
  - Type: statutory town

Area
  - Total: 1.833 sq mi (4.747 km^{2})
  - Land: 1.833 sq mi (4.747 km^{2})
  - Water: 0 sq mi (0.000 km^{2})
- Elevation: 7,756 ft (2,364 m)

Population (2020)
  - Total: 322
  - Density: 176/sq mi (68/km^{2})
- Time zone: UTC−07:00 (MST)
  - Summer (DST): UTC−06:00 (MDT)
- ZIP code: 81123
- Area code: 719
- GNIS pop ID: 203627
- GNIS town ID: 2411696
- FIPS code: 08-07190
- Website: Town of Blanca

Blanca is a statutory town located in Costilla County, Colorado, United States. The town population was 322 at the 2020 census. Blanca is located in the enormous San Luis Valley.

== History ==
The Blanca, Colorado, post office opened on October 5, 1894. Blanca is named for Blanca Peak, A land lottery in August 1908 spurred growth. The Town of Blanca was incorporated on May 18, 1910.

In the mid-1990s Polish settlers set up shop at the Red Rocks General Store selling liquor, beer, polish sausages, and other eastern European goods. Blanca is the region's main supplier of bilberry syrup. Blanca is known for elk hunting and alpine trout fishing.

== Geography ==
Blanca is located in the east of the San Luis Valley and northern Costilla County. The town lies along U.S. Route 160, 20 miles (32 km) east of Alamosa and 52 miles (84 km) west of Walsenburg.

At the 2020 United States census, the town had an area of 1,173 acres (4.747 km^{2}), all of it land.

The region has a cool, dry climate, with 107 frost-free days each year. Temperatures range from −30 °F (−34 °C) to 85 °F (29 °C). Annual rainfall is about 7 inches (180 mm).

In areas not irrigated, dunes carry sparse vegetation such as greasewood, rubber rabbitbrush, salt grass, sandhill muhly and sand dropseed. The dunes are intermingled with depressions and basins of historical playas. The Blanca Wetlands, an Area of Critical Environmental Concern, lies northwest of the town. The wetlands receive groundwater for irrigation from the Closed Basin Project, which delivers groundwater to the Rio Grande.

== Demographics ==
Historical population
Census	Pop.	Note	%±
1920	380		—
1930	252		−33.7%
1940	407		61.5%
1950	376		−7.6%
1960	233		−38.0%
1970	212		−9.0%
1980	252		18.9%
1990	272		7.9%
2000	391		43.8%
2010	385		−1.5%
2020	322		−16.4%
U.S. Decennial Census

As of the census of 2000, there were 391 people, 142 households, and 105 families in the town. The population density was 219.6 inhabitants per square mile (84.8/km^{2}). There were 183 housing units at an average density of 102.8 units per square mile (39.7 units/km^{2}). The racial makeup was 53.45% White, 0.77% African American, 1.28% Native American, 2.81% Asian, 39.64% from other races, and 2.05% from two or more races. Hispanic or Latino of any race were 67.01%.

There were 142 households, of which 35.2% had children under 1, 63.4% were married couples living together, 7.7% a female householder with no husband present, and 25.4% were non-families. 21.1% of households were of individuals and 9.9% had someone living alone who was 65 or older. The average household size was 2.75 and the average family size 3.26.

In the town, the population was 27.9% under 18, 8.2% from 18 to 24, 27.9% from 25 to 44, 21.7% from 45 to 64, and 14.3% 65 or older. The median age was 37. For every 100 females, there were 106.9 males. For every 100 females 18 and over, there were 102.9 males.

The median income for a household in the town was $22,875, and the median income for a family $22,411. Males had a median income of $20,125 versus $15,833 for females. The per capita income for the town was $10,200. About 19.5% of families and 21.6% of the population were below the poverty line, including 29.1% of those under 18 and 11.3% of those 65 or over.

== See also ==
- Blanca Peak
- List of municipalities in Colorado
- List of populated places in Colorado
- List of post offices in Colorado
- San Luis Valley
