= San Luis Valley Conservation Area =

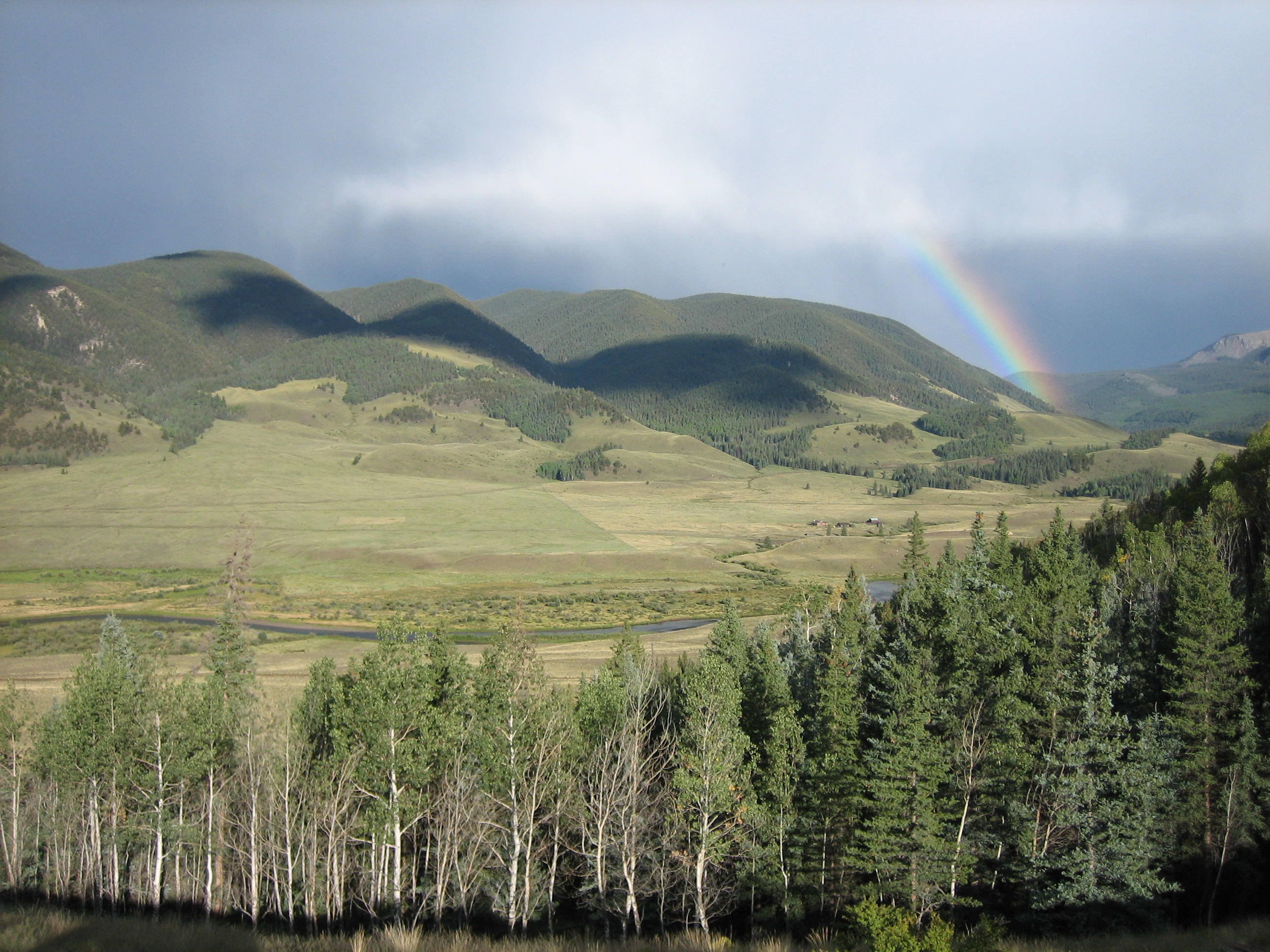
- The upper Rio Grande near Creede

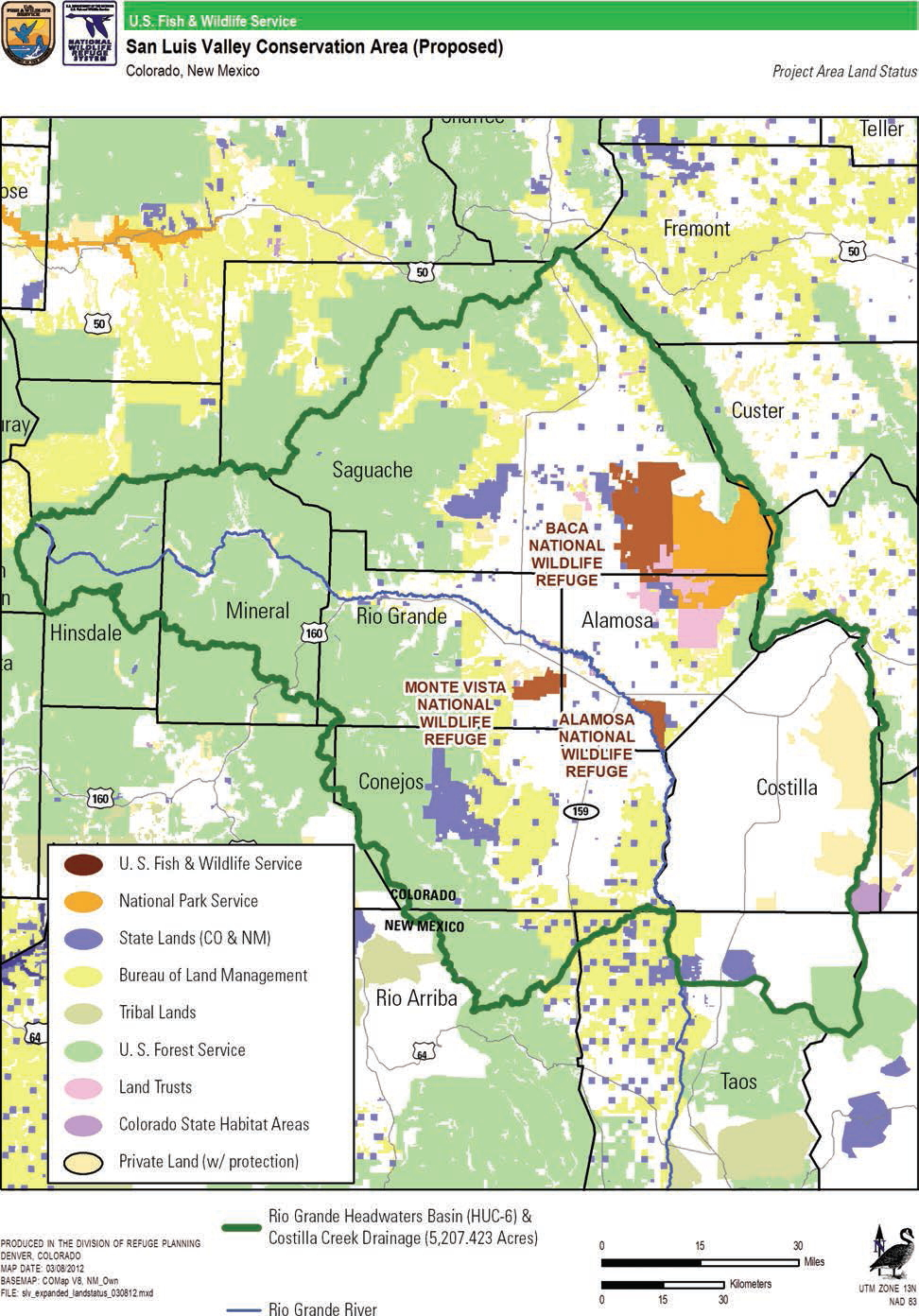
- The San Luis Valley Conservation Area showing federal, state, and protected land use
- Nearest city: Alamosa, Colorado
- Coordinates: 37°44′N 106°02′W
- Established: September 14, 2018

The San Luis Valley Conservation Area, established in September 2018, a "landscape scale"National Conservation Area in south-central Colorado and far northern New Mexico which administered by the U.S. Fish and Wildlife Service:

- The area, comprising the San Luis Valley and the upper basin of the Rio Grande, would become the fifth unit of the San Luis Valley National Wildlife Refuge Complex.
- Potential land protection of up to 1,216,000 acres (492,000 ha) with conservation easements bought from willing sellers.
- Limited fee-title acquisition of up to 30,000 acres (12,000 ha) to meet management needs of the Alamosa, Baca, and Monte Vista National Wildlife Refuges.
- Planning for this conservation area was part of developing the comprehensive conservation plan for the refuges in the San Luis Valley.

The proposal was promoted and strongly supported by Ken Salazar, United States Secretary of the Interior in the Obama administration. Secretary Salazar is a Hispanic San Luis Valley native with a ranching background in Conejos County, Colorado.

Public meetings on the draft proposal were held by the Fish and Wildlife Service in May, 2012 in Alamosa, San Luis, and Moffat, Colorado and comments solicited.

The draft plan focused on maintaining wetlands and riparian habitats in the high desert mountain valley. The plan was criticized by the Rio Grande Water Conservation District, which represents local water users, as limiting the flexibility needed to manage agricultural water use in the San Luis Valley needed to balance the water budget.

The conservation area is defined by the headwaters of the Rio Grande, which begins its nearly 1,900-mile (3,100 km) journey to the Gulf of Mexico in the San Juan Mountains and Sangre de Cristo Range that surround the San Luis Valley. Runoff from mountain snowpack creates wetlands and riparian areas in the midst of what otherwise is a high-mountain desert, providing important habitat for dozens of species of migratory birds and other sensitive or imperiled species. The surrounding sagebrush shrublands and mountains provide homes and migration corridors for the Rio Grande cutthroat trout, Canada lynx, and important State game species such as elk and deer.

Conservation easement contracts specify perpetual protection of habitat for trust species and limits on residential, industrial, or commercial development. Contracts would prohibit alteration of the natural topography, conversion of native grassland to cropland, and drainage or filling of wetlands. When appropriate, easement contracts would prevent the sale of surface water rights or change in water use that would have substantial negative effects on the wildlife value of the property. Easement land would remain in private ownership. Therefore, property tax and invasive plant control would remain the responsibility of the landowner, who also would retain control of public access to the land. Contracts would not restrict grazing on easement land.
