= Fort Garland, Colorado =

Census-designated place in Costilla County, Colorado, United States

- census-designated place
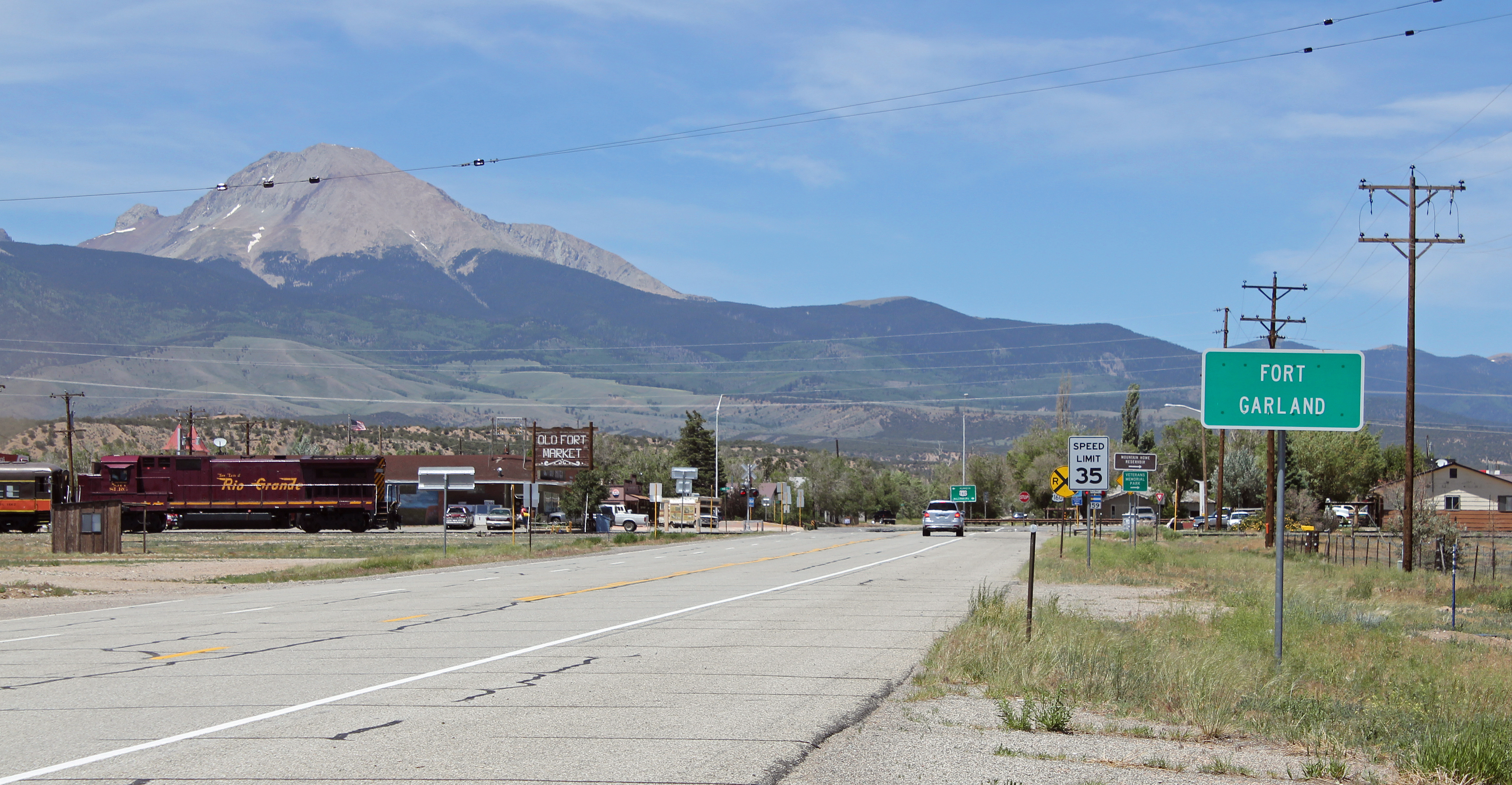
- Fort Garland from the south.
- Nickname: "Gateway to the San Luis Valley"
- Location of the Fort Garland CDP in Costilla County, Colorado.

- Location of the Fort Garland CDP, Colorado. Fort Garland (Colorado)
- Coordinates: 37.4289°N 105.4339°W
- Country: United States
- State: Colorado
- County: Costilla
- Established: 1858

Government
  - Type: unincorporated community
  - Body: Costilla County

Area
  - Total: 0.376 sq mi (0.973 km^{2})
  - Land: 0.376 sq mi (0.973 km^{2})
  - Water: 0 sq mi (0 km^{2})
- Elevation: 7,943 ft (2,421 m)

Population (2020)
  - Total: 464
  - Density: 1,240/sq mi (477/km^{2})
- Time zone: UTC−07:00 (MST)
  - Summer (DST): UTC−06:00 (MDT)
- ZIP code: 81133
- Area code: 719
- GNIS place ID: 192831
- GNIS town ID: 2408238
- FIPS code: 08-27535

Fort Garland was a United States Army post from 1858 to 1883. Today, Fort Garland is a historic unincorporated community, a post office, and a census-designated place (CDP) located in and governed by Costilla County, Colorado, United States. At the United States Census 2020, the population of the Fort Garland CDP was 464, while the population of the 81133 ZIP Code Tabulation Area was 840 including adjacent areas. The Fort Garland post office has the ZIP Code 81133. Fort Garland is a part of the Alamosa, CO Micropolitan Statistical Area.

== History ==
Fort Garland was established by the United States Army in June 1858 to protect white settlers from the Ute people in the San Luis Valley, which was then part of the New Mexico Territory. Fort Garland was built to replace the earlier Fort Massachusetts. The new Territory of Colorado was organized on February 28, 1861, and the Fort Garland, Colorado Territory, post office opened on February 25, 1862. The fort was abandoned in 1883 following the confinement of the tribes to Indian reservations in the Territory of Utah and the State of Colorado. The Fort Garland Museum preserves some of the historic buildings from the fort.

== Geography ==
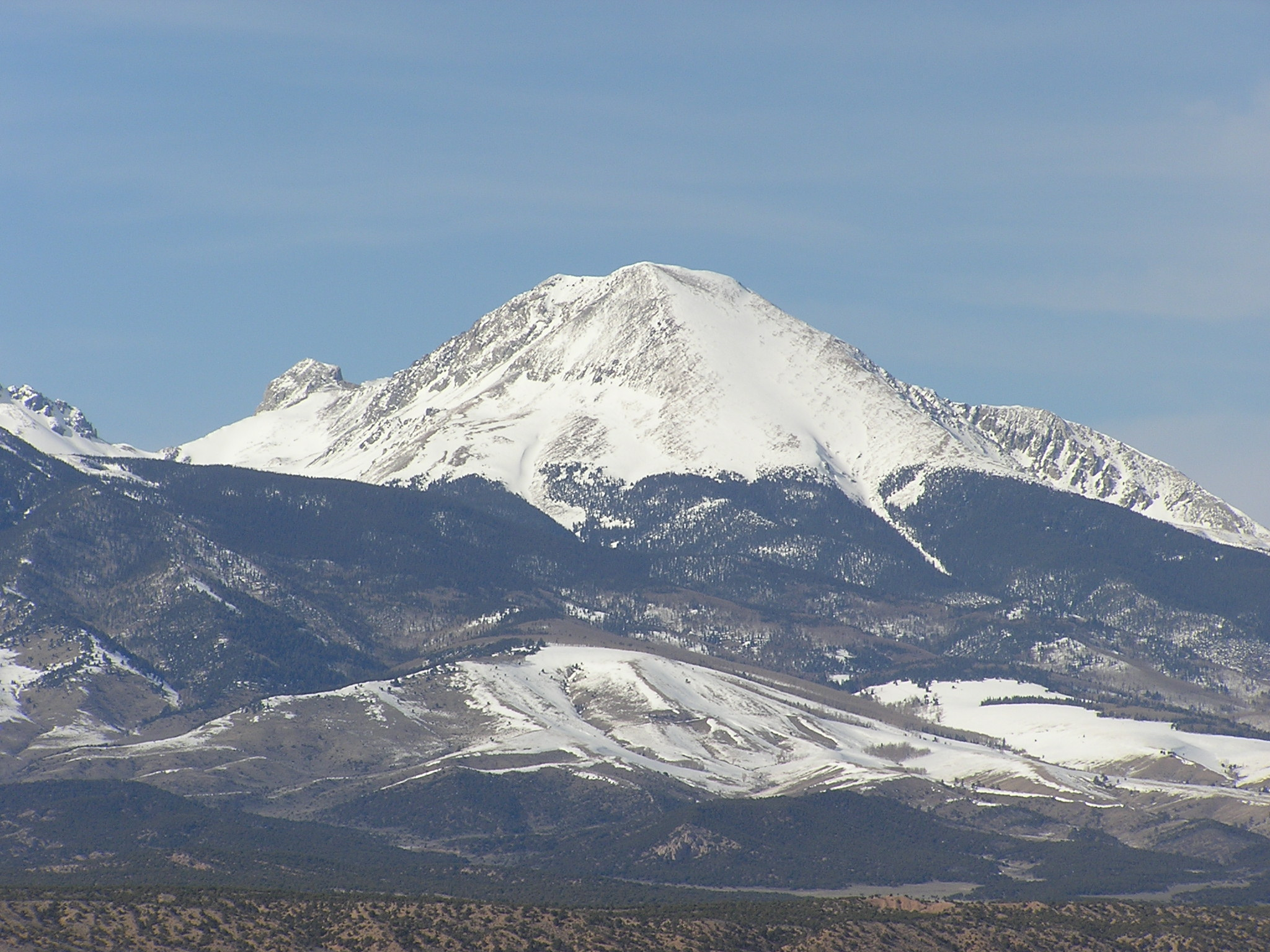
Mount Lindsey and Iron Nipple, Sangre de Cristo Range, taken from along C-159, about five miles south of Fort Garland

Fort Garland is located in northern Costilla County at coordinates 37.4289°N 105.4339°W and elevation 7,943 feet (2,421 m). Fort Garland is located at the crossroads of U.S. Route 160 and Colorado State Highway 159, which leads south towards Taos and Santa Fe, New Mexico. The town of Blanca is 4 miles (6.4 km) west on U.S. Route 160. Walsenburg is 47 miles (76 km) to the east, across the Sangre de Cristo Range.

At the 2020 United States Census, the Fort Garland CDP had an area of 240 acres (0.973 km^{2}), all land.

== Demographics ==
The United States Census Bureau initially defined the Fort Garland CDP for the United States Census 2000.

Fort Garland CDP, Colorado
| Year | Pop. | ±% |
|---|---|---|
| 2000 | 432 | — |
| 2010 | 433 | +0.2% |
| 2020 | 464 | +7.2% |
Source: United States Census Bureau

== Economy ==
Ute Cafe in Fort Garland

Fort Garland is referred to as the "Gateway to the San Luis Valley", as it is the first town one encounters when traveling west having crossed over La Veta Pass in the Sangre de Cristo Range. Fort Garland is home to many artists, painters, crafters and internationally known musicians.

Fort Garland has a business district with two motels, several restaurants, the Old Fort Market grocery store, the Fort Garland Museum, two gas stations, two recreational marijuana shops, a car wash, hair salon, campgrounds, hardware store, liquor store, and multiple shops featuring collectibles and antiquities as well as a Wild West show.

== Arts and culture ==
The Annual Fort Garland Band Jam Music Festival features local and regional musicians, as well as nationally and internationally recognized musical talent. This summer event, usually held in mid-July, includes an open-air market, local food vendors offering up traditional and regional cuisine, a beer garden, and children's activities. The music offered covers numerous styles, from traditional Spanish guitar to R&B to rock and roll.

The Blanca/Fort Garland Community Center is open to residents and the public on daily, monthly or annual fees.

The Entrada Visitor Center offers information on local and regional points of interest, such as the Great Sand Dunes, the Colorado 'Gator farm, UFO Watchtower and other activities located within the San Luis Valley.

== Infrastructure ==
The Fort Garland Water and Sanitation District provides services to residents. It has also provided water to the surrounding community who have cisterns.

== See also ==
- Alamosa, CO Micropolitan Statistical Area
- List of census-designated places in Colorado
- List of forts in Colorado
- List of military installations in Colorado
- List of populated places in Colorado
- List of post offices in Colorado
- Fort Massachusetts
- Old Spanish Trail
- Spanish Fort
