= Conejos County Hospital =

- San Luis Valley Health
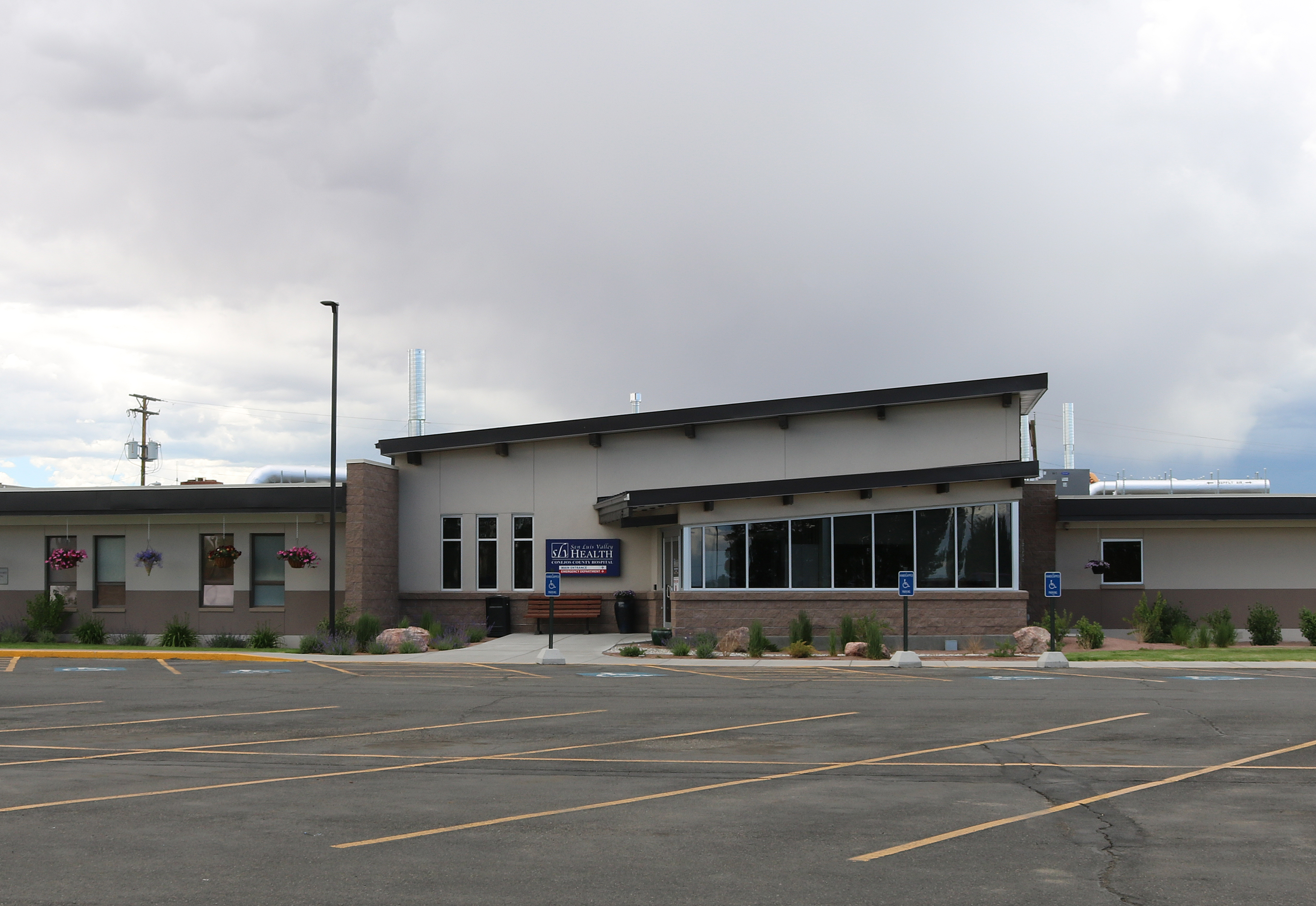
- The hospital's main entrance

- The hospital's location in Colorado.

Geography
- Location: 19021 Hwy 285; La Jara, Colorado 81140, Conejos County, Colorado, United States
- Coordinates: 37°15′47″N 105°57′56″W

Organization
- Type: General

Services
- Emergency department: Level IV trauma center
- Beds: 17

History
- Founded: 1963

Links
- Website: www.sanluisvalleyhealth.org/locations/conejos-county-hospital/
- Lists: Hospitals in Colorado

Conejos County Hospital is a critical access hospital in La Jara, Colorado, in Conejos County. The hospital has 17 beds.

The hospital is a Level IV trauma center.

The hospital serves Conejos and Costilla counties in the San Luis Valley. It is the only emergency service provider in the two counties.

== History and organization ==
The hospital was established in 1963. It was originally started and staffed by Mennonites who continued running the hospital through the 1970s. The hospital completed a $6 million expansion in 2019, which included an upgrade to its emergency rooms.

The hospital is one of two hospitals (and several regional clinics) that make up San Luis Valley Health (SLV Health), a small hospital network. The other hospital in the network is the San Luis Valley Regional Medical Center in Alamosa. SLV Health was founded in 2013.
