= Fort Massachusetts (Colorado) =

- Costilla County, Colorado; Near Fort Garland, Colorado in United States
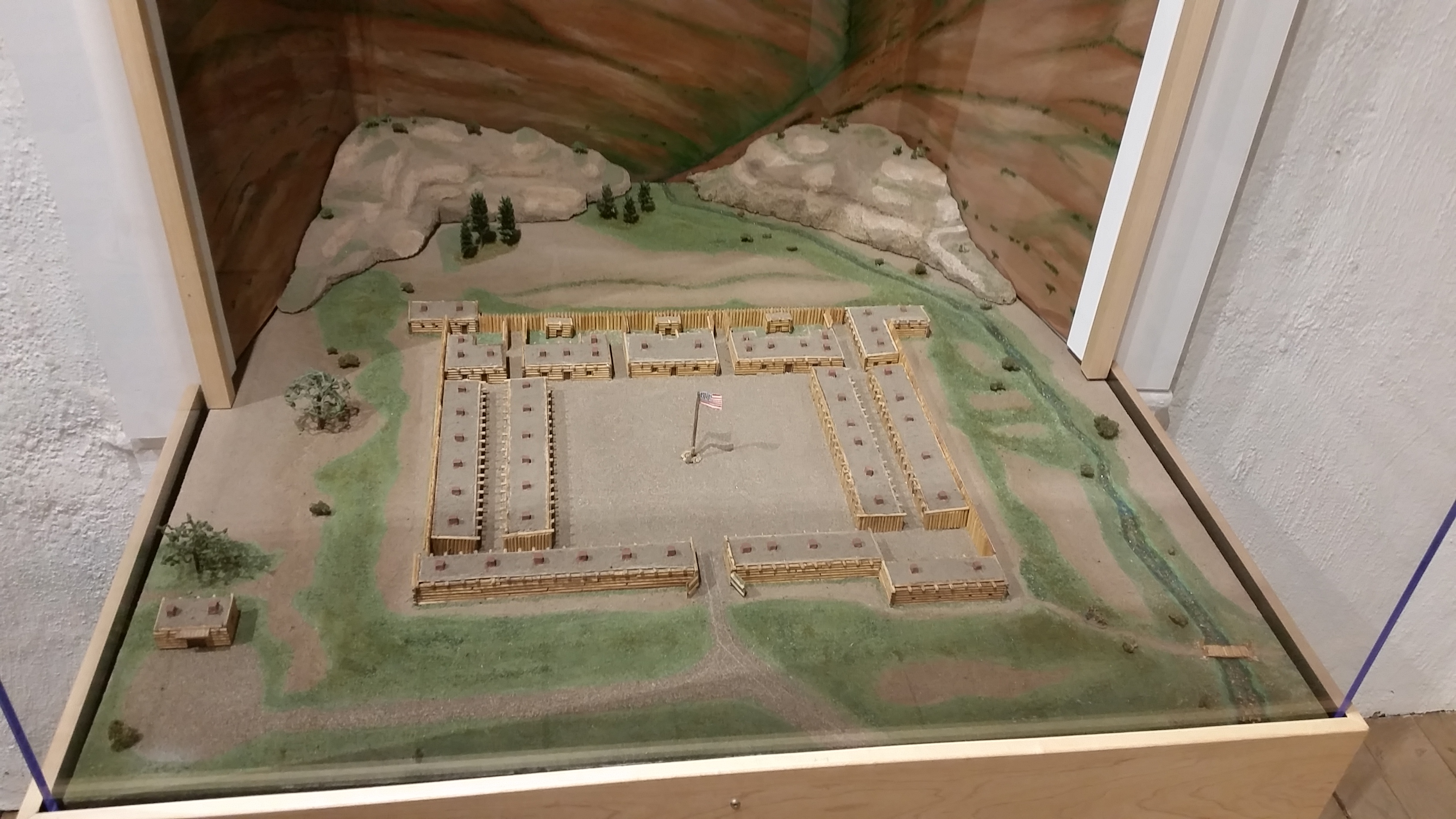
- A model of Fort Massachusetts located at the Fort Garland Museum in Fort Garland, Colorado. Some of the buildings were included as part of the wall. The entire fort was built of wood.

Site information
- Type: Former U.S. Military post
- Open to the public: No
- Condition: Archaeological site, Adams State University
- Website: www.adams.edu/academics/archaeology-field-school/

Location
- Estimate, six miles north of Fort Garland along Ute Creek, at the base of Mount Blanca
- Coordinates: 37°29′18″N 105°24′2″W

Fort Massachusetts was a military installation built in the San Luis Valley in Southern Colorado. It was located near the western bank of Ute Creek on the base of Mount Blanca and sat at an elevation of 8,000 feet, approximately 6 miles north of present-day Fort Garland.

== History ==
External image
- Sketch of Fort Massachusetts

Built in 1852, and abandoned in 1858, Fort Massachusetts was the first regularly-garrisoned government installation established on the soil that would soon be the territory of Colorado. However, at the time of its construction and occupation, the land was technically part of the New Mexico Territory, and the San Luis Valley remained vastly unsettled. The fort was built to maintain control of the valley and to protect white settlers and Ute Indians from one another. Its other purpose was to serve as a headquarters for Indian Agents and to make clear to Mexico that the area was now a U.S. territory as mandated by the Treaty of Guadalupe Hidalgo, which was signed five years before the construction of Fort Massachusetts.^{[1]}

The fortification was commissioned by the United States War Department in June 1852 and commanded by Major George A.H. Blake of the United States First Dragoons. The fort was constructed mostly out of wood in a quadrangular shape from the surrounding forest and was fortified by a wooden palisade wall. Two companies (Company F, 1st Dragoon, and Company H, 3rd United States Infantry) were garrisoned at the fort. In total, 93 men lived inside the fort's walls.

Along with soldiers, there were women and children who lived in the fort as well. They were the families of the soldiers, and officers. The wives tended to work as post laundresses, tending to the laundry of the soldiers who were garrisoned at the Fort.

== Indian Conflicts (1854-1855) ==
Indian bands continued to attack and raid settlements despite the military's presence. The fort itself was never attacked, however, the fort played an instrumental part in the suppression of a band of Mohuache Ute and Jicarilla Apache Indians who attacked Fort Pueblo, located near modern-day Pueblo, Colorado, on Christmas Day in 1854. After the news of the attack reached Colonel John Garland, the commander of the military district of New Mexico, he requested Governor David Meriwether to provide five companies of mounted volunteers to serve for a period of six months. Governor Meriwether granted the request and 500 volunteers were mustered into service on January 31, 1855. These volunteers joined up with the soldiers at Fort Massachusetts, one of whom was famed frontiersman and Indian Agent Kit Carson.

On March 18, 1855, scouts discovered an Indian war party that was led by Chief Tierra Blanca, the perpetrator of the massacre at Fort Pueblo. After scouts reported back, Colonel Thomas T. Fauntleroy, appointed commander of the forces sent by Garland, ordered his men to pursue Chief Blanca and his forces. The Indians found themselves overwhelmed and a retreat was called. Col. Fauntleroy's forces pursued the Indians across the San Luis Valley for several days until the majority of the force were killed, or escaped.

After chasing the Indian forces out of the San Luis Valley, Col. Fauntleroy ordered his forces back to Fort Massachusetts for a period of three weeks to rest. At the conclusion of three weeks, the Colonel split his forces up and sent half of them over the Sangre De Cristo range to campaign against Indian forces on the eastern plains, while the other half went north over Poncha Pass. The forces that went east were led by Lieutenant Colonel St. Vrain, and guided by Kit Carson.

Forces led by Colonel Fauntleroy discovered a band of Ute Indians camped out near the modern-day town of Salida, Colorado on the night of April 28, 1855. Upon daybreak, Col. Fauntleroy engaged the camp, and in a twenty-five minute battle, forty Utes were killed, and a large number of them were wounded. Only two of Fauntleroy's men were wounded in the engagement.

After defeats in both the San Luis Valley and eastern plains, the Utes and Apaches were ready for peace. The Ute peace delegation met with Governor Meriwether near Abiquiu, New Mexico on September 10, 1855. Governor Meriwether and the Ute delegation made a treaty under which the Utes would forfeit all territory in the San Luis Valley, excluding a 1,000-square mile reservation west of the Rio Grande River, and north of La Jara Creek. In addition, the Utes requested the United States pay an amount of $66,000, which was granted. The Apache delegation met with Governor Meriwether two days later on September 12, 1855, and made a similar treaty. The Apaches would forfeit all of their land excluding a 60,000-acre reservation, and requested a $36,000 payment. This ended the Indian campaign of 1855, which was the only large scale engagement that Fort Massachusetts played a role in.

== Closure of the fort ==
Even before the fort saw action in the campaign with the Utes and Apaches, there was talk about moving the fort due to its weak strategical location. This is highlighted by Colonel Joseph K.F. Mansfield, the Inspector General of the United States Army, after an inspection tour of the fort in 1853. An excerpt from his report follows:

"It is seated at the foot of the White Mountain which is perpetually snowtopped; and on Utah Creek at the mouth of a ravine out of which the creek flows a cool limpid stream. There is an abundance of wood and in the summer the grazing is good, but the warm season is short, and it is doubtful if corn will ripen here. The nearest settlement is 30 miles to the southward on the Coulubre (Culebra) River where there are about 25 families engaged in the planting of corn and wheat. The design of this post was to keep the Utah Indians in check and it is calculated for Dragoons and Infantry. The buildings are good and suitable as well as abundant. They are, however, placed too near the spur of the mountain for good defense against an enterprising enemy. All supplies for this post come from the settlements at the south as far as Taos Valley, and Fort Union, which may be called 165 miles distant. In winter the snow falls here to the depth of four feet….My impression are that this post would have been better located on the Culebra River, the most northern settlement in New Mexico, where access could be had to the Troops by the population of the Valley, without the hazard of being cut off by the Indians. The home of the Utah Indians is here, and particularly in the west of the Rio Grande del Norte. A post is therefore necessary in this quarter, and this Valley may before long be a good route of communication with the States in the summer season, and it probably is the best route of communicating between New Mexico and the Great Salt Lake and Northern California."

The fort was in a bad location not only for military strategy but for the protection of the settlers of the valley. It would often be snowed in during the winter and was located too close to Ute Creek, so it would often become a swamp during the warmer seasons. The fort had originally been placed because military scouts reported that the area was an Indian hunting ground, and at the time of the initial survey, the site was along the route settlers often took into the valley. However, by the time the fort was constructed, settlers had found easier trails that led into the valley.

In 1856 construction began on a new fort located six miles south of Fort Massachusetts. The new fort would consist of twenty-two one-story buildings built out of adobe. Completed in 1858, the new fort was named Fort Garland in honor of Colonel John Garland. Fort Massachusetts no longer stands, and it is located on private land not open to the public.
