= Closed Basin Project =

Groundwater extraction project in Colorado, US

Coordinates: 37.549486°N 105.673844°W

Location of Closed Basin Project in the western United States

The Closed Basin Project is a groundwater extraction project in the San Luis Valley in Colorado, United States, that began in the 1970s, and remains in operation in the 2020s. The project is managed by the United States Bureau of Reclamation.

== Location ==
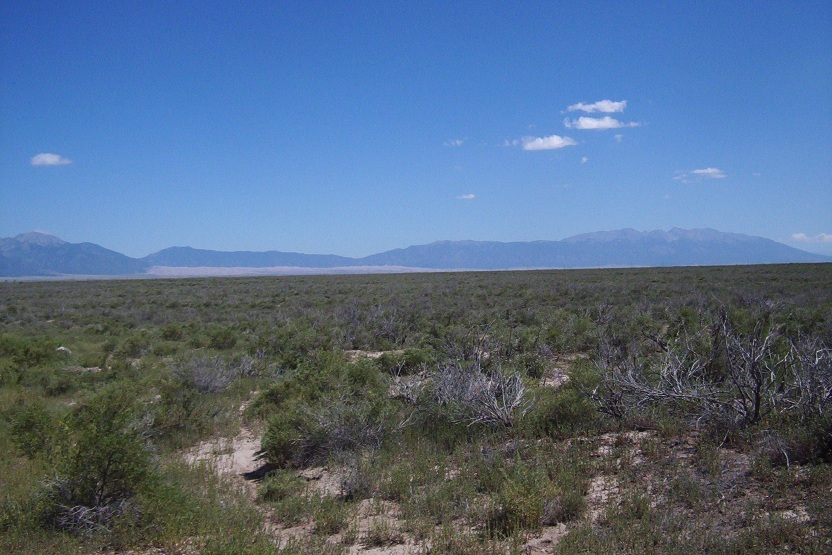
Typical closed basin landscape

A closed basin is a hydrologic basin that has no outlet for the water. Precipitation can only leave through evaporation or seepage. The closed basin of the San Luis Valley covers 2,940 square miles (7,600 km^{2}) between the San Luis Hills in the south, the San Juan Mountains to the west, Poncha Pass to the north and the Sangre de Cristo Mountains to the east. The basin is separated by a hydraulic divide at the southern end from the Rio Grande watershed. It contains the towns of Center, Hooper, Moffat, Mosca and Saguache and the Great Sand Dunes National Park and Preserve.

Streams that flow into the basin include irrigation diversions from the Rio Grande, the Carnero, La Garita, and Saguache creeks from the west, San Luis Creek from the north, and the North Crestone and Sand creeks from the east. The water spreads over the floor of the valley and either sinks into the underground aquifer or evaporates. The lowest part of the basin extends from the San Luis lakes north to the Blanca Wildlife Habitat Area. In this area the water table is very close to the surface. Water can evaporate directly from the soil or be taken up by plants such as salt grass, rabbit brush and greasewood, which release the water through evapotranspiration.

== Project ==
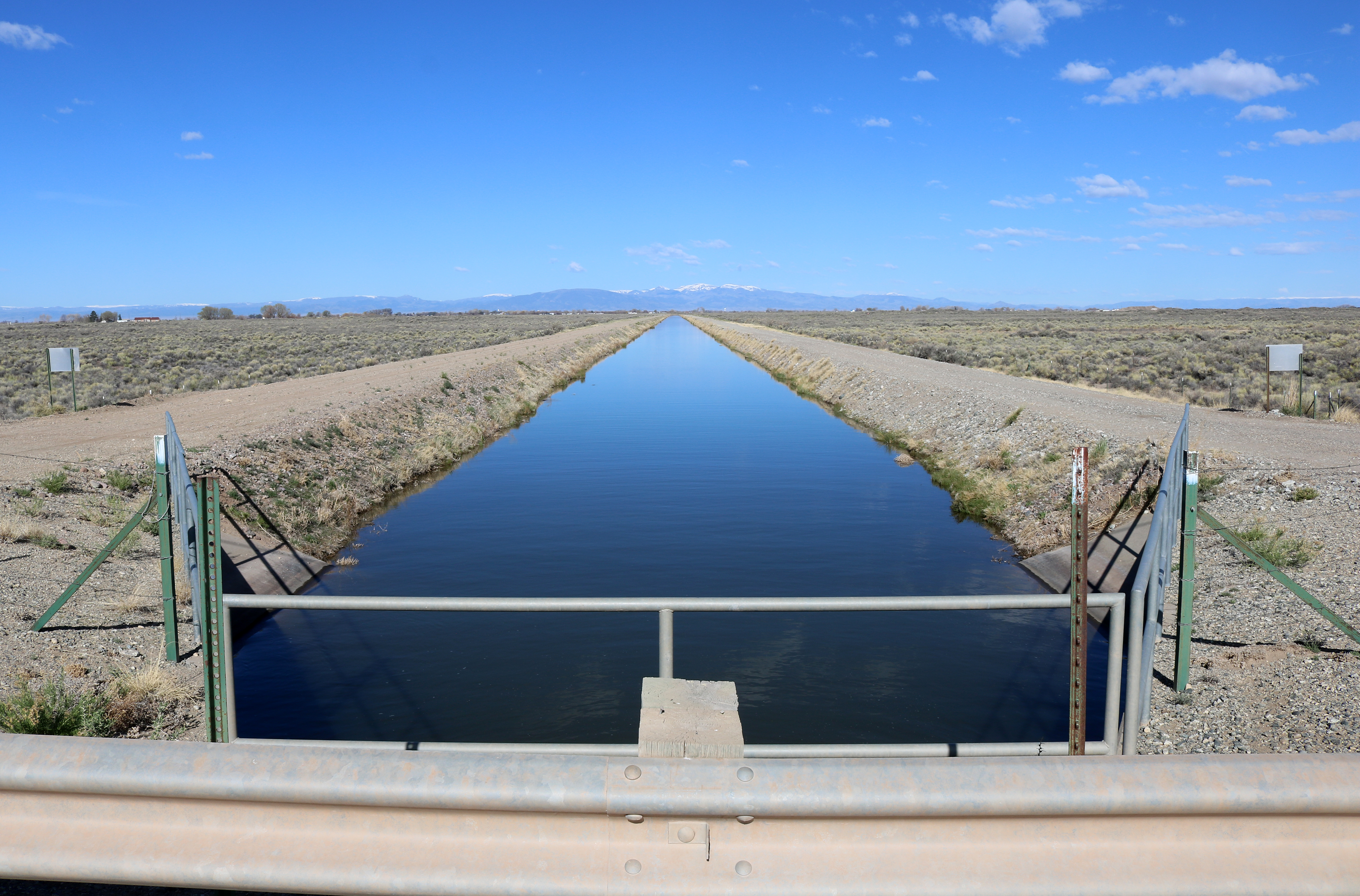
The Franklin Eddy Canal east of Alamosa at S 116 Road, looking west.

The Closed Basin Project was authorized by Congress in 1972 to extract groundwater from the lowest part of the basin in an area that covers 195 square miles (510 km^{2}). Colorado uses the water as part of its contribution to the Rio Grande Compact of 1939, making more water available for irrigation in Colorado. It also helps the United States meet its 1906 treaty obligations with Mexico for supply of water from the Rio Grande. The project, operated and maintained by the Bureau of Reclamation with civil maintenance by the Rio Grande Water Conservation District, extracts groundwater through a network of shallow wells and delivers it through the 42-mile (68 km) Franklin Eddy Canal to the Rio Grande. Some of the water is delivered to the Alamosa National Wildlife Refuge, the Blanca Wildlife Habitat Area and San Luis Lake.

170 salvage wells were built ranging in depth from 85 to 110 feet (26 to 34 m) and delivering 50 to 1,100 US gallons (190 to 4,160 L; 42 to 916 imp gal) per minute. There are about 115 miles (185 km) of pipeline laterals that carry water to the conveyance channel. The channel has a PVC lining covered with 12 to 16 inches (300 to 410 mm) of aggregate and fill, with a capacity that expands from 45 to 160 cubic feet (1.3 to 4.5 m^{3}) per second from north to south. Trees have been plated along the channel in the areas that are most susceptible to wind erosion, watered through drip irrigation systems. Water flows along the channel at about 1 foot (0.30 m) per second. More than 132 observation wells were used as of 2012 to measure water level or pressure from the aquifers, with the data used to ensure the project stays within the authorized drawdown limits. As of 2016, 11 of the wells had been shut down because their output exceeded the limit of 350 parts per million (ppm) for total dissolved solids and therefore cannot be discharged into the Rio Grande under the river compact.

== Results ==
Under the law that authorized the project, water levels in wells that existed outside the project boundary before pumping started must not drop more than 2 feet (0.61 m), and water with more than 350 parts per million total dissolved solids cannot be used. About 60 of the 170 wells in the project are closed down because of the drawdown limits, and eleven because of the water quality requirements. The original estimate was that the project would deliver 100,000 acre-feet (120,000,000 m^{3}) annually. This has never been achieved. From 2000 to 2011, the average annual output was 17,300 acre-feet (21,300,000 m^{3}) annually.
