= Missouri Coteau =

Plateau in the northern United States and southern Canada

Coordinates: 50.8°N 109.2°W

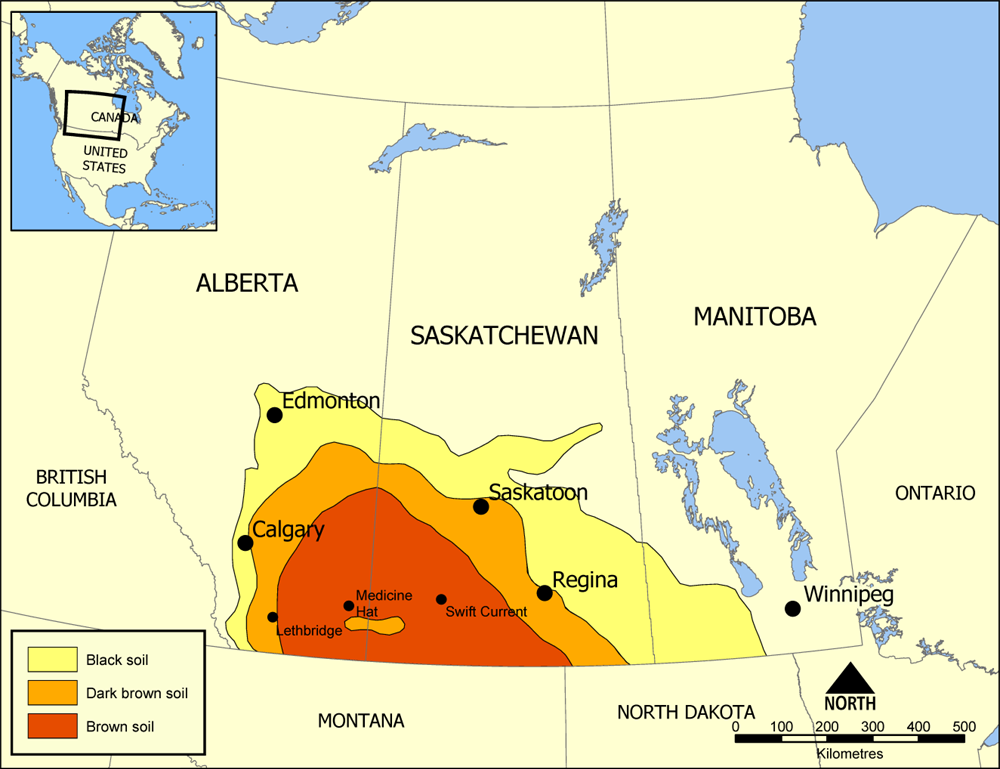
Map of Palliser's Triangle. Canadian section of the Missouri Coteau

The Missouri Coteau, or Missouri Plateau, (French: Coteau du Missouri) is a large plateau that stretches along the eastern side of the valley of the Missouri River in central North Dakota and north-central South Dakota in the United States. In the Canadian provinces of Saskatchewan and Alberta this physiographic region is classified as the Uplands Missouri Coteau, which is a part of the Great Plains Province or Alberta Plateau Region, which extends across the southwest corner of Saskatchewan as well as the southeast corner of Alberta. Historically, in Canada the area was known as the Palliser's Triangle and regarded as an extension of the Great American Desert and unsuitable for agriculture and thus designated by Canadian geographer and explorer John Palliser. The terrain of the Missouri Coteau features low hummocky, undulating, rolling hills, potholes, and grasslands.

Apart from being a geographical area, the Missouri Coteau also has a cultural connection to the people of the area, the Métis people of South Dakota, along with other Indigenous groups. The history of this plateau is large, and the Missouri Coteau has a significance to these people.

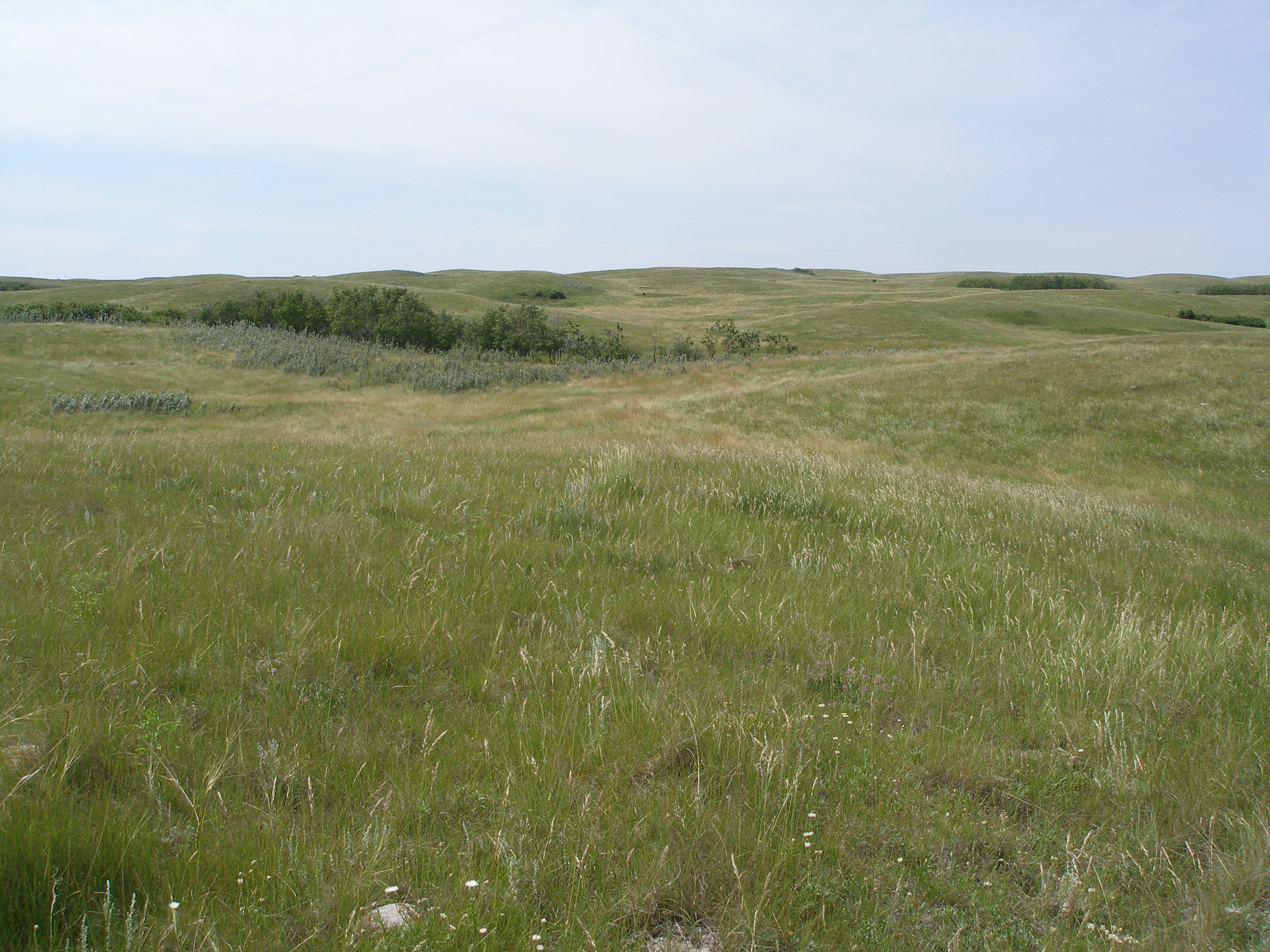
Native grasslands in the Missouri Coteau of Saskatchewan

== Land and soil ==
Geologically, the plateau is part of the extended plateau of the Great Plains in the Dakotas, and is separated from the main plateau to the west by the Missouri River Trench. The plateau is underlain by Pierre Shale covered with hardened deposits from repeated glaciations. The plateau also contains deposits of lignite, mirabilite (sodium sulfate), and bentonite. While subjected to continental glaciation, it was north and west of the Driftless Area, an area which escaped glaciation. Agriculturally, The Missouri Coteau is known for grains and livestock agriculture, because the land cannot sustain many other forms of agriculture or farming.

== Agriculture and growing conditions ==
The Missouri Coteau is known for being an area with difficult growing and agricultural conditions, and this is because of the weather and specific soil conditions of the land that makes growing a difficulty for this area. The plateau is poorly drained and is interspersed with glacial water deposits. This is because of the poor drainage in the area, and the plateau’s close proximity to the Prairie Pothole Region. It is transversed by several broad sags marking the ancient stream valleys of the eastern continuations of the Grand, Moreau, Cheyenne, Bad, and White rivers. To the east of the plateau, the lowland valley of the James River was formed by the lobe of the most recent ice age, separating the plateau from the Coteau des Prairies substantially. This specific area is also attached to the Canadian Prairies, with forests and elevated areas remaining at a minimum on these flat lands.

== See also ==
- Geography of Saskatchewan
- Geography of North Dakota
- Geography of Alberta
- Geography of Montana
- Coteau des Prairies
- Cypress Hills (Canada)
- Moose Mountain Upland

== Sources ==
- John C. Hudson (8 February 2002). Across This Land: A Regional Geography of the United States and Canada. JHU Press. pp. 296–. ISBN 978-0-8018-6567-1.
- Lass, W. (1965). The Fur Trade on the Upper Missouri, 1840-1865. Business History Review (pre-1986), 39(000003), 416 Retrieved from: https://uottawa primo.hosted.exlibrisgroup.com/primo-explore/search
- Natural Resources Canada, Earth Sciences Sector, & Canada Centre for Mapping and Earth Observation. (n.d.). The Missouri Coteau. Retrieved from http://www4.rncan.gc.ca/search-place-names/unique?id=244e0c3dc6be11d892e2080020a0f4c9
- Penner, Lynden, "Missouri Coteau", The Encyclopedia of The Great Plains, retrieved 2007-05-16
- Phillips, R., Beeri, L., & DeKeyser, O. (2005). Remote wetland assessment for Missouri Coteau prairie glacial basins. Wetlands, 25(2), 335-349. Retrieved from: https://link.springer.com/article/10.1672/10
- Richards, J.H.; Fung, K.I. (1969), Atlas of Saskatchewan, University of Saskatchewan: Modern Press
- Shjeflo, Jelmer B. "Evapotranspiration and the Water Budget of Prairie Potholes in North Dakota". Archived from the original on 2012-04-26. Retrieved 2012-12-24.
