= Penitente Canyon =

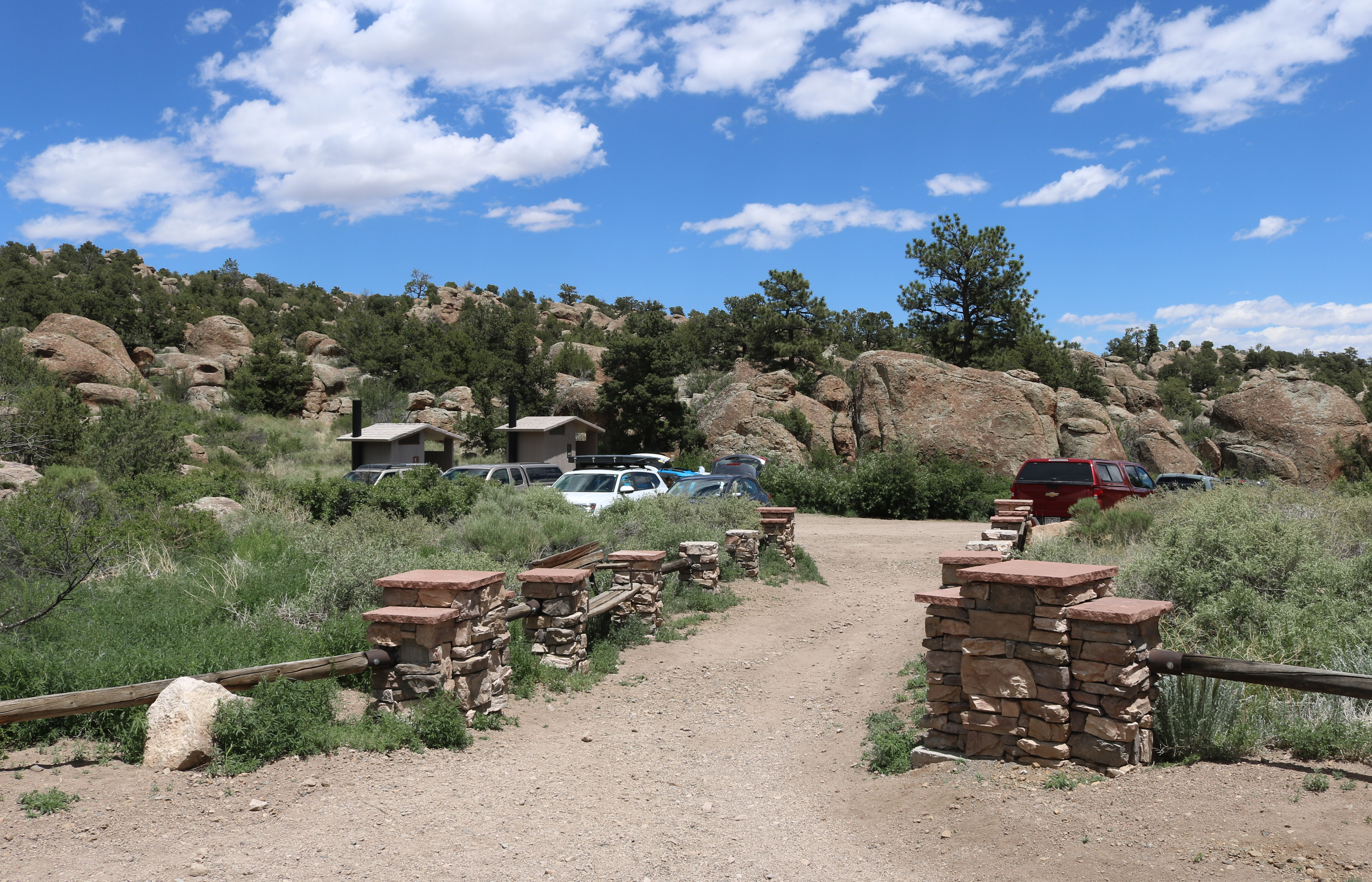
- The main parking area
- Floor elevation: 7,930 ft (2,420 m)

Geography
- Coordinates: 37°50′31″N 106°16′50″W
- Interactive map of Penitente Canyon

Penitente Canyon is located in the San Luis Valley of Colorado, USA. It was once a refuge for the Penitentes. The area, located on the lands of the Bureau of Land Management, offers rock climbing and a campground.
