= San Luis Valley Regional Medical Center =

- San Luis Valley Health
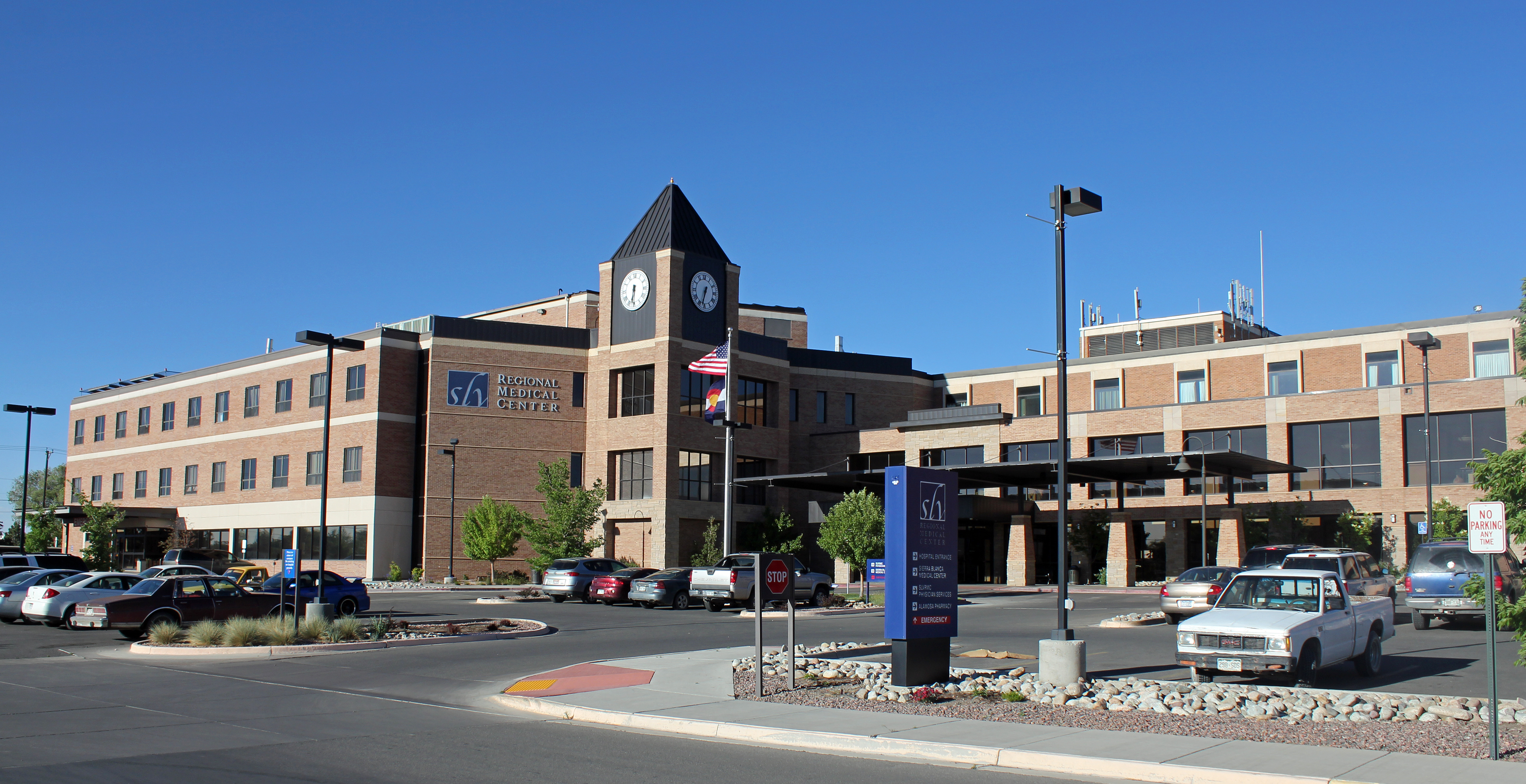
- The hospital's main entrance area

Geography
- Location: Alamosa, Colorado, San Luis Valley, Colorado, United States
- Coordinates: 37°28′20″N 105°52′57″W

Services
- Emergency department: Level III trauma center
- Beds: 49

Links
- Website: www.sanluisvalleyhealth.org/locations/regional-medical-center/
- Lists: Hospitals in Colorado

San Luis Valley Regional Medical Center (SLVRMC) is an acute care hospital located in the San Luis Valley in Alamosa, Colorado. It serves southern Colorado and northern New Mexico.

== Operations ==
The hospital has 49 licensed beds and is a Level III trauma center.

The hospital houses a 1.5 tesla MRI unit, a 16 slice CT scanner, and the only intensive-care unit in the San Luis Valley. SLVRMC owns the Physician Services Specialty Clinic in Alamosa and provides the only specialty physicians who serve the Valley population.

The hospital is one of two hospitals (and several regional clinics) that make up San Luis Valley Health (SLV Health), a small hospital network. The other hospital is Conejos County Hospital in La Jara. SLV Health was founded in 2013.
