= Missouri River Trench =

Valley in North and South Dakota, U.S.

The Missouri River Trench is the geological name applied to the broad valley of the Missouri River as it flows southward through North Dakota and South Dakota in the United States.

The valley averages approximately 1 mile (1.6 km) wide, with the valley floor averaging between 300 and 600 feet (91 and 183 m) below the surrounding bluffs. The valley was extensively dammed between 1946 and 1966 to provide a series of reservoirs in the Dakotas. Geologically, the valley separates the main plateau of the Great Plains to the west from the Missouri Coteau to the east.

Although cultivation has added markedly to the sediment in the river as it flows through the valley, the water was turbid even before the widespread introduction of agriculture, according to early European travellers. Erosion and deposition are believed to be in equilibrium in the trench. Siltation now provides a major challenge for the impounded sections of the river in the valley.
