= Sag (geology) =

Depressed, persistent low area

In geology a sag, or trough, is a depressed, persistent, low area; the opposite of an arch, or ridge, a raised, persistent, high area. The terms sag and arch were used historically to describe very large features, for example, characterizing North America as two arches with a sag between them.

Also, a sag is a former river bed which has been partially filled with debris from glaciation or other natural processes but which is still visible in the surface terrain. Sags formed by the former river beds of large rivers often become the valleys of smaller streams after a change of course by the main river.

Examples of sags include the former continuations of the Grand, Moreau, and White rivers in South Dakota in the United States. Before the last ice age, these rivers continued eastward past their current confluences with the present course of Missouri River. The sags are prominently visible on the plateau of the Missouri Coteau, allowing small streams to drain into the Missouri from its eastern side.
