= Fort Garland =

- U.S. National Register of Historic Places
- Colorado State Register of Historic Properties
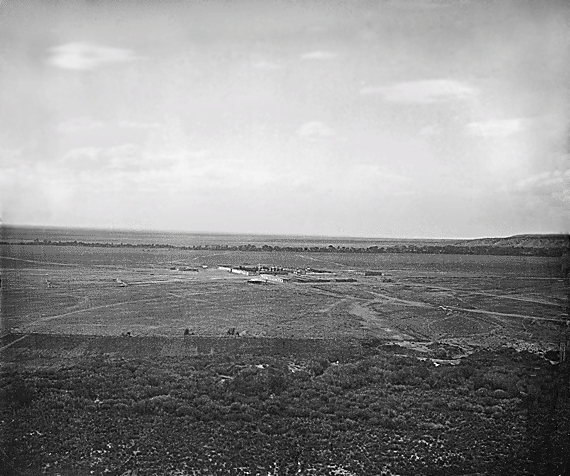
- Fort Garland in 1874.

- Location within Colorado Location within the United States
- Location: Fort Garland, Colorado
- Coordinates: 37.42397°N 105.43224°W
- Built: 1858
- NRHP reference No.: 70000156
- CSRHP No.: 5CT.46
- Added to NRHP: February 26, 1970

Fort Garland (1858–1883), Colorado, United States, was designed to house two companies of soldiers to protect settlers in the San Luis Valley, then in the Territory of New Mexico (1850-1912). It was named for General John Garland (1793-1861), then commander of the United States Army's Military District of New Mexico.

== History ==
Colonel Kit Carson and New Mexico Volunteers were stationed here after the American Civil War (1861-1865), in 1866 and he successfully negotiated a treaty with the local native Utes in 1867.

The Ninth U.S. Cavalry (Buffalo Soldiers) was stationed here for three years between 1876 and 1879. In 1876, these troops were called to the La Plata region to prevent conflict between the Utes and white mining prospectors. The following year, they helped remove illegal white settlers from Ute reservation lands.

In 1879, United States military units from Fort Garland were called upon by Nathan Meeker, the Indian Agent of the Bureau of Indian Affairs at the White River Agency. Meeker and others were killed, and family members taken captive by unhappy Utes. The captives were released and the Utes were moved once again, which reduced the need for a military fort.

== Fort Garland Museum ==
The Colorado Historical Society restored the fort and opened the Fort Garland Museum in 1950. Restored and reconstructed buildings include the adobe Commandant's Quarters, where Kit Carson and his wife once lived, the cavalry barracks with exhibits of Hispanic traditional arts and 19th century transportation artifacts, and officer's quarters. Permanent exhibits focus on Kit Carson and Buffalo Soldiers. The museum is administered by History Colorado organization.

Pike's Stockade, the reconstructed stockade site where Western explorer and Army officer Zebulon Pike raised the American flag in 1807, is located about 45 miles southwest of the fort.

== See also ==
- National Register of Historic Places listings in Costilla County, Colorado
