= Alamosa National Wildlife Refuge =

Wildlife refuge in Colorado, US

- IUCN category IV (habitat/species management area)
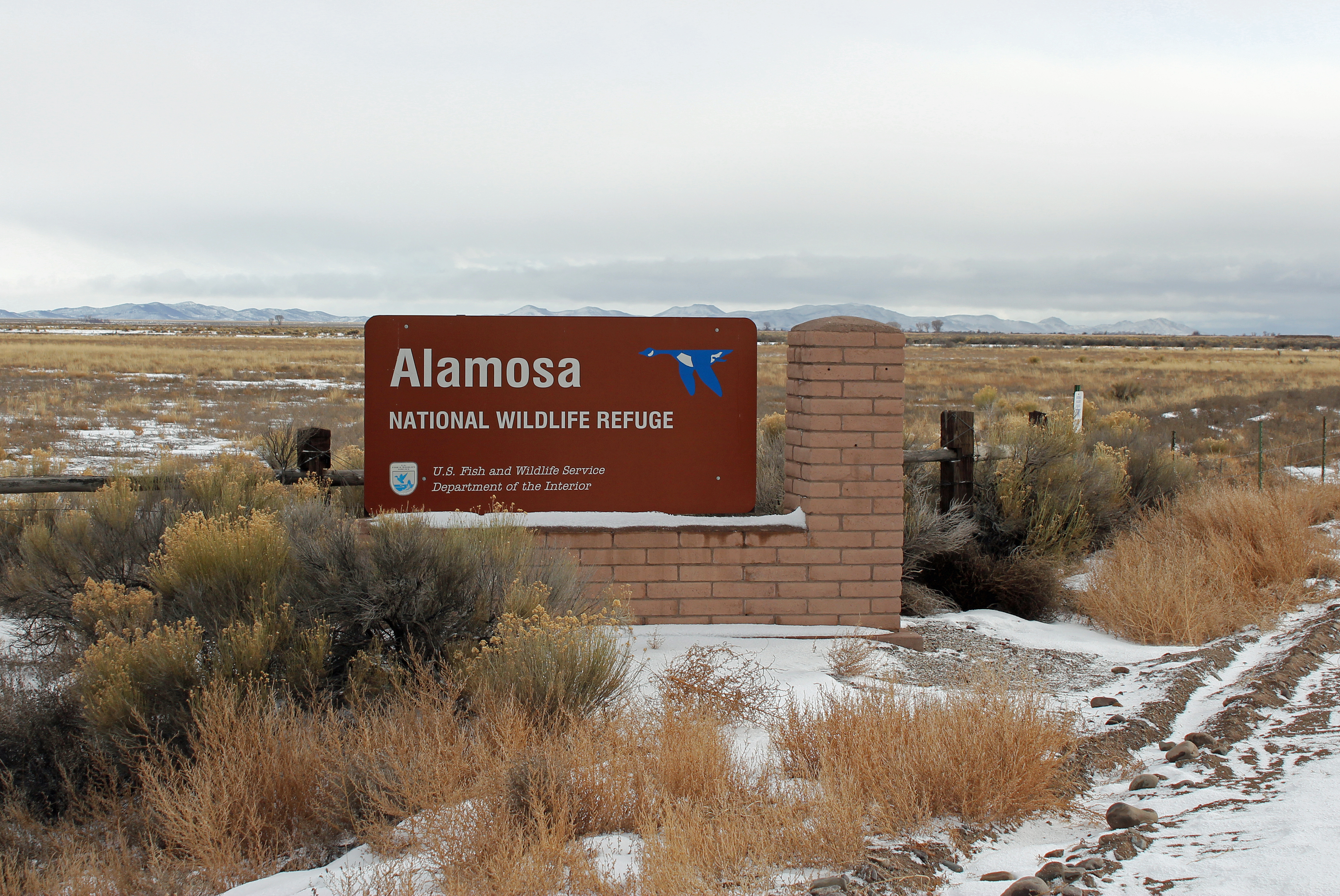
- The sign at the northern entrance in late 2014.

- Location within the United States
- Location: Alamosa County, Conejos County & Costilla County, Colorado, United States
- Nearest city: Alamosa, CO
- Coordinates: 37°24′30″N 105°46′30″W
- Area: 11,169 acres (45.20 km^{2})
- Established: 1962
- Governing body: U.S. Fish and Wildlife Service
- Website: Alamosa National Wildlife Refuge

The Alamosa National Wildlife Refuge is an 11,169-acre (4,520 ha) United States National Wildlife Refuge located in southern Colorado. The site is located in the San Luis Valley along the east side of the Rio Grande approximately 8 miles (13 km) southeast of Alamosa primarily in southeastern Alamosa County, although very small parts extend into northeastern Conejos and western Costilla counties. It is managed by the United States Fish and Wildlife Service jointly with the Baca and Monte Vista National Wildlife Refuges. It was established in 1962 as a haven for migratory birds and other wildlife.

The site consists of wet meadows, river oxbows and riparian corridor primarily within the flood plain of the Rio Grande, and dry uplands vegetated with greasewood and saltbush. These areas support a small but rich biodiversity including songbirds, water birds, raptors, red fox, mule deer, black bear, beaver and coyotes. Water from the Rio Grande is supplemented by water from the Closed Basin Project. The site includes a visitor center and two-mile roundtrip hiking trail. It is considered to be more wild and less intensely managed than the nearby Monte Vista refuge.
