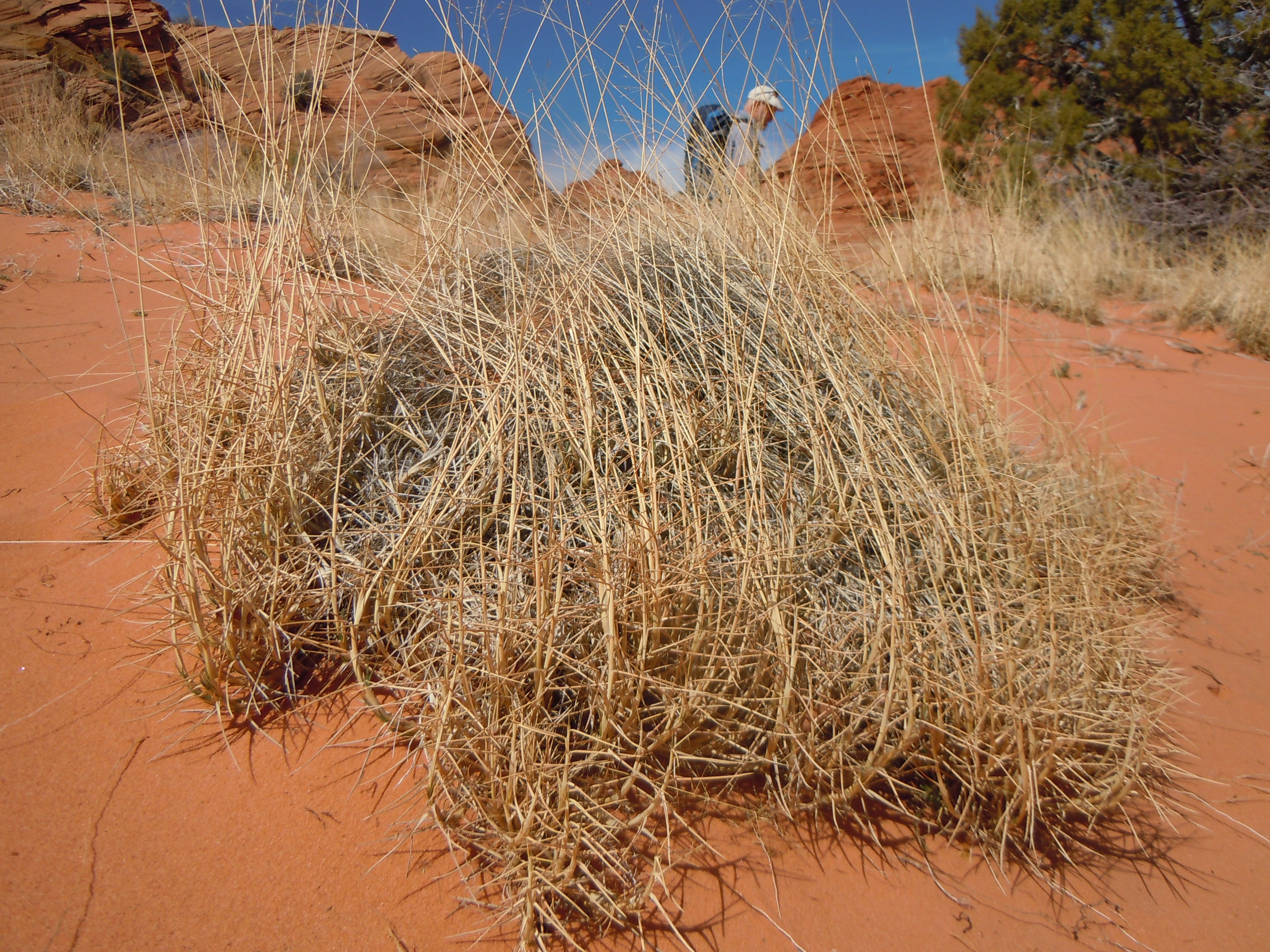

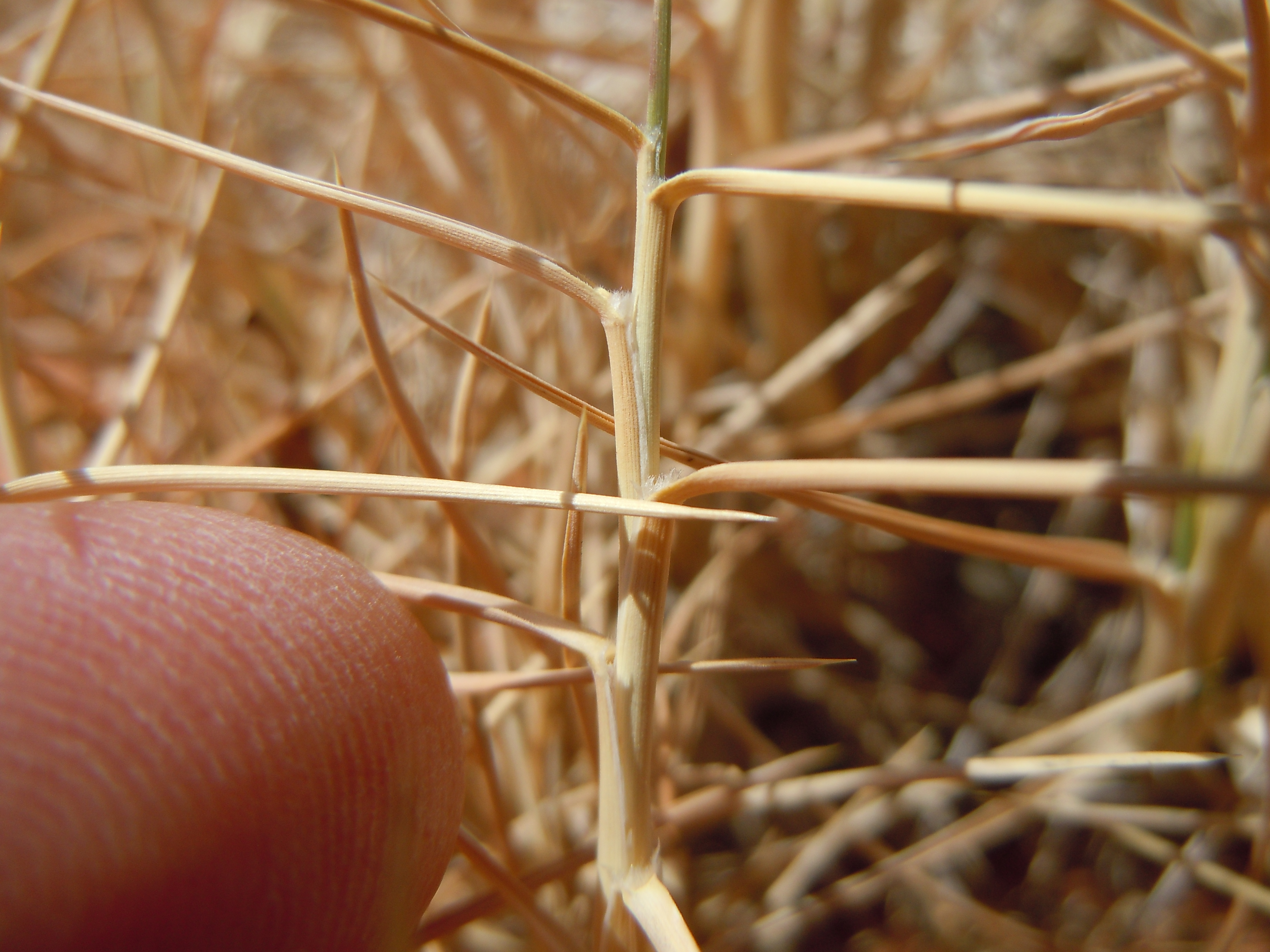

Conservation status
- Apparently Secure (NatureServe)

Scientific classification
- Kingdom: Plantae
- Clade: Tracheophytes
- Clade: Angiosperms
- Clade: Monocots
- Clade: Commelinids
- Order: Poales
- Family: Poaceae
- Subfamily: Chloridoideae
- Genus: Muhlenbergia
- Species: M. pungens

Binomial name
- Muhlenbergia pungens Thurb.

= Muhlenbergia pungens =

Species of plant

Muhlenbergia pungens, the sandhill muhly or wickiup grass, is a variety of muhly grass which is found in the arid regions of western North America. It is named after the botanist Gotthilf Heinrich Ernst Muhlenberg.

It spreads by forming lateral underground stems and so forms clumps or tussocks. These are useful in binding dry, loose soil and so it may be propagated to stabilise slopes or control erosion. It has little agricultural use but may be eaten by foraging animals. It has been used by the Hopi of Arizona to make brushes.

Sandhill muhly grows in southwestern South Dakota, Kansas, southern Wyoming, Colorado, Utah, Arizona, New Mexico, and in the Texas Panhandle, as well as a disjunct area in Real County, Texas.
