= San Luis Valley =

High-altitude basin in the United States

Coordinates: 37°12′N 105°25′W

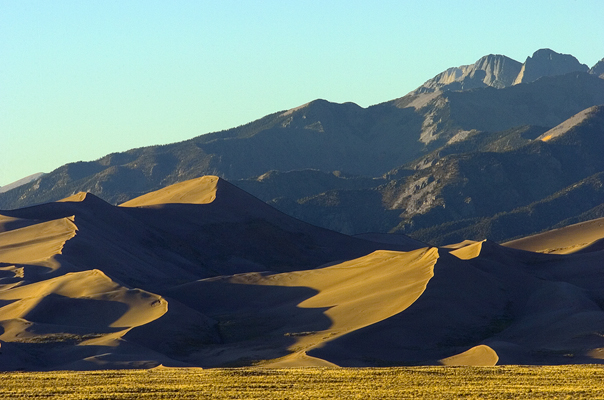
Great Sand Dunes National Park and Preserve in Colorado sits directly west of the Sangre de Cristo Range, which is featured in the background.

The San Luis Valley is a region in south-central Colorado with a small portion overlapping into New Mexico. The valley is approximately 122 miles (196 km) long and 74 miles (119 km) wide, making it the largest alpine valley in the world. It extends from the Continental Divide on the northwest rim into New Mexico on the south. It contains 6 counties and portions of 3 others. It is an extensive high-elevation depositional basin of approximately 8,000 square miles (21,000 km^{2}) with an average elevation of 7,664 feet (2,336 m) above sea level. The valley is a section of the Rio Grande Rift and is drained to the south by the Rio Grande, which rises in the San Juan Mountains to the west of the valley and flows south into New Mexico. The San Luis Valley has a cold desert climate but has substantial water resources from the Rio Grande and groundwater.

The San Luis Valley was ceded to the United States by Mexico following the Mexican–American War. Hispanic settlers began moving north and settling in the valley after the United States made a treaty with the Utes and established a fort in the early 1850s. Prior to the Mexican war the Spanish and Mexican governments had reserved the valley to the Utes. Later in the 19th century Anglo settlers began to settle in the valley and engaged in mining, ranching, and irrigated agriculture. Today the valley has a diverse Anglo and Hispanic population.

== History ==
=== Utes ===
Prior to 1868 the Capote (Kapota) band of Ute Indians lived in the valley. The Utes made a treaty of peace with the United States in 1849 after the Mexican War. Shortly thereafter settlers from New Mexico established several small settlements in what is now Colorado and in 1868 the Utes were removed to a reservation in western Colorado. They continued to play a role in Saguache in the northwestern corner of the valley from the Los Pinos Agency to the west of Saguache until they lost their extensive reservation as the result of the Meeker Massacre in 1879.

=== Spanish and Mexican administration ===
The area was administered as part of the Spanish, later Mexican, province of Nuevo Mexico. In 1843, the government of New Mexico created the Sangre de Cristo Land Grant consisting of 1,000,000 acres (4,000 km^{2}) of the valley and granted the family of Carlos Beaubien. The area was ceded to the United States in 1848 after the Mexican–American War in the Treaty of Guadalupe Hidalgo.

=== United States administration ===
Extensive settlement began in the San Luis Valley, primarily by Hispanic farmers and ranchers from New Mexico, in the 1850s. Early settlers built a church in the village that is now called San Luis and dedicated it on the Feast of Saint Louis, 21 June 1851. At present, the San Luis Valley has the largest native Hispanic population in Colorado; many families are directly descended from the original New Mexican settlers. The surge of immigration followed the construction by the U.S. Army of Fort Massachusetts for protection against the Utes, who had previously barred settlers. The history of the U.S. military presence in the valley is preserved at Fort Garland and other historic preserves in the valley.

The San Luis Valley became part of the Territory of Colorado in 1861. The original Ute population was confined to the Southern Ute and Ute Mountain Indian reservations in the late 19th century.

- Unlike the rest of Colorado, the United States surveyed the lands in the San Luis Valley using the New Mexico Meridian and Baseline.
- The San Luis Valley was one of eight candidate sites to detonate the first atomic bomb with White Sands Proving Ground ultimately selected for the Trinity nuclear test.
- The outlaw Felipe Espinosa operated in the San Luis Valley.

== Geography ==
The San Luis Valley is the broad, generally flat, valley at the headwaters of the Rio Grande in south central Colorado and far north central New Mexico. The northern portion of the San Luis Valley is an endorheic basin; surface water does not exit this area. Irrigated agriculture is possible in the area due to groundwater and streams fed by the average 100 inches of snow the surrounding mountain ranges receive. The southern portion is drained by the Rio Grande.

There is no clear southern boundary but the term is generally used to include the San Luis Hills of southern Colorado and the Taos Plateau of northern New Mexico. About 50 miles from east to west and about 150 miles from north to south, the valley is bounded on the east by the Sangre de Cristo Mountains and on the west by the San Juan Mountains.

Within Colorado the San Luis Valley is generally considered to comprise five Colorado counties: Saguache, Alamosa, Rio Grande, Conejos, and Costilla. The principal towns are: Alamosa, Monte Vista, Del Norte, South Fork, Saguache, Center, Moffat, Fort Garland, San Luis, Blanca, Antonito, La Jara, Capulin, Manassa, Sanford, Romeo, Crestone, Villa Grove, Hooper, Mosca, San Acacio and a number of smaller locations. A few other counties of Colorado have some land in the Rio Grande Basin including Archuleta, Mineral, Hinsdale, and San Juan.

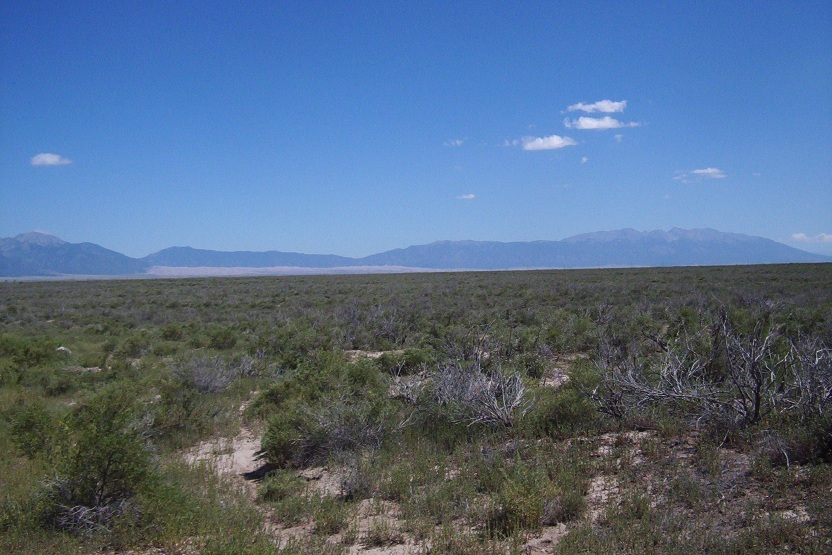
Typical greasewood "chico brush" in the San Luis Closed Basin of the northern San Luis Valley in Colorado. Taken just south of the bridge over La Garita Creek on Highway 17 between Hooper and Moffat, Colorado. View is to the southeast. The Great Sand Dunes are in the background as are the Sangre De Cristo Range. Medano and Mosca Passes are the low points, the Sierra Blanca is to the right.

Blanca Peak is prominent in the Sierra Blanca at the southern end of the northernmost section of the mountains, which is known as the Sangre de Cristo Range. There are several passes, with elevations between 9,000 and 10,000 feet (2,700 and 3,000 m), giving access to the valley. North La Veta Pass, through the Sangre de Cristo Mountains, is used by U.S. Highway 160 and by the Colorado Pacific Rio Grande Railroad (formerly a branch of the Denver & Rio Grande Western) tracks. Other passes used historically were Medano, Mosca and Sangre de Cristo Passes.

The Great Sand Dunes are a famous feature of the valley. They lie directly to the west of the Sangre de Cristo Mountains. The dunes can reach 750 feet (230 m) high. The Great Sand Dunes National Park and Preserve is now in place to protect both the dunes and the numerous archeological sites found in the area. The natural valley aquifer is close to the surface in this part of the valley, and helps with maintenance of water levels in the San Luis Lakes, just to the west of the sand dunes.

Elevation rises as you go north in the valley to Poncha Pass, used now by U.S. Highway 285 and historically by the narrow gauge tracks of the Denver and Rio Grande Railroad. Otto Mears, then of Saguache, built and operated a historic toll road over Poncha Pass at the north end of the valley into the San Luis Valley during Colorado's 19th century mining era when the valley was the gateway to the San Juan and Gunnison country and the Ute agency was in the mountains west of Saguache. Mount Otto on the east side of the valley is named after him.

Cumbres Pass is a 10,015 ft. pass between Antonito, Colorado and Chama, New Mexico. The pass is traversed by State Highway 17 and the Cumbres and Toltec Scenic Railroad (originally built as the San Juan Extension of the Denver and Rio Grande Railroad that ran to Durango, Colorado). From the headwaters of the Rio Grande Wolf Creek Pass is the route of U.S. Highway 160 between Del Norte, Colorado and Pagosa Springs, Colorado, while Spring Creek Pass is the route of State Highway 149 between U.S. Highway 160 and Lake City, Colorado. Stony Pass, sometimes spelled Stoney Pass, a historic wagon road to the mining camps of the San Juans, is now a jeep trail. At the north end of the valley, North Pass is the route of State Highway 114 between Saguache, Colorado and Gunnison, Colorado, bypassing the original route over Cochetopa Pass, now a county road.

The Rio Grande follows a course through the southern valley from Del Norte southeastward via Alamosa to New Mexico. South of Alamosa it is joined by several streams from the west including the Alamosa River and the Conejos River and Culebra Creek from the east. Most of the northern valley is an endorheic basin called the San Luis Closed Basin. Generally, within the Closed Basin the major streams such as Saguache Creek, San Luis Creek, and the streams from the west face of the Sangre de Cristos flow only a short distance onto the valley floor as surface streams. Only in very wet years, perhaps every 20 years, does the stream system in the Closed Basin flow as a contiguous unit into San Luis Lake at the low point of the Closed Basin west of the Great Sand Dunes.

=== Land ownership and management ===
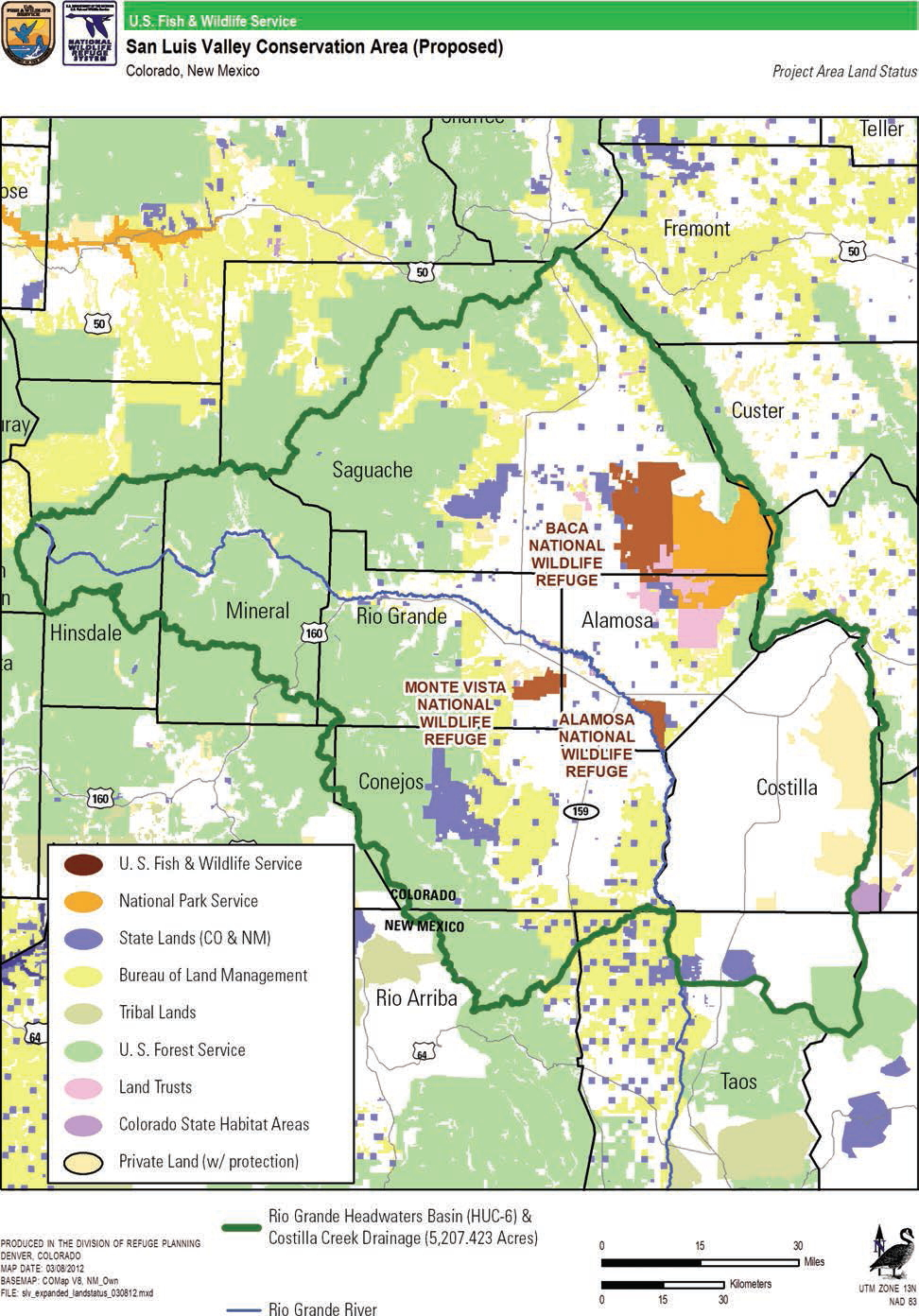
Map of the proposed San Luis Valley Conservation Area showing federal, state, and protected land use

About 50% of the 2,000,000 acres (810,000 ha) in the San Luis Valley is privately owned. Much of the land in the south part of the Valley, in Conejos and Costilla counties, was originally part of large Mexican land grants and is private land.

500,000 acres (200,000 ha) on the borders of the valley (generally adjacent to National Forest Lands) are managed by the Bureau of Land Management, BLM, a division of the United States Department of the Interior. This land is usually leased to neighboring ranches for grazing for a nominal fee. Part of the value of a ranch is its continuing lease of BLM or National Forest lands.

Public lands in the mountains surrounding the San Luis Valley are generally part of the Rio Grande National Forest and are managed by the United States Forest Service.

Large areas of private lands have either been subdivided into small "ranch" lots or have been sold or donated to the Federal government and make up portions of the Great Sand Dunes National Park and Preserve, other wildlife preserves, and various state wildlife sites.

=== Geology ===
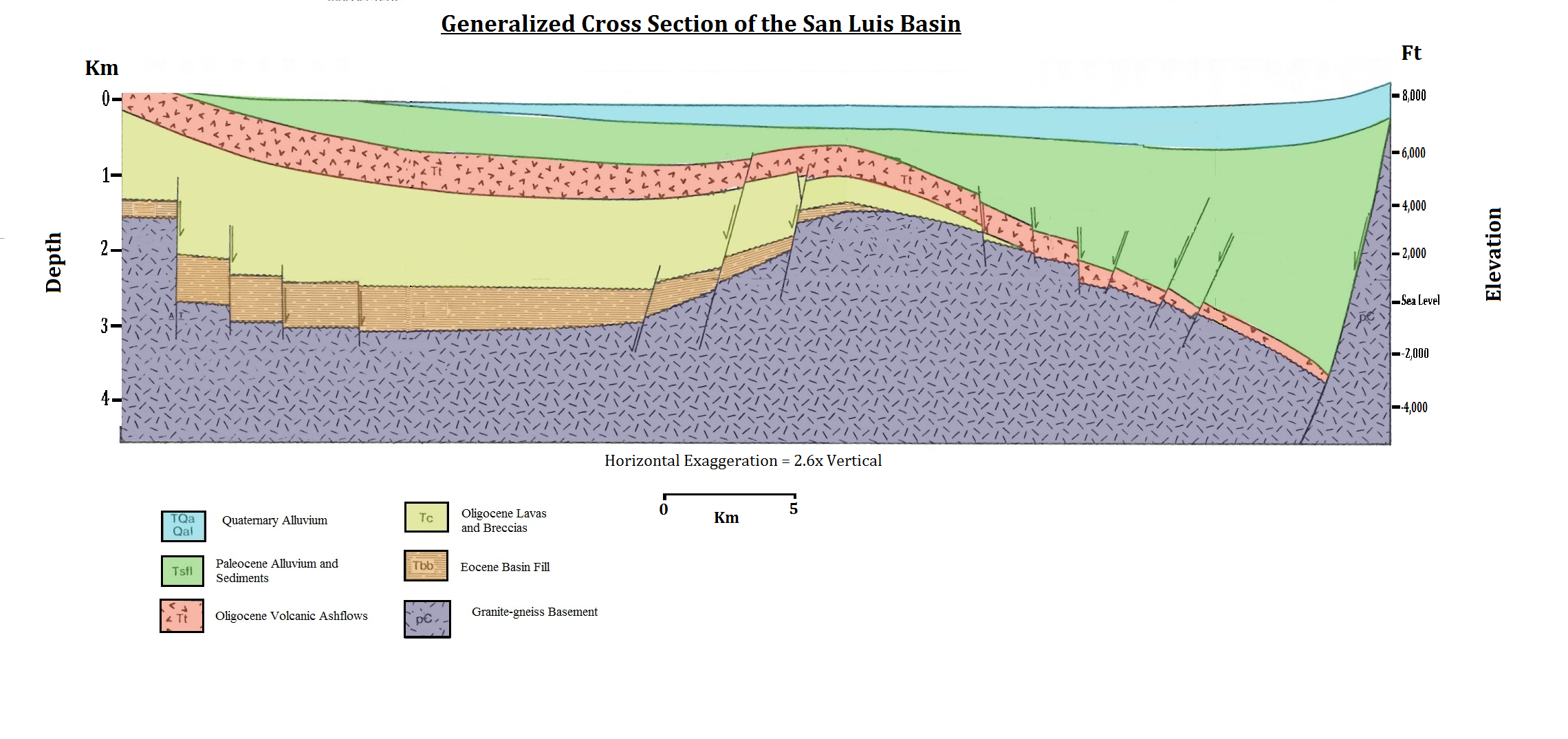
A generalized cross section of the San Luis basin from east to west.

The San Luis Valley contains an alluvial basin, the Alamosa Basin, which lies at the north end of the Rio Grande rift. Deposits include the deeper alluvial strata, overlying Precambrian basement rock, Eocene alluvial deposits from a shallow Laramide depression, the Blanco Basin Formation; and Oligocene ash and lava flows associated with the Conejos Formation, is the Santa Fe formation, mixed alluvium and lava outflows from the San Juan volcanic field to the west; later strata comprise the Alamosa formation, alternating layers of sand, gravel, and clay. The relatively impermeable clay layers trap ground water in the "confined aquifer" which, if tapped, supplies artesian wells. Surface waters, including the Rio Grande and other streams, are hydrologically connected to the "unconfined aquifer" a shallow ground water formation which underlies much of the valley. The deeper confined aquifers have sufficient hydrological connection with the surface waters of the valley that they are not considered for the purposes of Colorado water law "nontributary" waters which could legally be mined. Streams which flow into the valley, particularly the Rio Grande, have deposited alluvial fans where they emerge from higher terrain onto the valley floor.

Typical aquifer cross-section

==== Ancestral Rockies, the Central Colorado Trough, and the San Luis-Uncompahgre Highlands ====
The gap between the Precambrian basement rock and the Eocene alluvial deposits in the San Luis Valley is considered evidence that much of southern Colorado, including the western portion of the San Luis Valley, was highlands in the period prior to the Eocene Epoch, 56 to 34 million years ago. There were lowlands to the north in central Colorado, the Colorado sag, an east–west basin. It is from those highlands to the west, in Paleozoic, Pennsylvanian, and Permian times that the coarse alluvial deposits of the Sangre de Cristo Formation such as the Crestone Conglomerate originated. The Minturn Formation, a limestone formation exemplified at Marble Mountain on the crest of the Sangre de Cristos, is evidence of a sea in the Central Colorado Trough during the era of the Ancestral Rockies.

==== Western Interior Seaway ====
In the middle and late Cretaceous Period, about 100 million years ago, the San Luis Valley lay on the shore of or beneath the Western Interior Seaway, a shallow sea which divided North America into two parts. As the sea deepened and expanded sand and gravel eroded from mountains in the west was deposited in the Dakota Formation; later, when the sea was deeper mud and sand were deposited in the Mancos Shale. The Lexam oil play near Crestone is based on the hypothesis that there is oil trapped in Dakota Formation sandstones lying beneath Mancos Shale to the west of the Sangre de Cristo fault at the western base of the Sangre de Cristo Range southwest of Crestone. Drilling at the base of the range during gold exploration in the vicinity showed small amounts of oil and evidence of the existence of those formations as well as the underlying Morrison Formation. Prior to this discovery it was assumed that these formations had eroded away during the Laramide orogeny.

==== Laramide orogeny ====
Building of the Rocky Mountains by folding during the Laramide orogeny 80 to 55 million years ago created a highland, the San Luis-Brazos uplift, in the area of the San Luis Valley. This process over 30 million years resulted in an elevated and highly eroded peneplain where the San Luis Valley is today. There was a basin in its western portion which may have drained west through the course historically followed by the San Juan River. Sedimentary deposits formed in that basin during Eocene times remain in place beneath the western portion of the San Luis Valley. During the Pleistocene, parts of the valley were occupied by Lake Alamosa.

=== Agriculture and wildlife ===
Much of the land in the San Luis Valley is used for grazing. Farming is generally concentrated around the towns of Alamosa, Monte Vista and Center. Principal crops include potatoes, head lettuce, wheat, and barley. The barley grown here is the main supplier for Coors beer company. In 1982, quinoa was successfully grown for the first time outside of South America in the San Luis Valley of Colorado, and commercial growth has occurred since 1987. Less favored areas with a shorter growing season and less access to water rights tend to be devoted to alfalfa and grazing. Broad areas, especially in Saguache County, Colorado have a high water table or are even flooded part of the year. Uncultivated land is often covered with "chico", low brush such as rabbitbrush, greasewood and other woody species. Cropland is typically irrigated with large (1/4 mile radius) center-pivot irrigation systems, and a common feature of the Rio Grande Delta area where the Rio Grande enters the valley are large piles of potato-sized rocks screened from the soil.

The area supports a wide variety of wildlife. Sandhill cranes migrate through the valley every spring and fall. The Monte Vista Crane Festival takes place in March, centering on the Monte Vista National Wildlife Refuge located six miles (9.7 km) south of town. The valley is a flyway for many migrating birds including avocets, bald eagles, goldfinches, and a plethora of hawk species.

Agriculture in the San Luis Valley is enabled by irrigation, since average annual precipitation is just 7–10 inches (18–25 cm) whereas most ag crop production requires at least twice that much water. Surface water rights in the Valley began to be allocated in 1852, with the People's Ditch, near San Luis. In the 1870s, some 50,000 acres (78 sq mi; 200 km^{2}) of the San Luis Valley were irrigated, which rose to 800,000 acres (1,200 sq mi; 3,200 km^{2}) in the 1880s. By the early 1900s, demand for surface water had outstripped the available supply and farmers began to use subsurface wells to supply water. Over 5,000 groundwater wells existed by the time of World War I. By the early 1970s, water availability began to be limited, with the State enforcing a moratorium on new wells in much of the valley in 1972, and then completely ending new appropriations of water throughout the valley in 1981. The 1980s and 90s saw relatively bountiful water years in the valley, with drought conditions becoming the norm in the 2010s. As of 2021, water use cutbacks are anticipated due to a court order requiring the restoration of 400,000 acre-feet of water to the groundwater aquifer, as well as the forecast for reduced Rio Grande flows in future years.

== Economy ==
Predominantly agricultural in nature, the area is also one of the poorest rural areas of Colorado, with a poverty rate estimated at between 20 and 25% in 2019. The San Luis Valley Regional Medical Center is the largest employer in the valley, with over 600 employees.

Tourism has become a more important part of the economy in recent years, coupled with attempts to develop the area as a retirement destination. The arts are becoming an increasing force in expanding the economy of the San Luis Valley.

=== Tourist attractions ===
The San Luis Valley is home to the Great Sand Dunes National Park. The National Park is Open 24/7 year round. There are no timed entries or reservations to visit. The tallest dunes in North America are the centerpiece in a diverse landscape of grasslands, wetlands, forests, alpine lakes, and tundra. Stay on a moonless night to experience countless stars in this International Dark Sky Park.

Tourist attractions suggested by National Geographic Traveler include the Monte Vista Crane Festival in March, Los Caminos Antiguos, a regional road network, the Luther Bean Museum at Adams State University. Multiple Hot springs the Sand Dunes Swimming Pool Hot Spring and Joyful Journey Hot Springs. The Firedworks Gallery on Main Street in Alamosa for regional history and art, and regional Mexican food. Also recommended near Alamosa for wildlife viewing are The Alamosa Ranch north of town and the Alamosa National Wildlife Refuge to the southeast. To the northeast of Alamosa lie the San Luis Lakes State Wildlife Area, the San Luis Lakes and the Great Sand Dunes National Park (Note: To reach the Sand Dunes N.P., turn east at Mosca, Colorado from State Highway 17 onto State Highway 150. Near the Great Sand Dunes, where only camping is available, the Great Sand Dunes Lodge and the Nature Conservancy's Zapata Ranch are recommended for lodging. After viewing or visiting the Great Sand Dunes, one can travel south to Ft. Garland.)

At Fort Garland, Colorado south of the Great Sand Dunes on U.S. Highway 160 the Fort Garland Museum is recommended and further south on State Highway 159 at San Luis, Colorado, the oldest town in Colorado, the bronze sculptures by Huberto Maestas, depicting the Stations of the Cross. From San Luis, the National Geographic road trip suggests traveling west on State Highway 142 through Manassa, Colorado, then south on U.S. Highway 285 past Conejos, Colorado then west on State Highway 17 over Cumbres Pass to Chama, New Mexico paralleling the route of the narrow gauge Cumbres & Toltec Scenic Railroad.

Rock climbing and camping are available at Penitente Canyon and other locations. Rito Seco Park, located east of San Luis and named for a creek called Rito Seco, was established as a campground in the 1970s. However, it lacked hiking trails. Then in 2022, after more than a decade of planning, Costilla County and an organization called San Luis Valley Great Outdoors built three hiking trails and one single track mountain bike trail in the park.

The San Luis Valley is also home to the Colorado Gator Reptile Rescue. The Reptile rescue is open to the public to view and interact with many different types of reptiles from Gators to Tortoises. The rescue uses thermal hot springs water to maintain the gators through the winter months and is home to Morris the Movie Star Gator

=== Art community ===
There are over 500 known artists living in the San Luis Valley as evidenced by an ongoing directory maintained by Monte Vista artists' group, The Art Thing, The Art Thing's membership boasts several nationally recognized artists working in various media. Monte Vista is also home to the Monte Arts Council as well as several festivals and an art tour that attracts artists from as far away as California and North Carolina. The arts of the San Luis Valley draw from traditions of the early Utes, Apaches, and Comanches and the later Spanish-speaking immigrants.

The San Luis Valley is home to five active live theaters, two at Adams State University, The Creede Repertory Theater, The Old Spanish Trails Theatre Company and Rocky Mountain Stage in Monte Vista. In August there are two major Music Festivals, the Spanish Trails Music Festival and Mexican Rodeo, and Rhythms on the Rio. Music in the valley is sponsored by the South Fork Music Association and the Alamosa Live Music Association.

=== Solar energy ===
The San Luis Valley is an alpine desert environment which is conducive to solar energy production. It has the highest per capita concentration of home-based solar energy systems in the United States. Colorado law requires that 30% of the power used in the state be generated from renewable sources by 2020. It also requires that 3% of the power generated be used at or near where it is generated; i.e. distributed generation.

There are also a number of utility-scale photovoltaic power stations in the valley, and an active market in selling or leasing land to be used for solar facilities. In 2007, SunEdison constructed the 7.7 megawatt Alamosa Photovoltaic Power Plant on about 80 acres near the town of Mosca, Colorado. It was the largest grid-connected solar electric facility in the United States at that time. It was followed in 2010 by the 19 megawatt Greater Sandhill Solar Plant, in 2011 by the 30 megawatt San Luis Valley Solar Ranch, in 2012 by the 30 megawatt Alamosa Solar Generating Project, and in 2015 by the 50 megawatt Hooper Solar PV Power Plant. All are located on previously developed agricultural lands near Mosca.

On 11 December 2009, more than 125 people gathered to respond to a proposal by Tessera Solar (affiliated with Stirling Energy Systems) to install 8,000 parabolic mirrors, 40 feet each, on 1,500 acres (6.1 km^{2}) near Saguache, Colorado. At issue was the noise expected to be generated by the numerous stirling engine generators, and the wisdom of industrial solar facilities in general. The application for a permit was withdrawn on 11 July 2011. There has also been controversy regarding proposed transmission lines over both Poncha and La Veta passes, which would open the door to much more industrial solar development. Opposition to a proposed transmission line has resulted in possible delays in development of solar facilities by Xcel Energy which together with Tri-State Generation and Transmission Association serves the valley. In 2012, the United States Department of Interior designated several Solar Energy Zones on BLM lands in the valley, although no projects have yet been announced to be in development.

== Demography ==
A significant portion of the residents of the San Luis Valley are Hispanic with historic populations in Costilla and Conejos counties which were settled by early migrants from New Mexico. There are a few Native Americans in the valley. There are small Amish communities which were recently established.

Much of the grazing land on the floor of the valley is of little value. In Costilla County, large tracts of land have been subdivided into 5 acre plots. 35 acre plots are also common in the valley as a 35-acre plot allows drilling a well to water a garden and livestock. These have been sold to homesteaders who often live off-the-grid.

La Puente, headquartered in Alamosa offers social services to the homeless and others in the valley.

== Higher education ==
Adams State University, a four-year state college at Alamosa, with approximately 3,500 students, is the major educational institution in the Valley. It is supplemented by a campus of Trinidad State College in Alamosa.

== Health ==
San Luis Valley Regional Medical Center is a full service Acute-Care hospital and specialty physician clinic.

A locally conducted survey of public health statistics showed a considerable deficiency with respect to most measures of public health. There is a deficiency of medical providers, for example, 106 physicians per 100,000 compared to the Colorado average of 278.
