= Deborah Martinez-Martinez =

Chicana scholar and author (born 1954)

Deborah Martinez-Martinez (born 1954) is CEO of the publisher Vanishing Horizons and is an author who explores the history of the Southwestern United States. She worked in higher education admissions and recruitment for twenty years and advocates for more Chicanas in education.

== Biography ==
Martinez-Martinez grew up on a farm in Huerfano Valley in the 1960s. She had a very large Catholic family. Her mother was Rose Lucero Martinez, who instilled in her a love of reading and learning from a young age. She is a descendant of settlers who came to Colorado in the 1860s from Arroyo Hondo and Taos Mountain Trail regions of New Mexico. As a child she played with paper dolls that taught her about cultures of different peoples, which inspired her later book Chicana Activists of Colorado.

Martinez graduated from Walsenburg High school in 1972. She received her BA from University of Southern Colorado in 1976, her MA from University of Northern Colorado in 1982, and PhD from University of Colorado Denver in 2001.

Martinez-Martinez worked for the local Pueblo Chicano newspaper, La Cucaracha. This is where she met other leaders in the Chicano community like Rita J. Martinez.

Deborah worked for Colorado State University at Pueblo as an admissions recruiter for 20 years. She also recruited for the League of United Latin American Citizens (LULAC). She was co-coordinator of the Las Hermanas program, which provides guidance and mentorship for Chicanas in higher education. She retired from CSU Pueblo in 2004.

Martinez-Martinez worked with Ray Aguilera as he created the Pueblo Hispanic Education Foundation (PHEF). She was interim director, and on the board of PHEF for 10 years. Through this connection, she co-produced the show Hispanidad on the local PBS channel. She has been involved with the Pueblo History Museum, serving as a historical interpreter and a founding member of the Fray Angelico Chávez Chapter of the Genealogy Society of Hispanic America.

She currently serves on the board of El Movimiento Sigue (The Movement Continues), a social justice organization. Martinez has been part of the group's advocacy towards removing the Christopher Columbus statue in the city of Pueblo.

In 2010, she was inspired by Charlene Garcia Simms' own publishing company and founded Vanishing Horizons Publishing with Robert Pacheco. She has published 11 books with Vanishing Horizons. She edited and published El Movimiento de Pueblo: An Anthology of Chicana and Chicano Acitivism in 2016 to illuminate the efforts of organizers in southern Colorado.

Her 2020 book Chicana Activists of Colorado was a groundbreaking art book that included paper dolls of the women with biographies and cultural backgrounds. The book was designed with separate pages that can be removed and cut out, for readers to cut out the dolls and use them on their own.

In 2018, Martinez-Martinez suffered a lung collapse and in 2019 received a double lung transplant at the University of Colorado transplant center in Denver.

== Published works ==
- The cultural context of leadership : ethnic culture, leadership development and Colorado chicanas and chicanos, Thesis 2001
- Trade on the Taos Mountain Trail, 2010 ISBN 978-0982344507
- El movimiento de Pueblo : an anthology of Chicana and Chicano activism, 2016 ISBN 978-0982344514
- Chicana activists of Colorado : powerful women paper dolls and their stories, 2020 ISBN 978-0982344583

== Recognition ==
In 2023, she was recognized by History Colorado as a Corn Mother for her social justice work.

Her book Chicana Activists was a finalist for the Colorado Book Awards in 2021.
