= Arlette Lucero =

American visual artist, educator and illustrator

Arlette Lucero is an American visual artist, educator, and illustrator.

In 2012, she was inducted as a Corn Mother for her community involvement and support.

== Background ==
Rooting from the mid-twentieth century and based in Denver, Colorado, Arlette Lucero is co-founder and previous education director of the Chicano Humanities and Arts Council (CHAC), an art organization in Denver that displays Chicanx art as temporary exhibitions. She has been self-employed since 1976. Lucero expresses her Chicana heritage through her artwork, including photography, illustration, and computer art. She also participated in Journey Through Our Heritage (JTOH), Arts Street, Voz y Corazón, KidzArt, and the Museo de las Americas. For more than 15 years, Lucero has fulfilled the role of an art educator in her home state of Colorado, and she spent 7 of those years teaching at the Escuela de Guadalupe in Denver. Lucero taught about art murals, traditional art, and painting.

Lucero earned her bachelor's degree in fine arts from Colorado State University and pursued graphic arts at the Community College of Denver. Lucero possesses more than 30 years of experience as a professional artist. Her experience includes children’s book illustrations, fine art, crafting, and graphic art.

In 2024, Lucero was a curator for the Dia de Muertos Art Show in Denver which displayed the art of 30 local Chicanx artists to nearby communities. The Day of the Dead event was open to the public free of charge with the goal of honoring cultural traditions of the Chicanx community in Denver.

== Works ==
=== Chicana ===
The art piece Chicana portrays a woman and a tree. Many patterns and designs are a combination of Spanish-style patterns and American symbols. This includes the colors of the American flag and the Mexican flag, as well as words such as "Freedom" and "Chicano". The woman in the art piece is shown to be carrying a flaming heart that is surrounded by barbed wire and a cross. The mix of hummingbirds and bald eagles in the art supposedly demonstrates Chicano, an American first with cultures of Mexican descent.

=== Juanita Dominguez ===
In 2019, Lucero began a trio of expansive murals during her tenure as the Artist in Residence. Among these is Juanita Dominguez, a tribute created with guidance from the El Movimiento Advisory Committee. In the center of the piece is the phrase "Yo Soy Chicano. Tengo Color..." surrounds the featured Chicana, translating to "I am Chicano. I have Color...".

=== Dia de Los Muertos ===
The artwork Dia de Los Muertos, with Chicanx cultural traditions, features a woman dressed up as a living "calavera", or sugar skull, which is often placed on the "Ofrenda," the heart of the celebration. The Ofrenda is intended to be interpreted as a symbolic bridge between the living and the dead.

=== Unapologetic Chicana ===
In 2024, Lucero exhibited her piece, Unapologetic Chicana, at the Alto Gallery in Denver, Colorado. Lucero describes how this painting reflects her experience growing up in Denver as one of the only Chicana girls in her community. Lucero's early life experiences were immersed in White culture. However, later on in her life as a teenager, she was exposed to elements of her Mexican culture through a summer school program she attended. This was the start of Lucero self identifying as a Chicana. Unapologetic Chicana represents who Lucero is culturally as a Chicana through her artwork. It shows the pride Lucero has in her culture, regardless of whether or not her work fits into the demands of mainstream art.

=== Other Tummy Tales Series Book Illustrations ===
In 2004, Lucero created illustrations for a children's book for the very first time. Her illustrations in Chili Today, Hot Tamale and Other Tummy Tales provided Lucero with a breakthrough to work on future book illustrations. She was later recruited to create illustrations for an additional children's book, Ole! Pozole! & Other Tummy Tales.
