= Museum of the Americas =

Museum of the Americas may refer to:

- Art Museum of the Americas, an art museum of the Organization of American States (OAS) in Washington, DC
- Dance Art Museum of the Americas, a dance art museum in Santa Fe, New Mexico, USA
- Gilcrease Museum, a.k.a. "Gilcrease: The Museum of the Americas", an art and history museum in Tulsa, Oklahoma, USA
- Museo de las Americas (Denver), a fine arts museum in Denver, Colorado
- Museo de las Américas (San Juan), a contemporary art museum in San Juan, Puerto Rico
- Museum of the Americas (Florida), a contemporary art museum in Doral, Florida, USA
- Museum of the Americas (Madrid), a pre-Columbian art history museum (Museo de América) in Madrid, Spain
- Museum of the Americas (Texas), a Native American heritage museum in Weatherford, Texas, USA
