= The Corn Mothers =

The Corn Mothers and Return of the Corn Mothers: Inspiring Women of the Southwest exhibits are traveling exhibits honoring women in the southwestern U.S.

Corn Mothers are Indigenous Mexican deity-figures that represent growth, community, and sustenance. The honorees are Corn Mothers "who have become the backbones of their community. They provide their own types of sustenance, whether that be through their own community work or support of other community members," according to curator Renee Fajardo.

The project began in Denver in 2007 with a small grant from the Rocky Mountain Women's Institute. Eight women were honored in the first year. Fajardo wanted to keep alive the stories and oral history of important aunties in her life, and it expanded to include women in the community.

The creators of the project are curator Fajardo, photographer Todd Pierson, editor Ed Winograd, and graphic designer Toinette Brown. The project was supported by the Chicano Humanities Arts Council; the Colorado Folks Arts Council; MSU Denver’s Department of Chicana/o Studies, the MSU Denver Office of Diversity and Inclusion, the Journey Through Our Heritage program and U.S. Bank.

The Return of the Corn Mothers exhibit book was a 2021 Indie Book Awards Publishing Finalist for Coffee Table Book/Photography and Anthology.

== Honorees ==
Corn Mothers
Name	Image	Birth–Death	Year	Location	Ref(s)
Elizabeth Aragon-Blanton		(b. 1969)	2019	Rye, Colorado	
Amy Banker			2012	Denver, Colorado	
Lois Burrell			2008	Brighton, Colorado	
Barbara Clark			2010	Cascabel, Arizona	
Maria de la Cruz			2012	Aguilar, Colorado	
Dawn DiPrince			2019	Pueblo, Colorado	
Amy Duncan			2008	Gila, New Mexico	
Kristy Duran			2016	Alamosa, Colorado	
Claudia Ebel			2016	Alamosa, Colorado	
Geneva Escobedo		(b. 1949)	2010	Tucson, Arizona	
Nellie Escobedo Plasencio		(1925-2014)	2010	Safford, Arizona	
Dora Esquibel		(1937-2012)	2012	Denver, Colorado	
Ann Esquibel Redman			2019	Cheyenne, Wyoming	
Belinda Garcia		=	2012	Crestone, Colorado	
Concepción Garcia Allen			2008	Santa Fe, New Mexico	
Peggy Godfrey			2016	Moffat, Colorado	
Carol Guerrero-Murphy			2016	Alamosa, Colorado	
Ivette Guzman			2008	Denton, Texas	
Lois Harvey			2008	Denver, Colorado	
Carrie Howell			2008	Wheat Ridge, Colorado	
Sylvia Lee		(b. 1958)	2013	Tucson, Arizona	
Arlette Lucero			2012	Denver, Colorado	
Lucy Lucero		(1919-2010)	2008	Denver, Colorado	
Oneyda L. Maestas			2016	Alamosa, Colorado	
Brenda Kay Manuelito			2010	Phoenix, Arizona	
Tori Vigil Martinez			2016	Capulin, Colorado	
Rita J. Martinez		(1955-2020)	2019	Pueblo, Colorado	
B. Afeni McNeely Cobham			2012	Denver, Colorado	
Carolina “Carrie” Sandoval Mejía		(1922-2009)	2008	Rye, Colorado	
Raven Winston Mercado		(b. 1970)	2010	Tucson, Arizona	
Judy Newland			2010	Niwot, Colorado	
Cynthia Ramu		(b. 1953)	2019	Pueblo, Colorado	
Sara Ransom		(b. 1946)	2008	Durango, Colorado	
Ella Maria Ray			2012	Denver, Colorado	
Alfiria Casaus (Alfie) Salazar		(1935-2023)	2019	Pueblo, Colorado	
Lisa Saldaña			2019	Denver, Colorado	
Cherie Karo Schwartz			2008	Denver, Colorado	
Barbara Shannon-Bannister			2008	Aurora, Colorado	
Christina Maxine Sigala		(b. 1953)	2012	Denver, Colorado	
Patricia Sigala			2008	Santa Fe, New Mexico	
Charlene Garcia Simms			2019	Garcia, Colorado	
Stella Teller		(b. 1929)	2008	Isleta Pueblo, New Mexico	
Jessica Tumposky			2008	Silver City, New Mexico	
Evelyn Valdez Martinez			2008	Denver, Colorado	
Bertha A. Velarde		(1957-2018)	2016	Alamosa, Colorado	
Aurora Villareal-Aguilera		(1945-2019)	2010	Phoenix, Arizona	
Rita Flores de Wallace			2008	Denver, Colorado	
Ellen Alires-Trujillo		(1952-2023)	2022	Boulder, Colorado	
Batkhishig Batochir		(b. 1969)	2022	Denver, Colorado	
Genevieve Canales			2022	Greeley, Colorado	
Alicia Cardenas		(1977-2021)	2022	Denver, Colorado	
Tina Cartagena		(b. 1953)	2022	Denver, Colorado	
Connie Margaret Coca		(b. 1943)	2022	Laramie, Wyoming	
Juliana Aragón Fatula			2022	Cañon City, Colorado	
Karen D. Gonzales			2022	Denver, Colorado	
Norma Johnson			2022	Boulder, Colorado	
Elena Holly Klaver			2022	Niwot, Colorado	
Lucha Aztzin Martínez de Luna			2022	Golden, Colorado	
Deborah Martinez-Martinez			2022	Rye, Colorado	
Jennifer McBride			2022	Parker, Colorado	
Laura (Laurita) Naranjo			2022	Denver, Colorado	
Adrienne Norris			2022	Denver, Colorado	
Erica Padilla			2022	Denver, Colorado	
Jo Elizabeth Pinto			2022	Brighton, Colorado	
Sandra Ortega		(b. 1952)	2022	San Luis, Colorado	
Shirley Romero Otero		(b. 1955)	2022	San Luis, Colorado	
Evangeline Roybal Sena			2022	Blanca, Colorado	
Marge Taniwaki			2022	Denver, Colorado	
Jeanette Trujillo-Lucero			2022	Denver, Colorado	
