= Renee Fajardo =

Educator, artist, and activist in Denver, CO (born 1958)

- Born: 1958 (age 67–68); Denver, CO
- Education: Peru State College, University of Nebraska College of Law
- Occupations: Author and educator
- Spouse: Glen Anstine
- Children: Kali Fajardo-Anstine

Renee Fajardo (born 1958) is an author, educator, and activist in Denver, Colorado. She is currently a faculty in Chicano Studies at Metropolitan State University Denver. She is the mother of author Kali Fajardo-Anstine.

== Biography ==
Elizabeth Renee Fajardo was born to parents in Denver, Colorado. She grew up in Curtis Park at her grandparents' house, before her family moved north into Adams County. Her parents divorced when she was young and they shared custody of Fajardo and her brother.

She has Chicana/Native American, Filipino, and Jewish heritage.

At 8 years old, Fajardo's family moved to Adams County in an all-white neighborhood. Fajardo faced racist backlash from her neighbors which resulted in the murder of her kittens. The family moved after that incident, and it influenced Fajardo's future anti-racist work.

Her family faced racism throughout her childhood. They continued to move to different suburbs, and Fajardo's father enrolled her in karate classes. In middle school, Fajardo's mother got a job in Grand Island, Nebraska, and they moved.

Fajardo was the first Hispanic person to be voted onto her high school student council.

Fajardo attended Peru State College in Nebraska, then graduated from University of Nebraska College of Law. She became a lawyer in order to "be a champion for other people."

=== Expanded description ===
After passing the bar exam, Fajardo moved back to Denver and spent her time supporting the community's legal needs instead of starting a law practice. She found a niche working with performers and artists.

Fajardo was the director behind the Crossover Project, which provided multicultural entertainment for after-school programs. She continued and expanded the Cultural Concerts on Colfax series, and her portfolio of programs continued to grow. Fajardo worked at Aurora Fox Fine Arts Center and planned multicultural entertainment and education for school groups.

She is chair of the Chicano Humanities and Arts Council (CHAC).

Fajardo and Carl Ruby co-created the Tummy Tales books, a series of children's books that explore culture through food.

She is the co-founder of The Corn Mothers exhibition. Fajardo was inspired by a book that her husband purchased, When Jesus Came, the Corn Mothers Went Away. In Pueblo culture, Corn Mothers were givers of life and are synonymous with Mother Earth. Fajardo worked with photographer Todd Pierson to recognize and celebrate women in the southwest that nurtured and supported their communities. Corn Mothers exhibit originally opened in 2009, and "Return of the Corn Mothers" opened in 2022, adding 22 more honorees.

The project received a Colorado Endowment for the Humanities Award in 2009.

She is the director of Metropolitan State University's "Journey Through Our Heritage" program since 2010.

=== Personal life ===
Fajardo got married when she was 17, before her senior year of high school. The marriage ended when she was attending college. They had one child together.

Fajardo met Glen Anstine during law school, and they married in 1985. They have 7 children together including Kali Fajardo-Anstine.

Fajardo was the niece of Lucy Lucero.

== Published works ==
- Fajardo R. Ruby C. & Millis L. (1997). Holy molé guacamole! : & other tummy tales. Baskun Books.
- Fajardo R. Ruby C. & Wasinger H. (2002). Pinch a lotta enchiladas & other tummy tales. Jems Books.
- Fajardo R. Ruby C. Winograd E. Lucero A. & Polk M. (2004). Chili today hot tamale : & other tummy tales. JEMS Books.
- Fajardo R. Ruby C. & Lucero A. (2005). Olé! posole! & other tummy tales. Jems Books.
- Fajardo R. Ruby C. Winograd E. & Lucero A. (2016). Frijoles elotes y chipotles oh my! : & other tummy tales. JEMS Books.
- Fajardo R. Ruby C. Winograd E. & Lucero A. (2018). Biscochitos for mis jitos : & other tummy tales. JEMS Books.
- Fajardo R. Pierson T. Winograd E. & Return of the Corn Mothers Project. (2020). Return of the corn mothers : inspiring women of the southwest. Renee Fajardo.
- Fajardo R. Ruby C. & Gallegos M. (2021). No pepperonis! just chicharrones! : and other tummy tales. JEMS Books.

== Recognition ==
Fajardo received the MLK Peace Award in 2017 from Metropolitan State University Denver.
