= 2021 Denver and Lakewood shootings =

Spree shooting in Colorado, U.S.

- Location: 39°43′2.424″N 104°49′14.632″W; Denver, Colorado, U.S. Lakewood, Colorado, U.S.
- Date: December 27, 2021; 4 years ago c. 5:25 p.m. – 6:12 p.m. (UTC-6)
- Target: Personal acquaintances (with one exception), including former colleagues, co-workers and business partners
- Attack type: spree shooting; home invasion
- Weapons: 5.56×45mm NATO Palmetto State Armory PA-15 Marauder AR-15–style pistol; 9×19mm Parabellum Smith & Wesson M&P Shield Semi-automatic pistol
- Deaths: 6 (including the perpetrator)
- Injuries: 2
- Perpetrators: Lyndon James McLeod (also known as Roman McClay)
- Defender: Officer Ashley Ferris

On December 27, 2021, a mass shooting occurred in downtown Denver and later moved to Lakewood, Colorado, United States, where 47-year-old Lyndon McLeod fatally shot five people and wounded two others. McLeod was ultimately killed by Lakewood Police Agent Ashley Ferris, after the two exchanged gunfire. Ferris had been shot and wounded by McLeod but was able to return fire from the ground.

McLeod, who knew most of his victims from the tattoo and cannabis scenes, held extremist and misogynistic views. He had been investigated by law enforcement in 2020 and 2021, but did not have any charges filed against him. During the years that preceded the shootings, McLeod had gained some fame by self-publishing a trilogy of science fiction novels under the pen name Roman McClay. The plot of those books involved scenes where the protagonist, named after the author, killed three of the people McLeod eventually targeted in real life.

== Shootings and police response ==
=== Denver ===
At 5:25 p.m., Denver Police received 911 calls that reported a shooting inside of a local business, Sol Tribe Tattoo and Piercing. When police officers arrived at the scene, they found two women shot dead, the shop's owner Alicia Cardenas and one of its employees, Alyssa Gunn-Maldonado. Another employee, Jimmy Maldonado, was the third person shot by McLeod in the shop. He was hit in the neck and shoulder, and survived after being hospitalized.

Around 5:30 p.m., Denver Police were notified of a home intrusion, a couple blocks away from Sol Tribe Tattoo and Piercing. McLeod, posing as a delivery man, had tried to enter into the apartment of tattoo artist Jeremy Costilow. However, Costilow's girlfriend got suspicious and said Costilow did not live there. McLeod came back after a few minutes and started hitting the door with a sledgehammer to force his way in. He then fired shots through the door and walls as Costilow and his girlfriend escaped with their child. McLeod managed to enter the apartment only after Costilow and his family had fled; he shot belongings and set their van on fire before leaving the premises.

Around 5:45 p.m., McLeod shot and killed building contractor Michael Swinyard at his home near Cheesman Park. The police pronounced Swinyard dead at the scene. Denver police were able to get a description of McLeod's van as he fled the scene and shared it with neighboring police departments.

Around 5:50 p.m. at the intersection of 8th Avenue and Zuni Street, McLeod and a Denver police officer exchanged fire. The officer's police car was disabled during the gunfire, but no one was injured. McLeod was able to flee to Lakewood. This was the last event that took place in the City of Denver.

=== Lakewood ===
At 5:58 p.m., McLeod entered the Lucky 13 Tattoo Parlor and fired a whole magazine, killing Danny Scofield, a tattoo artist working there. Less than ten seconds later, McLeod left the shop. He then travelled to the Ted's Montana Grill in the Belmar shopping district, where he forced his way behind the counter and poured himself a drink. When a staff member confronted him, McLeod threatened him with a pistol, yelling "Guess who's in charge? It ain't you, bitch!" McLeod then left without shooting anyone.

Police officers spotted McLeod's van near the Wells Fargo bank before seeing McLeod himself leaving Ted's nearby. A gunfight ensued, but no one was hit. Around 6:10 p.m., McLeod fled to the Hyatt House Hotel, where he got into a short argument with the desk clerk, Sarah Steck, before fatally shooting her and leaving in less than thirty seconds.

Around 6:15 p.m., McLeod encountered Lakewood police officer Ashley Ferris. According to Ferris' account, she then had a hunch that McLeod could be the suspect in the shootings. As she approached McLeod, Ferris saw him reaching for his waistband. Ferris said "Don't do this": McLeod answered "I'll show you what I do", and opened fire on Ferris. McLeod's bullet went all the way through Ferris' abdomen, damaging her sciatic nerve and paralyzing her in her right leg. On the ground, Ferris returned fire, hitting McLeod three times. McLeod attempted to run, but collapsed behind Ferris' patrol car. Forty seconds later, another officer arrived to pull Ferris to safety. Three other officers surrounded the downed McLeod, who rolled onto his back from his side. He was pronounced dead at the scene.

According to the autopsy report, McLeod was shot in the chest, right thigh, and left foot. The single bullet to his chest was the fatal wound.

Searching McLeod's van, police discovered an arsenal of weapons and ammunition, as well as his tactical gear, motorcycle, and two sets of handcuffs.

== Victims ==
The five victims killed included three women: Sarah Steck, 28, Alyssa Gunn-Maldonado, 35, and Alicia Cardenas, 44; and two men: Danny Scofield, 38 and Michael Swinyard, 67. McLeod had been acquainted to all of his victims except for Steck, who was merely present at the desk of the Hyatt House hotel when McLeod entered. Steck was not supposed to work that shift and had been filling in for a sick colleague.

The injured included Jimmy Maldonado, the husband of Alyssa Gunn-Maldonado. Jimmy Maldonado was shot twice, once through his collarbone and once through the top of a lung. Maldonado was the only survivor of the three people shot at Sol Tribe Tattoo and Piercing. The second person injured was Lakewood Police Agent Ashley Ferris, a three-year veteran at the time, who was shot in the abdomen by McLeod.

== Perpetrator ==
Lyndon James McLeod, also known under his pen name Roman McClay (Note: A play on roman à clef.) (January 7, 1974 — December 27, 2021), was an American author and former business owner living in and around Denver, Colorado. According to his autobiographical writings, he grew up as an "army brat" and spent some time overseas before attending high school in Ohio. In his mid-twenties, he was a member of the Zendik Farm community for about a year, leaving in 1999.

=== Business career and connections to the victims ===
According to a Vice News investigation, McLeod settled in Denver in the mid-2000s and first made a living there cultivating cannabis. In 2012, he pleaded guilty to felony menacing after threatening with a gun two men who worked with him in a medical marijuana warehouse. The charge was dismissed after he completed two years of probation as part of a deferred sentence. Between 2013 and 2015, he had been the co-owner of All Heart Industries (which also used the name Flat Black Ink Corp.), a tattoo parlor located at the address later occupied by Sol Tribe Tattoo and Piercing. Though he employed professionals, McLeod himself was never licensed as a tattoo artist or tattoo shop owner.

McLeod had not been successful in the tattoo scene. This seems to have been due in part to his abrasive personality and aggressive behavior towards employees. Costilow, who had known for years McLeod as a client, had helped him start up All Heart Industries but their association had quickly soured. McLeod later deeply resented Costilow over their falling out and also became convinced that Costilow was dating his former girlfriend. At some point, McLeod's ex-girlfriend had warned Costilow that McLeod wanted to kill him; Costilow had not taken this seriously and just assumed that McLeod would be looking for a fight with him.

Scofield also had been employed at McLeod's tattoo parlor. Maldonado said that McLeod had visited Sol Tribe Tattoo and Piercing once in 2017, trying to ingratiate himself with the new owners of his former space; he had left in frustration after Cardenas and Maldonado gave him the cold shoulder.

According to McLeod's girlfriend, Swinyard had worked with McLeod in cannabis, in what may have been an illegal operation; McLeod felt Swinyard had cheated him as a business partner.

Even though McLeod did not know Steck, he had had an issue with Lakewood's Hyatt House Hotel one month before the shootings, when he was not allowed to use a prepaid gift card to pay for his stay.

=== Career as an author ===
After his business failed, McLeod lived for several years on a property he had bought on a mountain outside Denver, first in a tent, then in a house he built from shipping containers. There, he wrote and self-published between 2018 and 2020 a three-volume science fiction novel numbering several thousand pages, titled Sanction. The plot involves a man, named "Lyndon MacLeod", who murders 46 people as revenge for the double-crossing and pettiness he has faced. Several other characters are fictionalized versions of the author, or mouthpieces for his ideas. The novel, which mixes fiction, philosophical digressions and misanthropic and misogynistic musings, also contains threats to Ben Shapiro, Sam Harris, Black Lives Matter as well as several of McLeod's real-life victims. The latter are called by their names and even their real addresses are mentioned in the text. McLeod described murdering Swinyard, and mentioned killing Cardenas. He also described murdering Costilow, whose name is mentioned numerous times in the books. During a 2019 podcast appearance, McLeod said that he considered Sanction as his "Plan B", a creative way of expressing his rage towards those whom he felt had betrayed him.

The victims were apparently unaware that they were named in McLeod's novel. Six months before his murder spree, McLeod had left flyers advertising his novel in front of Costilow's shop, but Costilow had not read it.

The books were available on Amazon before being taken down two days after the shooting. McLeod had also made a 47-minute video called Warhorse, where he was the narrator and sole participant and which appeared to show preparations for his crimes.

McLeod's books had become popular in some manosphere communities. He would occasionally host fans at his Colorado home to discuss his books and his philosophy. McLeod exalted the virtues of "alpha males", off-the-grid lifestyle and "male honor violence" and called himself a "sigma male", meaning by that an alpha male loner or a "rugged individualist". According to the Anti-Defamation League, McLeod "adhered to a smaller subset of the manosphere that focuses on hyper-masculinity" and considers that "alpha males" are being denied their rightul leading place in society by weak "beta males" and women. He expressed "ultra-traditionalist" views towards women, whom he viewed as inferior to men in many respects. While he advocated premarital chastity for women, he stated that alpha and sigma males should have "harems".

In his online statements, McLeod praised far-right, white nationalist and accelerationist movements such as the Boogaloo Boys and the Wolves of Vinland, and expressed admiration for manosphere personalities Bronze Age Pervert and Jack Donovan. He opened Sanction with an epigram from Donovan, whom he said was a major influence on his writings. Though McLeod's statements and writings contained racist remarks, his views had not evolved to full white supremacy as he paid tribute to non-white "warrior" cultures such as the Comanche or the Maori, or historical figures like Toussaint Louverture. An article published by Bellingcat summed up McLeod's ideas as a form of ecofascism, combined with antisemitic views of the media and vague anti-imperialist and anarchist notions.

McLeod frequently interacted with Bronze Age Pervert's Twitter account, sharing photos and quotes of the book Bronze Age Mindset. In 2020, McLeod was interviewed on Donovan's podcast. Donovan later condemned the 2021 shootings, calling McLeod's actions "pointless and sad". Zuby, a right-wing rapper, also hosted McLeod on his podcast and promoted McLeod's books.

In April 2020, McLeod was questioned by the FBI for threatening on Twitter to kill fellow author Travis Corcoran and his family, after Corcoran insulted one of his friends' writings. Following that incident, McLeod left Colorado for a time; during several months, he was the roommate of a female fan in Louisiana. Eventually, McLeod's roommate became so concerned about his behavior that she asked him to leave. She also reached out to police in Denver and in Louisiana to warn them that McLeod had told her he wanted to attack buildings with flamethrowers. She later told Vice News that she believed McLeod wanted to "start a war with his final actions and inspire people to take down the system". At that point, McLeod's finances were dwindling and he had racked up considerable credit card debt, which may have contributed to his increasingly dangerous tone.

In January 2021, a German man who had been a fan of McLeod's books had alerted the Denver police department after interacting with McLeod in a private chat room and becoming worried that he might commit violent acts in real life.

== Aftermath ==
On December 29, 2021, a memorial was held outside Sol Tribe Tattoo and Piercing to honor the victims of the shooting. Family members and community members lit candles and laid memorials down at foot of the storefront.

McLeod's family released a statement, saying that he had been estranged from them for years and mourning the victims of his attack. The statement read: "The losses Monday are evidence of the deep need for a system geared toward helping mentally-ill individuals."

Ashley Ferris, the Lakewood police officer who shot and killed McLeod after sustaining a bullet from McLeod's gun, was named the Officer of the Month for June by the National Law Enforcement Officers Memorial Fund. The Lakewood Police Department awarded Ferris the Purple Heart and Medal of Distinguished Service.

In November 2022, the Chicano Murals of Colorado Project released a documentary called These Storied Walls as a tribute to Alicia Cardenas. Parts of the documentary, featuring Cardenas, were filmed five weeks before the shooting took place. In October 2022, Cardenas was featured in a special exhibit at the History Colorado Center, called The Return of the Corn Mother's Exhibit. Several murals of Cardenas were painted around Denver, by her friends and other artists.

McLeod's actions were praised online by some neo-fascist and white supremacist groups and individuals.
