= Alicia Cardenas =

Indigenous Mexican American artist (1977–2021)

Alicia Cardenas (March 22, 1977 – December 27, 2021) was an Indigenous Mexican American painter, muralist, educator, activist, body piercer, and community organizer. She became a tattoo artist with her own business at a young age and was noted for being a Chicana feminist artist in Denver's male-dominated tattoo scene. She served on the Board of Directors for the Association of Professional Piercers from 2005 to 2008 as President and 2002 to 2005 as International Liaison. She owned the Sol Tribe tattoo shop, which had been a longstanding feature of Denver. She was featured in a documentary on Chicano muralism by the Chicano Murals of Colorado Project, referred to as These Storied Walls. In her community, she was known as "Mama Matriarch." At the age of 44, she was murdered in a mass shooting, along with four other people.

== Artist ==
In the late 1990s, at the age of 19, Cardenas opened a tattoo shop, Twisted Sol, in the Capitol Hill neighborhood of Denver. She cleaned houses and delivered pizzas to achieve her dream of opening a tattoo shop.

As a muralist, she painted numerous works throughout the city of Denver. One of her notable works, completed in 2020, can be found in the Five Points neighborhood and is entitled "Crush Walls". She took part in the city's Babe Walls and RiNo Crush Walls events. She mentored many artists in the community. She curated three art shows for the Chicano Humanities & Arts Council in Denver.

Cardenas was a social activist and advocate for indigenous and LGBTQ+ rights. She was involved in the Mesoamerican dance and arts community.

As an artist, Cardenas embraced the worldview of Chicanismo and interconnectedness. She had adopted as her own mantra the Lakota prayer phrases "Ometeotl Tlazocomatli" and "Mitakuye Oyasin", meaning 'Gratitude to the spirit of the divine' and 'All my relatives (we are all related)'. She gave the following as her life's guiding principle: "Become in harmony with the Earth and your fellow humans. Stay humble and work hard. Push to be a role model and show up for your community."

== Death and legacy ==
In 2021, at the age of 44, Cardenas was murdered along with four other people in a mass shooting in Denver, perpetrated by Lyndon McLeod, the former owner of her shop. McLeod had self-published a trilogy of books where he mentioned murdering Cardenas, along with another of his eventual real-life victims. The Chicano Humanities and Arts Council, Museo de las Americas, Bobby LeFebre, and her family and friends mourned Cardenas' loss and paid tribute to her legacy. She was remembered for her bright personality, always taking chances, and being a wonderful mother.

She was honored by the arts and culture organisation, Return of the Corn Mothers, who inducted her as the 2022 Corn Mother. The Corn Mother honor is bestowed as part of a multi-generational and multi-cultural exhibit celebrating women in American culture and art.
