= Rita Flores de Wallace =

Denver-based Mexican folklorist and artist (1937–2025)

- Born: April 15, 1937; Galeana, Nuevo Leon, Mexico
- Died: April 27, 2025 (aged 88); Denver, Colorado
- Occupation: Folklorist
- Spouse: John Wallace

Rita Flores de Wallace (1937–2025) was Denver's 'First Lady of Mexican folk art,' and was credited with developing the Mexican art scene in Denver during her career.

== Biography ==
Rita Flores was born on April 15, 1937, in Galeana, Mexico to parents Eulogio Flores Aguirre and Rita Melendez de Flores. Eulogio was a hydrological engineer, whose work for the government took him and the family to rural areas of Mexico to establish potable water and new agricultural areas. During these travels across Mexico, Flores studied traditional folk arts of the indigenous people of Nuevo León. The family moved to Saltillo, Mexico when she was 8 years old.

She danced with the Escuela Nacional de Bellas Artes Academy in Mexico City with their Coahuilan dance troupe. In addition to dancing, Flores de Wallace was an artist who worked with papier mache, papel picado, folk dancing, and magic embroidery.

=== Expanded description ===
Flores de Wallace was the dance director of Teatro Latina de Colorado for over 15 years. She was the Artistic Directora for Centro Cultural de Mexico and the Mexican Counsel.

In 2022, Flores de Wallace was honored with the "Return of the Corn Mothers" exhibit and created an installation with Cal Duran for the exhibit at History Colorado.

=== Personal life ===
Flores married John Wallace in 1980. They met in 1978 when Wallace was visiting Mexico. She moved to Colorado when they married, first in Fort Collins and afterward in Denver.

=== Death and legacy ===
Flores de Wallace died on Sunday, April 27, 2025, in Denver, Colorado. Her protege Cal Duran created and installed a Dia de los Muertos exhibit honoring her at History Colorado in October 2025.

== Recognition ==
- 1999 Governors Heritage Award
- Univision's Pillar of the Community Award
- Mizel Museum of the Judaica's Excellent Teacher Award
- Lena Archuleta Community Service Award
- Chicano Humanities and Arts Council's Life Work Achievement Award
- SCFD’s Rex Morgan Award
- the XUPANTLA Cihuatoanii Leadership Award
- the Centro Juan Diego Madrina Award
- the Metro State Colorado Folk Arts Counsel Corn Mother Award
- Latinas Honoring Latinas Companera Award
- Carson, Brierly, Giffin Legends of Dance Honoree Award.
