= Jeanette Trujillo-Lucero =

Mexican and Spanish dancer in Denver, CO

- Born: 1950 (age 75–76); Denver, Colorado
- Education: University of Colorado Boulder; University of Colorado Denver; Red Rocks Community College
- Occupations: Dancer and dance company director

Jeanette Trujillo-Lucero (born 1950) is a dancer who has been recognized for her Spanish and folklore dances. She is the founder and artistic director of Fiesta Colorado Dance Company and Ballet Folklorico de Colorado. Her stage name is "La Muñeca" (The Doll) for her petite stature. Her dance background includes Mexican folklorico, classical Spanish dance, Flamenco, jazz, tap, and ballet.

== Biography ==
Jeanette Trujillo-Lucero was born in southwest Denver, Colorado to parents Jim and Martha Baca Trujillo. Her Spanish and Mexican roots influenced her styles of dance and her mission to promote Her mother instilled a love of dance in her as early as age four. She attended Lincoln High School, and was a cheerleader and involved in student government. She graduated in 1970.

Trujillo-Lucero attended the University of Colorado Boulder and the University of Colorado Denver, and received formal training from Lucille Campa, Augustine del Razo, and Raul Valdez. She worked as a cosmetologist and floral designer when she was not dancing. In the 1980s, she lived in Santa Fe, New Mexico where she trained in flamenco dance.

Trujillo-Lucero held the first Fiesta Colorado performance in 1972 at the Cosmopolitan Hotel. She formed the Fiesta Colorado Dance Company in 1997 with her father Jim Trujillo. Trujillo-Lucero owned and directed the Danzantes Dance Studio for 25 years. She has mentored and taught countless students, including five Colorado State Fair Fiesta Queens, including Crisanta Duran and Jose "Chepe" Rosales.

In 2020, she earned a certificate in non-profit management from Red Rocks Community College.

She has collaborated with the Colorado Symphony, National Repertory Orchestra, International Mariachi Festival, and the Fiestas de Santa Fe.

Trujillo-Lucero has done Artist-in-Residence Programs and summer workshops with Colorado Ballet, David Taylor Dance, Colorado Folklife Festival, Colorado Showcase, Colorado Council on the Arts, Community Resources and the DPS Educational Television program.

=== Personal life ===
Trujillo-Lucero was married to Andy Lucero, who died in 2022. They had four children.

== Recognition ==
Trujillo-Lucero is highly recognized for her contributions to Spanish and Mexican style dances and preserving the culture in Colorado.

- 1997, Mayor's Award for Excellence from the Mayor of Denver
- 2006, Mayor's Award for Excellence from the Mayor of Denver
- 2008, Legends of Dance from University of Denver Dance Archive
- 2017, Latina Trailblazer Award from Latina's First Foundation
- 2017, Luminaria Recognition Award from the Latino Leadership Institute
- 2019, Outstanding Teacher from Think 360 Arts
- 2021, John Madden Jr. Lifetime Achievement award from the Colorado Business Committee for the Arts
- 2022, Corn Mother from Return of the Corn Mothers exhibit at History Colorado
