= Rita Martinez =

American activist (1955–2020)

Rita Martinez (October 28, 1955 – December 10, 2020) was a Chicana activist operating in Pueblo, Colorado. She is notable for her activism against the observance of Columbus Day in Colorado. Her efforts came to fruition in 2020, when Colorado Governor Jared Polis signed a bill abolishing Columbus Day.

In 2019, Martinez was honored as a Corn Mother for her community support and movement building.

== Activism ==
Martinez began her life as an activist in the 1970s when she worked for the newspaper La Cucaracha where she was a reporter and photographer. One of the first issues she took up was police brutality and accountability. With her husband she helped organize Pueblo's Cinco de Mayo festivities for at least 45 years.

In 1992, the 500th anniversary of Columbus' arrival in the Americas, Martinez took part in protests against the Columbus Day parade, held in Denver, which has since been disbanded. Martinez, Esteban and Freddy "Freak" Trujillo founded the Colorado Chicano Movement archives at Colorado State University in Pueblo.

In 2020, her activism came to fruition when Colorado Governor Jared Polis signed a bill abolishing Columbus Day and creating Mother Cabrini Day instead. In the months prior to her death, from June to November 2020, she led weekly protests to remove a statue of Christopher Columbus form Mesa Junction in Pueblo, Colorado.

== Personal life ==
She met her husband Jose Esteban Ortega, at La Cucaracha, the newspaper she worked for in the late 70s. Together Martinez and Esteban had three children, daughter Neva, and sons Tomas and Vicente.

Martinez died from COVID-19 on December 10, 2020, at the age of 65, after 13 days in Parkview Medical Center.
