= Deborah Mora Espinosa =

Chicana activist in Pueblo, Colorado, U.S.

- Born: 1951 (age 74–75); Colorado, U.S.
- Occupations: Activist and museum director
- Spouse: Juan Espinosa

Deborah Mora Espinosa (born 1951) is a Chicana activist in Colorado. She worked for History Colorado as the director of El Pueblo History Museum.

== Biography ==
=== Early life ===
Deborah Mora Espinosa was born in Grand Junction, Colorado in 1951 to parents Gilbert Mora-Durán and Calletana Mora-Adargo. She grew up in western Colorado where her father worked on the D&RGW Railroad in Colorado. He died when Espinosa was 12 years old. Her parents had limited education and highly valued it in their children. The Mora family had three boys and four girls, and all received their high-school diplomas.

Espinosa faced discrimination based on class and her Chicano heritage. Her parents were stigmatized for speaking Spanish. She attended a parochial elementary school where she was one of two Mexican children.

=== Education ===
Espionsa started her college career at Mesa College in 1969 but dropped out after feeling like she didn't belong.

In 1970, she met Juan Espinosa who was returning from fighting in Vietnam. They married in 1971 and moved to Boulder, where they both attended the University of Colorado Boulder.

She received an M.A. in Non-Profit Management at Regis University, where she was a Colorado Trust Fellow.

== Activism ==
Espinosa started a Chicano student newspaper called El Diario, and was a co-chair of the United Mexican American Students (UMAS) group. She and Juan became heavily involved in El Movimiento in Colorado. Because of their student newspaper, they joined many of the major events as journalists such as Cesar Chavez and the United Farm Workers, the La Raza Unida Party in Texas, and the Crusade for Justice with Corky Gonzalez in Denver.

Espinosa and other activists challenged CU's curriculum which excluded Chicano subjects, and protested discrimination. During her time as a student, she focused on supporting women who could not attend UMAS meetings because they were mothers or working women. Espinosa was friends with Los Seis de Boulder.

They went to Mexico to study for six months after Juan graduated from CU Boulder. When they returned to the US, they settled in Pueblo, Colorado. They have four daughters. Espinosa returned to college at the University of Southern Colorado. She received a B.S. degree in history and Chicano studies in 1975.

The Espinosas, David Martinez, and Pablo Mora started the Pueblo-based newspaper, La Cucaracha. It focused on issues that were important to Chicanos. The paper informed the community and documented El Movimiento. The paper ran from about 1968-1974 and operated out of the Espinosa's house.

In 1988, she became the director of El Pueblo Museum for the Colorado Historical Society. Under her guidance, the museum moved from an old airplane hangar to a historic location in downtown Pueblo. She was involved in city planning and the renovation of downtown Pueblo.

In 2015, she co-curated the exhibit at History Colorado Center in Denver, "El Moviemento: The Chicano Movement in Colorado."

== Published works ==
- Mora-Espinosa, Deborah. "Teresita Sandoval: Woman in Between." La Gente : Hispano History and Life in Colorado. Ed. C. de Baca, Vincent. Denver, Colo: Colorado Historical Society, 1998. Print.
