= Wulf Zendik =

American novelist

Wulf Zendik (born Lawrence E. Wulfing, in El Paso, Texas, October 7, 1920 – June 12, 1999) was an American author, poet, musician, environmentalist, and bohemian who founded Zendik Farm along with his wife.

He was the author of the novel A Quest Among The Bewildered, Blackhawk: Diary of an Eco-Warrior, and Zendik. and described himself as an "undiscovered Beat." Wulfing founded the community Zendik (also known as Zendik Arts Farm), located in Florida, Southern California, Texas, North Carolina, and West Virginia at various times, with his wife/partner Carol Merson (also known as Arol Wulf).

After Zendik's death, Zendik Farm continued Zendik's philosophy by promoting the arts and an environmentally sound lifestyle. In 2006, the community had a show, Zendik News, on public-access television Channel 75 in Baltimore, MD. Zendik Farm members were known for their sales of T-shirts and bumper stickers saying "Stop Bitching, Start a Revolution." The community has since disbanded, with the property being sold. It has been accused by former members and apostates of being a 'sex cult', wherein Wulf Zendik was presumed to have sexual access to females on the group, and was also the final say on who was allowed to date or have sex with each other.

== Publications and music ==
- Zendik, Wulf. 2001. A quest among the bewildered. Mill Spring, N.C.: Zendik Communal Arts.
- Zendik, Wulf. 1990. Blackhawk: diary of an eco-warrior. Bastrop, TX: Zendik Farm.
- Zendik, Wulf. 1990. Bop! Bastrop, Tex: Zendik Farm Arts Foundation.
- Zendik, Wulf. 2005. I=eM-e: the cozmik equation. [Marlinton, W.Va.]: Zendik Arts.
- Zendik, Wulf. 2003. Talk given to the International Monetary Fund one night before takeover. Mill Spring, NC: W. Zendik.
- Zendik, 1998 rock music CD, Vero Beach, FL: Zendik Soundz. Songs: Strontium rain—Purple blaze—Yang/yin—When she strays—Ancient in my eyes—Jewels and things—This muzik.
- We the poet. Rock music CD by Zendik (Organization). 1999. Mill Springs, NC: Zendik Soundz. Songs: What happened to rock'n roll—My life would sing—How many—Last chance blues—Girl could dance—Never had a chance—River in my mind—Gambler—Let it rip.
- Zendik Orgaztra, and Wulf Zendik. 1999. Dance of the cozmic warriorz. Vero Beach, FL: Zendik Soundz. Songs: Yang/yin—Farm jam—The kiss—Madman—Dance of the cozmic warriorz—Let's get stoned—Inzanity.

== See also ==
- Art Commune
