= Maria Josefa Jaramillo Carson =

Wife of Kit Carson

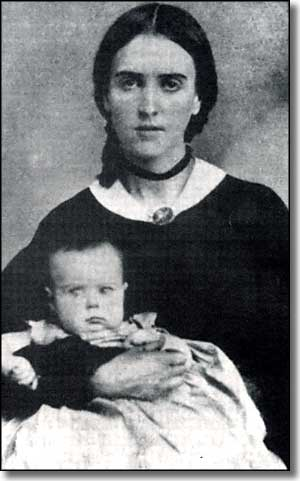
- Born: March 19, 1828; Santa Fe, New Mexico
- Died: April 27, 1868 (aged 40); Boggsville, Colorado
- Spouse: Christopher "Kit" Carson

Maria Josefa Jaramillo Carson (March 19, 1828 – April 27, 1868) was the third wife of frontiersman Kit Carson.

== Early life ==
Maria Josefa Jaramillo was born on March 19, 1828, at Santa Cruz de la Cañada, in the Rio Grande Valley near Taos. Her father was Francisco Jaramillo, a respected merchant, and her mother was Maria Apolonia Vigil. Both the Jaramillo and Vigil families were prominent in the Taos area. They owned land in the Rio Grande Valley, and moved to Taos when she was an infant. Her ancestors had migrated from Mexico City and Zacatecas to New Mexico during the Spanish reconquest in the 1690s.

== Adult life ==
Jaramillo met Carson in 1842 when she was 14 years old. They were introduced by Governor Charles Bent, who married Jaramillo's sister, Maria Ignacia. Jaramillo's father had reservations about Carson, who was illiterate and not a Catholic. Carson converted to Catholicism and was baptized on January 28, 1843.

Jaramillo married Kit Carson on February 6, 1843, in Our Lady of Guadalupe Church. Governor Bent and Maria Ignacia hosted their wedding celebrations. Jaramillo was known for her hospitality and care of neighbors.

Carson called Jaramillo "Chipeta/Little Singing Bird" as a nickname. Carson left shortly after their wedding to continue US territorial expansion. Jaramillo spent 13 months alone without her husband. She maintained their cabin on the Little Cimmaron River alone. They only spent a brief period together, from 1854 to 1861, when Carson worked as an Indian agent in Taos.

In 1847, while Carson was away, the Taos people revolted against the military and civil government. Rebels broke into the home where the family was staying and assassinated Bent and Jaramillo's brother. Ignacia, Jaramillo, and the family escaped and stayed hidden until the rebellion was quelled. The adults were later eyewitnesses in the trials that followed. Carson and Jaramillo became the guardians of her brother's children. The family left Taos and moved to Rayado.

The couple had six biological children together: Charles Bent Carson (1849-1851), William Carson (b.1852), Teresina (b. 1854) Cristoval Charles (b. 1858), Rebecca (b. 1864), and Estefana Stella (b. 1868). Additionally, they "adopted" three Native American orphans.

When the Civil War broke out, Carson joined the Union army. When he learned that Confederate soldiers were advancing on Taos, he notified Jaramillo, who fled with the family. She hid any money and valuables they had on one of the adopted Native American children. They met a group of Ute peoples who had a Diné boy in tow. The travelers said the boy was troublesome and they would kill him. Jaramillo traded one of their horses for the child, and they adopted him. According to scholar Johnson, "Tales like these were consistent with the apologetics of captivity in New Mexico, where claims of rescue and kinship obscured the coercion of slavery".

In 1865, Carson became Superintendent of Indian Affairs for Colorado Territory, and the family moved to Boggsville, Colorado.

== Death and legacy ==
Maria Josefa Jaramillo Carson died on April 27, 1868, at age 40, due to complications from childbirth. Carson died shortly after, and the couple were buried together. They now rest in the Kit Carson Park cemetery in Taos.

Her descendants still speak of her with reverence for her perseverance despite her husband's absences and her strong familial connections and support.

One of her descendants is historian librarian Charlene Garcia Simms.
