= Lucy Lucero =

Latina community leader in Denver, Colorado (1919-2010)

- Born: October 19, 1919; Somerset, Colorado
- Died: February 14, 2010 (aged 90); Denver, Colorado
- Occupation: Community leader

Lucy Lucero (October 10, 1919 - February 14, 2010) was a Latina community leader in Denver, Colorado. Her home on Galapago St. was known as a haven for the Hispanic and Latino community, especially for young gay Latinos who were ostracized from their own families. She was the great-aunt of author Kali Fajardo-Anstine.

== Biography ==
Lucy Lopez Dussart Lucero was born on October 10, 1919 in Somerset, Colorado. She was the youngest of eight children. Her father was an immigrant from Belgium, and her mother had Mexican, Spanish, and Native American heritage. Her father was a coal miner, and the mining community was described as one big family.

Her home at 547 Galapago St. was a center for the Latino community. She cooked meals for hungry people in the community, and the home was a haven for gay Latinos. She housed many young people who had AIDS and were ostracized from the community.

She had several businesses, including a restaurant and a tree trimming business.

=== Personal life ===
Lucero was married to her husband Avel. The couple had three sons, and many extended family members.

Lucero was the great-aunt of author Kali Fajardo-Anstine.

=== Death and legacy ===
Lucy Lucero died on February 14, 2010.

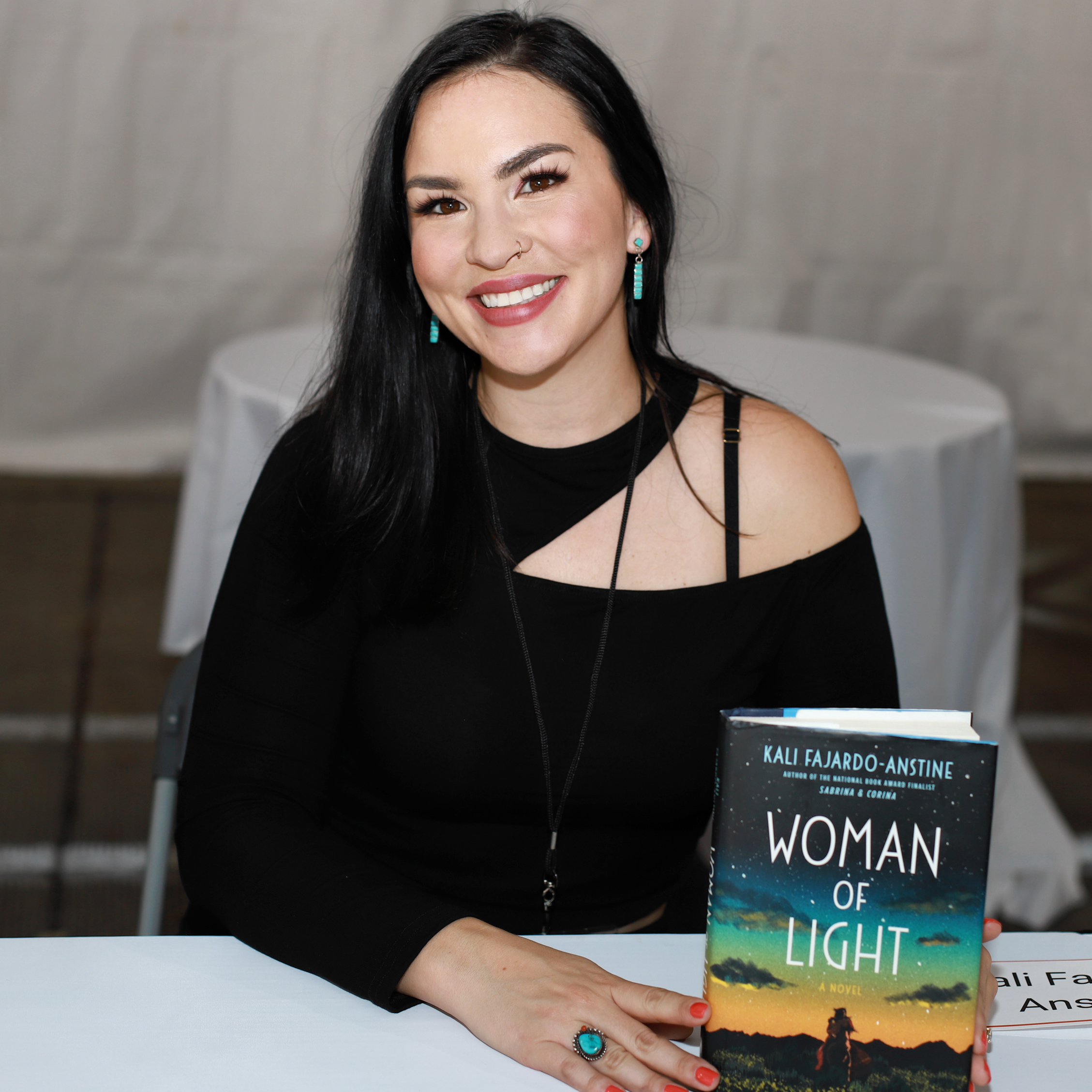
Kali Fajardo Anstine 2022 Texas Book Festival

Lucero's grand-niece Kali Fajardo-Anstine has credited her as an inspiration for the main character, Luz Lopez, in her novels. Fajardo-Anstine said that the idea for her first novel Woman of Light came to her while sitting in Lucero's home. The family had a strong oral history, and Lucero told the family tales with gripping cinematic intensity. There are many similarities between Luz and Lucero.

Fajardo-Anstine recognized that the City of Denver's report on Mexican American/Chicano/Latino history in Denver had listed Lucero's home as an important site, but there was no attribution to Lucero's daughter or other family members who shared stories about the home. The report also misspelled Lucero's name.

== Recognition ==
In 2008, Lucero was honored by the History Colorado Corn Mothers exhibit for her impact on the Denver community. Dr. Renee Fajardo, the creator of the project, was inspired to preserve the legacies of important women in order to honor her late aunt Lucero.
