= Zendik Farm =

California community of artists and environmentalists

- Zendik Farm Arts Cooperative
- Formation: 1969
- Founder: Wulf Zendik and Arol Zendik
- Dissolved: 2013
- Type: Intentional community / artists' cooperative
- Purpose: Environmentalism, communal/artistic living ("Ecolibrium" and "Creavolution" philosophy)
- Headquarters: Marlinton, West Virginia (final location)
- Location(s): Multiple, incl. Perris, California; Bonsall, California; Topanga and Boulevard, California; Bastrop and Austin, Texas; Asheville, North Carolina; Marlinton, West Virginia
- Members: ~60 at peak
- Publication: The Cozmik Revolutionist

Zendik Farm, officially known as Zendik Farm Arts Cooperative, was an American intentional community of artists and assorted craftspeople that went through several iterations and locations between 1969 and 2013. They presented themselves as a living laboratory for a way of living based on a feeling of reverence for the Earth; and supported themselves through the sale of literature and merchandise promoting their beliefs and displaying their artistic statements. The community has sometimes been described as a cult.

The Zendiks spent years in Texas during the eighties and were frequently seen on their television program on the local Austin Access station.

== History ==
=== Origin ===
It was founded by Wulf Zendik (1920-1999) (previously known as Lawrence E. Wulfing), poet, novelist, philosopher, and musician. He was born in El Paso, Texas, and grew up in pre-WW II Los Angeles. During the 1950's and 60's, he composed two novels (A Quest Among The Bewildered, and Zendik) while in Paris, Spain, and Los Angeles, California.

While living in a bohemian boarding house in Los Angeles during the early 60's, Wulfing met Carol Merson Weinberg (1938-2012). She was an aspiring actress born in Brooklyn, NY. She dropped the 'C' from her first name and became Arol Wulfing (later Arol Wulf), while Wulfing took the name Wulf Zendik. Zendik is a Sanskrit language word for outlaw or heretic.

The two were convinced that humanity was heading in the wrong direction which prompted them to move in together at a small ranch near Perris, California owned by Wulf's parents; and created Zendik Farm there in 1969.

=== Perris, California (c.1969 - c.1974) ===
The commune first housed roughly 5 people in huts that were made up of plywood and carpeting that had been taken from dumpsters. At its peak there were as many as 60 people there, living in school buses and trailers.

At the Perris location Wulf turned his attention to music, developing an improvised form of vocal and instrumental art. Among a host of other instruments, he invented and built the Itar, an 8-string instrument combining the sounds of both the Eastern sitar and the Western guitar. A band was formed that performed mostly at universities in the Southern California region.

He also continued writing, creating volumes of poetry, and “Don’t Go,” a slim, powerful anti-war hymn. These were the farm's first efforts at self-publishing with the deployment of a mimeograph printer.

Smog and development eventually encroached on the property and the Perris commune disbanded by the mid-1970's.

=== Florida (c.1975 - 1978) ===
After a brief period living on a shrimp boat in Key West, Wulf and Arol settled into a compound at 3317 Virginia St., in the Coconut Grove neighborhood of Miami, Florida. From "The Grove," they recruited new members to rebuild the commune, and incorporated as a non-profit as The Zendik Society - Church Of Life Essence, Inc. Wulf wrote a play (best described as a series of sketches) called The Oracle, and they supported themselves by staging the play nightly for donations.

The birth of their daughter Fawn in 1976 brought a turn toward militant environmentalism in Wulf's writing. The outlook for Fawn's future came to symbolize the future for all children, which they saw as dystopian and destructive from both an ecological and social perspective. This inspired the publication of a collection of essays titled "The Reality Is This...", which was a call to Revolution as the only way to salvage a livable environment.

Attracted to the "Back to the Land" movement of the late 1970's, the commune moved to a plot of land near Ocala, Florida in 1977 with then intention of building a self-sufficient "off-grid" community. The members who romanticized moving back to the land were unprepared for the hardships of such a life, so most of them left.

Wulf, Arol, Fawn and the remaining members retreated to a compound in Gainesville, Florida over the winter of 1977-78 and prepared for a move back to California, which happened in May, 1978.

=== Bonsall, CA (1978-1981) ===
The Zendiks arrived in California with five people. They began rebuilding the commune over the following summer, first at a rented compound south of Temecula, and later at a rented suburban house near Fallbrook. By the fall of 1978, about a dozen members settled into a 5-acre homestead owned by Wulf's parents in Bonsall, a small farming community in northern San Diego County.

Members at the Bonsall farm had their own (often improvised) living spaces in buses, trailers and sections of outbuildings. A large garden was established and they started accumulating livestock, including dairy goats, fowl, and donkeys acquired through a government adoption program.

In the spring of 1979 they published the first issue of "The Cozmik Revolutionist", a mimeographed newspaper promoting their militant environmentalist point of view. The motivation was to give members something to do when venturing into the outside world, but it soon developed into a significant source of income. By the end of the Bonsall era, groups of Zendiks were regularly spending weekends selling "mags" on the streets of the San Diego and Los Angeles regions.

Meanwhile, the hills surrounding the farm were frequently the target of aerial application of commercial pesticides. Living downwind from these clouds of poison made any long-term future for the Bonsall site untenable. In the summer of 1980, they began to prepare the Bonsall site for sale, gathered buses and trailers with the intent to eventually become a nomadic group, and shed much of their membership.

The remaining members rented a house on the desert near Thousand Palms over the following winter; and they were down to six people before they began to regroup in the Fall of 1981.

=== Topanga, CA (1982-1985) ===
The winter of 1981-1982 was spent at a site near Salton City that the group purchased the previous Spring. The bus caravan moved to a rented house near Venice beach until they found and purchased their more permanent home in Topanga.

The Topanga house began as a pair of run-down buildings clinging to a hillside that any other buyer would have torn down to start over. Some members refurbished the houses while others built a series of rock walls and terraces on the slope. Individual living spaces were improvised from crawl spaces, tree houses and utility sheds.

Living in the Los Angeles region gave them access to influential figures in the environmental movement and the entertainment industry, which led to a series of "mags" called the Ecolibrium Interviews. Zendiks selling mags became a regular fixture outside health food stores, bookstores, and supermarkets in the area.

Due to air quality issues, Wulf could not live at Topanga so part of the group stayed behind to prepare the site for sale. Meanwhile the rest of the group spent time in rented spaces near Ensenada, Mexico and Imperial Beach. When the sale of the Topanga site was completed late in 1985, the group reconsolidated at a farmstead near Thousand Palms.

=== Boulevard, CA (1986-1991) ===
Funds from the sale of the Topanga compound were applied to a 75-acre farm on Tierra del Sol Road, near the Mexican border south of Boulevard, CA. Late in the winter of 1986 the Zendik community moved onto the farm with about 20 people.

The main house was quickly expanded and rehabilitated. Living spaces were in buses, trailers and improvised huts built with reclaimed materials; and most spaces were shared by two to four members.

An ambitious vegetable garden was established, along with a small but growing herd of dairy goats and an assortment of chickens, ducks and geese.

The publishing operation generated the bulk of their income, and part of the group worked full-time producing a new "mag" every few months. The novel "Blackhawk" (later released as "Bop!") was also published during this period. The Zendik Farm Orgaztra began releasing cassette tapes of Wulf's poetry set to music; and they started producing and selling t-shirts with their silk-screened designs. Teams of street sellers would spend weekends hawking these products in the San Diego, Los Angeles, or San Francisco Bay areas; and distribution went nationwide beginning in 1987.

By the end of the 1980's the community's population grew to 40. The farming operation tried to expand into field crops, but the available water proved to be inadequate so they began exploring for a region with a hospitable climate and adequate water. The search focused on central Texas, and a foothold was established in Austin when Wulf and a skeleton crew rented a house there over the winter of 1990-91.

They immediately started producing programs at Austin's public access TV studio and releasing them on public access channels in Austin and elsewhere. Late in the winter they located and purchased 300-acre farm near Bastrop; and the remainder of group moved from Boulevard to Bastrop in the spring of 1991.

There was a brief stint in Central Florida. Transitioning from an orange grove, the commune settled near Asheville, North Carolina. Despite the move being in part to help Wulf's weak lungs, Wulf died in June 1999 at the age of 79. Zendik Farm's last relocation was to Marlinton, West Virginia with roughly 60 members. By 2013 the commune had ultimately disbanded, possibly as a consequence of Arol Zendik's death in 2012, at age 72.

Their mission was to save the earth from Ecollapse (a term that Zendik coined to describe the collapse of Earth's ecology) and was founded in hopes of inspiring humanity to cooperate and stop destroying the planet. To minimize their environmental impact and further reject the outside culture and consumerism, they would sew their own clothes, use composting toilets, build housing using recycled materials, etc. They practiced self-reliance by growing their own organic food and raising poultry and goats. They loved animals and had many dogs, horses, peacocks. guinea hens, cats and a parrot named Zugar. The importance of ethical environmental conservation became a reason for frugality. Zendik Farm had a library consisting of second-hand books which covered subjects such as practical first aid, herbalism and esoteric philosophy.

Zendik Farm was not religiously affiliated, however they had a belief system and presented themselves as spiritual. Although they did not believe in a divine nature, Zendiks venerated Wulf & his philopsy of Ecolibrium & Creavolution. They studied his teachings and his philosophy was the central focus of Zendik Farm.

They claimed to value autonomy yet also a sense of collective responsibility. Every resident had a space that was designated to them that allowed them to express their creativity. However, the majority of things that include money, tasks, food, and the last name Zendik, were shared. Additionally, when someone gave birth to the child the community would take the responsibility of raising them, oftentimes making it hard to decipher who is the actual mother of the child. Wulf Zendik believed sex in society came with possessive attitudes that had the potential to lead to jealousy and violence. His solution was to create an “erosocial” committee where members would have to announce another member they wanted to have sex with, then get it approved by the committee that would ask the other member if they were interested. Arol believed this would remove the possessiveness that came along with sex and would save members embarrassment in case of rejection.

For money, Zendik Farm would publish magazines they would later sell to people outside of the farm. This 32 to 64 page newspaper would be produced a few times a year and sold on the weekends in nearby cities. They would also sell other Zendik propaganda that took form in poetry, artwork, bumper stickers, CDs, essays, and cartoons that expressed their message “Stop Bitching, Start a Revolution”. On these trips to sell their newspeak, they would also try to recruit members for their commune. They looked for people who felt they did not belong in society and were interested in a new culture that Zendik Farm was trying to create. There was also a common belief that it was okay to lie and steal from those outside of Zendik Farm. The outside world was known as the “Deathculture” and everybody who was a part of it was known as a “square”.
