= Kali Fajardo-Anstine =

American writer (born 1986)

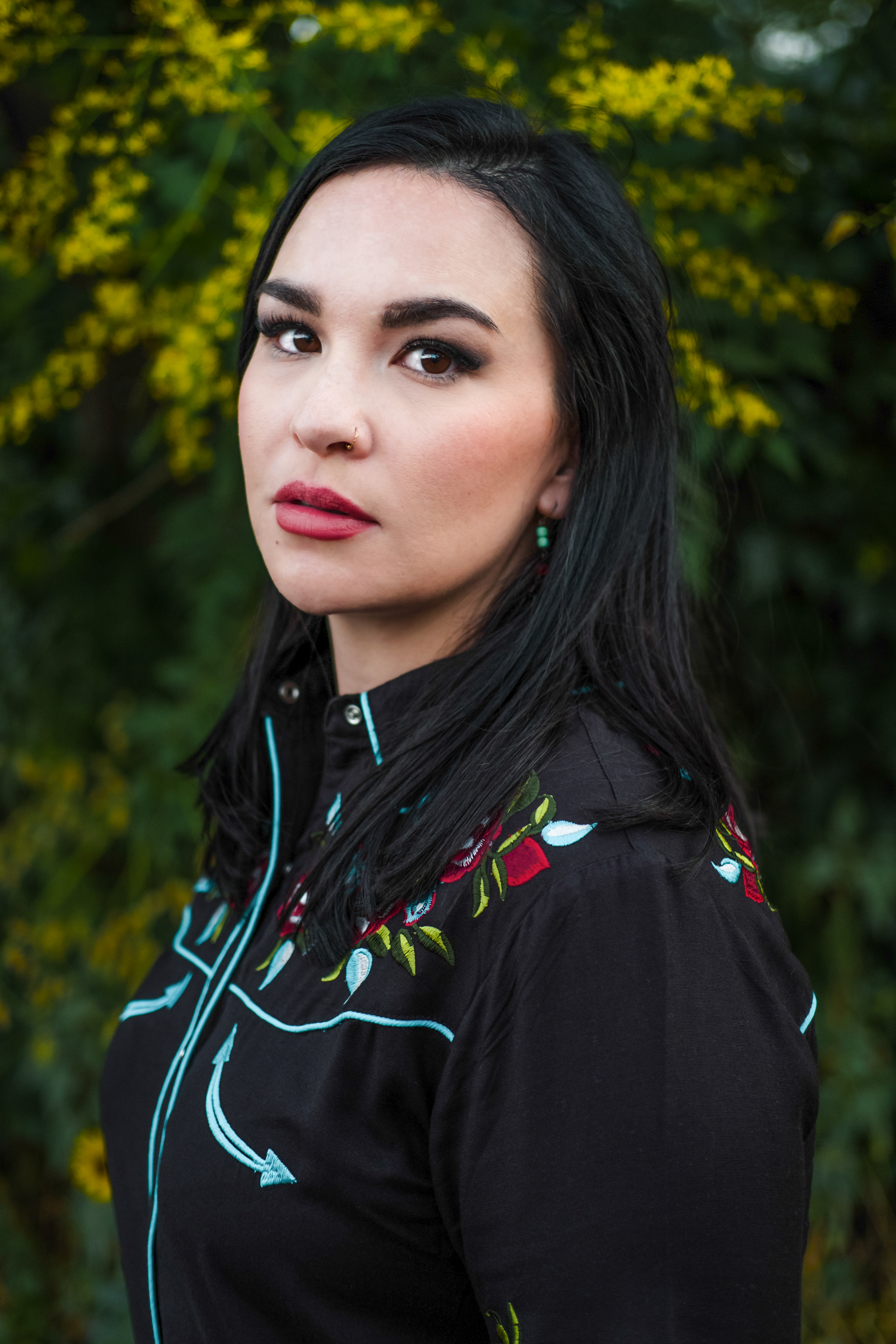
- Kali Fajardo-Anstine
- Born: November 9, 1986 (age 40); Denver, Colorado, U.S.
- Education: Metropolitan State University of Denver (BA); University of Wyoming (MFA)
- Occupation: Writer
- Writing career
- Notable works: "Sabrina and Corina: Stories"; Woman of Light
- Notable awards: American Book Award Guggenheim Fellowship

Kali Fajardo-Anstine (born November 9, 1986) is an American novelist and short story writer from Denver, Colorado. She won the 2020 American Book Award for Sabrina & Corina: Stories and was a 2019 finalist for the National Book Award for Fiction. Her first novel, Woman of Light: A Novel (2022), is a national bestseller and won the 2023 WILLA Literary Award in Historical Fiction. She is the 2022–2024 Endowed Chair in Creative Writing at Texas State University and a 2023 Guggenheim Fellow.

== Early life ==
Kali Fajardo-Anstine was born in Denver, Colorado in 1986. She is the second eldest of seven siblings, six sisters and one brother.

She struggled with depression growing up because she didn’t feel she fit in culturally or socially with her peers, and turned to books and writing for comfort.

After being pushed to leave high school by an unsupportive English teacher, Fajardo-Anstine dropped out and earned her GED. She worked as a bookseller in Denver while studying English and Chicano/a studies at Metropolitan State University of Denver, where she first began to write early drafts of short stories.

In 2013, she earned a Master of Fine Arts in Fiction from University of Wyoming, where she studied under writers Brad Watson and Joy Williams. Her graduate thesis created the foundation for her award-winning debut collection, Sabrina & Corina.

== Career ==
Fajardo-Anstine's work often features mixed-race, Latina and Native American women in Colorado and the American West.

In 2019, her debut collection of short stories, Sabrina & Corina, was published by Random House. The book, set in Denver, focuses on Chicanas of mixed ancestry. The stories deal with themes of abandonment, heritage, home, and the lives of women and girls. Much of Fajardo-Anstine's work focuses on the experiences of women. In Poets & Writers in 2022, Fajardo-Anstine recalled strangers dismay at the size of her family. "My parents had six daughters and only one son. I remember people saying they felt sorry for my parents for having so many girls. There was an awful subtext there, that our lives as daughters weren’t as valuable as sons.”

In 2022, after over a decade of research on her family history in Colorado, Fajardo-Anstine published her debut novel, Woman of Light. The Guardian described the novel as, "a feat of old school storytelling." She credited her great-aunt Lucy Lucero as an inspiration for the main character Luz Lopez. The idea for the novel came to her while sitting in her great-aunt's home and listening to her stories, which have been excluded from traditional histories.

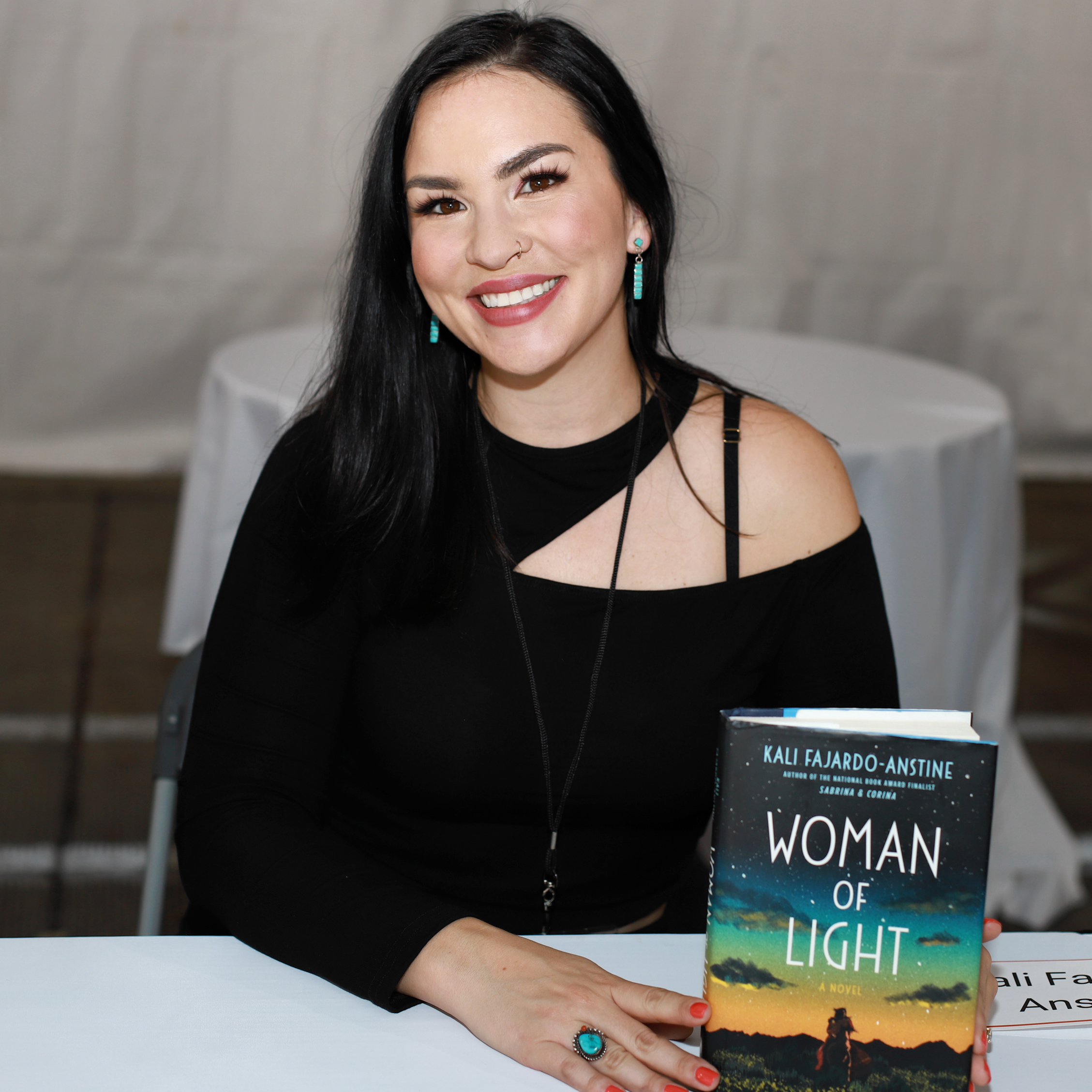
Fajardo-Anstine at the 2022 Texas Book Festival.

Fajardo-Anstine is a mixed-race Chicana woman with Indigenous, Jewish, and Filipino ancestry. On Latino USA in 2022, she said of her work, "I could never pick up a book, turn on the TV, listen to the radio, and find people like us allowed to talk about the nuance of their identity... Everything was always sort of neatly put into categories and those categories did not represent who we were.”

Fajardo-Anstine is inspired by the absence of Chicano or Latinx culture in the histories or narratives of the American West. In the Denver Public Library Western Genealogy Archives and most other traditional archives, White history is overrepresented. She found relics like an infant-size Ku Klux Klan robe with initials stitched in, yet she could not find information about indigenous and native Americans of Mexican descent. She saw that City of Denver's report on Mexican American/Chicano/Latino history in Denver had listed her great-aunt Lucero's home as an important site, but there was no attribution to Lucero's daughter or other family members who shared stories about the home. The report also misspelled Lucero's name, and her family asked that information be removed.

In 2023, Fajardo-Anstine wrote a new introduction to Willa Cather's classic novel Death Comes for the Archbishop that was published by Penguin Classics.

Her work is often taught in high school and college classes throughout the United States.

== Selected works ==
=== Books ===
- Sabrina & Corina: Stories (2019)
- Woman of Light: A Novel (2022)

=== Short Stories ===
- "Remedies" in Electric Literature
- "All Her Names" in The American Scholar
- "The Yellow Ranch" in O, The Oprah Magazine
- "Star" in Freeman's: Animals

=== Essays ===
- "But You Can’t Stay Here" in Harper's Bazaar
- "On Roots and Research" in Gay
- "The “Old Universal Truths” of Arturo Islas" in Library of America

Criticism

- "In Praise of Willa Cather and the American Southwest" in Literary Hub

Book Reviews

- "A Visceral and Fabulist Short Story Collection..." in The New York Times Book Review
- "What I Learned at West Side Books--And What Comes Next" in Denverite, January 28, 2026.

== Awards and honors ==
=== Honors ===
- 2021, Addison M. Metcalf from the American Academy of Arts and Letters

=== Literary awards ===
Year	Title	Award	Category	Result	Ref
2019	Sabrina & Corina	National Book Award	Fiction	Shortlisted	
2020	Sabrina & Corina	American Book Award	—	Won	
2020	Sabrina & Corina	The Story Prize	—	Shortlisted	
2023	Woman of Light	Carol Shields Prize for Fiction	—	Longlisted	
2023	Woman of Light	Joyce Carol Oates Literary Prize	—	Longlisted	
2023	Woman of Light	Reading the West	—	Won	
2023	Woman of Light	WILLA Literary Award	Historical Fiction	Won	
