= Ray Aguilera =

American politician

Ray Aguilera (October 27, 1942 – May 9, 2021) was a Pueblo, Colorado, City council member and prominent business man within that community. He was a member of the Democratic party He had been a member from May 23, 2003, and his current term was to expire December 31, 2023. He is the recipient of several local and regional awards. In 2000, he was appointed by then-Governor Bill Owens for a term with the Caring for Colorado Foundation, expiring May 2003. Ray Aguilera was a commissioner representing Colorado for the Education Commission of the States. He served as president and founder of the Pueblo Hispanic Education Foundation, and as a board member of the Latino Chamber of Commerce. He was out-spoken in his support of gays. He frequently also wrote editorials for the Denver Post.

== Awards ==
Ray Aguilera has been the recipient of several awards in recognition his work. He received the Pueblo African-American Concern Organization (PAACO) award in 1998, in recognition of help and support to the Black community, received the El Pomar Foundation Thayer Tutt Award in 1996, and received the Latin-American Education Foundation Annual Salute Award in 1995.

In addition to these awards, he was also named the Greater Pueblo Chamber of Commerce Member of the Year in 1996, was named the Fiesta Day Parade Marshal in 1997, was named Latino Chamber Member of the Year in 1988, and became the United States Hispanic Chamber Government Advocate in 2007.

== Controversies ==
Aguilera stirred some controversy in early 2011, when he joined conservative lawmakers across the country in giving support to an anti-union proposal in Pueblo. The measure would have weakened protections and bargaining rights for city workers. The attempt failed because it would have meant changing the city's charter.

Aguilera commonly referred to himself as the "Mayor of Bessemer." He was an opponent of two 2009 City ballot measures that would have created a strong- or weak-mayor/council form of city government.
