= Charlene Garcia Simms =

American Chicana teacher-librarian (born 1952)

Charlene Garcia Simms (born 1952) is a teacher-librarian from Garcia, Colorado. She and her husband founded El Escritorio Publishing which focuses on the history and genealogy of the Southwestern United States.

== Biography ==
Charlene Garcia Simms grew up in Garcia, Colorado. She is a relation of Maria Josefa Jaramillo Carson, the third wife of Kit Carson.

She was married to Eduard Simms.

=== Expanded description ===
She received an MBA from Colorado State University Pueblo, and earned her Master's of Library Science from the University of Arizona. While at Arizona, she was a Knowledge River Scholar.

Garcia Simms and her husband are the co-owners of El Escritorio Publishing. The company has published 15 books with a focus on Southwest history and genealogy. They published Colorado State Fair Fiesta Day magazines for over 20 years, and her private collection has been used to research Pueblo's music history. She also has a collection at CSU Pueblo on Olibama Lopez Tushar.

In addition to publishing poetry and books, she has coordinated public art shows focusing on Hispanic artists with masterpieces but no place to showcase them. She published Spanish/Mexican Legacy of Latinos in Pueblo County and an inspired mural called "Corazon de Pueblo."

Garcia Simms worked at the Bruce Randolph School in Denver for 3 years, then in June 2008 returned to Pueblo to be the Hispanic resources librarian at Robert H. Rawlings Public Library. She is currently the Genealogy and Special Collections Librarian at the Pueblo City-County Library System, and was previously the President of the Genealogy Society of Hispanic America.

Garcia Simms has been part of the Fray Angelico Chavez chapter of the Genealogical Society of Hispanic America. She was the Chairperson of the 2015 National Conference Team for the organization, and she edited their official newsletter.

In 2021, Garcia Simms received a research grant from the Aztlán Center at CSU Pueblo to explore the historical lives of Chicana women in New Mexico and Colorado.

== Recognition ==
In 2019, Simms was inducted as a Corn Mother for her social justice work and community support.

== Published works ==
=== Books ===
- Genealogy and the Librarian, Perspectives on Research, Instruction, Outreach, and Management
- Simms, Charlene G, Maria S. Tucker, Jeffrey DeHerrera, and Pueblo C.-C. L. District. Pueblo. Chicago: Arcadia Publishing Inc, 2017. Internet resource.
- Sandoval, David A, and Charlene G. Simms. Spanish / Mexican Legacy of Latinos in Pueblo County. Pueblo City-County Library District, 2012. Internet resource.
- Simms, Charlene G. Orphan Stalk: Growing Up Adopted in a Manito Culture. 2021. Print.
- Márquez, Joseph A, and Charlene G. Simms. East and west of the Sangre de Cristos. Pueblo, CO: El Escritorio, 1991. Print.
- Márquez, Joseph A, and Charlene G. Simms. La Familia De Córdoba. Pueblo, CO: El Escritorio, 1991. Print.
- Simms, Charlene G, Maria S. Tucker, and Jeffrey DeHerrera. Images of America: Pueblo, 2017. Print.

=== Poetry ===
- Airando el Frijol
- Mana Timotea
- Eres Chicana Tummy Tales - Chicos Deliciosos del Horno
