= La Cucaracha (newspaper) =

Chicano newspaper from Pueblo, Colorado (1976-1983)

- "A Chicano community newspaper."
- Founder(s): Juan and Deborah Espinosa, David Martinez, and Pablo Mora
- Publisher: Producciones Estrella Roja
- Founded: May 3, 1976; 50 years ago
- Ceased publication: November 1, 1983
- Language: English and Spanish
- Headquarters: Pueblo, Colorado
- City: Pueblo, Colorado
- ISSN: 0738-792X
- OCLC number: 5351669
- Free online archives: Colorado Historic Newspapers Collection

La Cucaracha (1976-1983) was an English and Spanish bilingual newspaper created by and for the Chicano community of Pueblo, Colorado. Creators Juan Espinosa, Deborah Espinosa, David Martinez and Pablo Mora recognized the exclusion of Chicanos in popular media and published the first issue in 1976.

== History ==
While Juan and Deborah Espinosa attended the University of Colorado Boulder, they were active in El Movimiento and student civil rights groups such as United Mexican American Students (UMAS). They started a student newspaper, El Diario de la Gente, to build cultural awareness of their community. They saw themselves being misrepresented by white mass media outlets and desired an outlet to tell their own stories.

After graduating, the couple moved to Pueblo, Colorado, which had large population of Chicanos.

In November 1975, the creators met with the Pueblo community at El Centro Quinto Sol to gather support for a Chicano newspaper, and recruit staff and supporters.

The Espinosas, David Martinez, and Pablo Mora began publishing La Cucaracha in 1976. The first issue was published on May 3, 1976 to celebrate Cinco de Mayo.

The newspaper was published under the umbrella organization Producciones Estrella Roja. This was a nonprofit media center located in Pueblo, which also published materials for the Latino Chamber of Commerce.

La Cucaracha was part of the Chicano Press Association.

Their offices were visited by many recognized figures in the Chicano movement and other civil rights groups. John Trudell and Carter Camp from the American Indian Movement, Daniel Valdez from El Teatro Campesino, Puerto Rican Independence advocate Juan Corretjer, and many others.

== Mission and purpose ==
In the first issue, the editors framed themselves as presenting the opposite side of journalism as the Star Journal-Chieftain and standing apart from other Spanish-speaking media such as Radio KAPI and El Progresso.

They chose the name "La Cucaracha" because of the symbolism of the cockroach: the "lowly insect which has roamed the Earth since before the dinosaurs and has survived every natural catastrophe... The Chicano too, has survived." They cited General Francisco Villa's use of the name for his supply train and as a marching song, and author Oscar Zeta Acosta who wrote Revolt of the Cockroach People.

La Cucaracha eventually had a reach of 36 states and 6 countries.

== Community involvement ==
The newspaper focused on issues that faced the Chicano community. Many of these issues were excluded by larger media outlets or written from a non-Chicano perspective. They covered police brutality, education, land rights and voting, as well as local and international news.

The staff of La Cucaracha not only produced this newspaper but supported other creators in the Chicano community. The staff also produced a documentary film, La Tierra: Last Stand in Costilla County, helped found another newspaper with Ray Otero and Shirley Romero called "Tierra y Libertad, and "!Ya Basta!" on the Western Slope.

The newspaper worked closely with community organizations such as Pueblo Neighborhood Health Centers (PNHC) to serve the Chicano population. PNHC provided financial support through paid advertising, and La Cucaracha provided an important means of communication with the community.

== Print End ==
La Cucaracha was published monthly from 1976 to 1979, then moved to biweekly until its end in November 1983.

A 50th Cinco de Mayo Special Edition was published on May 5, 2020. The in-person celebration was cancelled due to COVID-19, but the special issue was meant to bring original staff members back together, and to share updates on important information that had dominated the pages during its original run.

== See also ==
- African-American newspapers
- Chicano movement
- El Grito del Norte
- La Raza (newspaper)
- Underground press
