= Museo de las Americas =

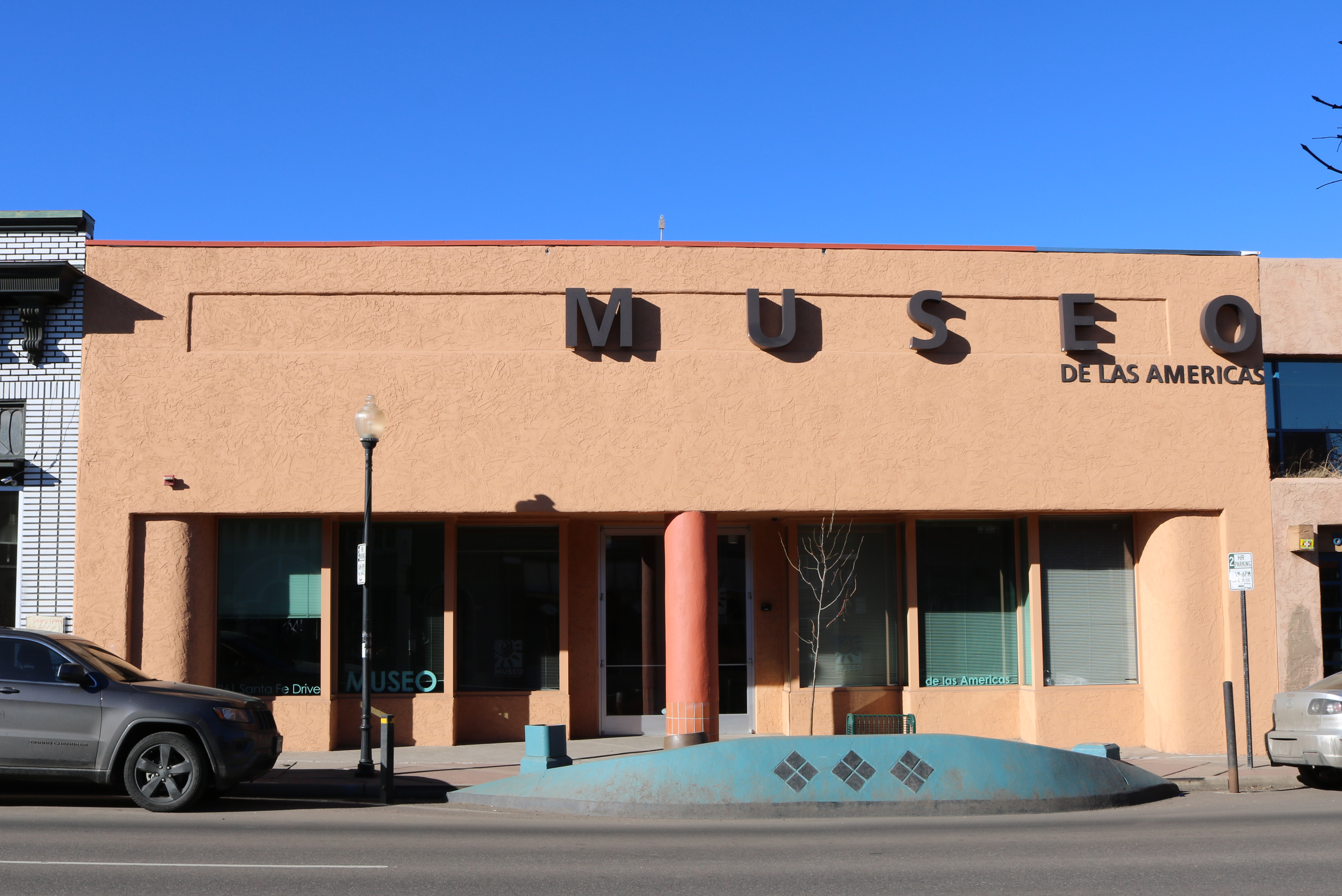
- The museum's entrance on Santa Fe Drive.
- Established: 1992
- Location: 861 Santa Fe Drive; Denver, Colorado 80216
- Coordinates: 39.73005°N 104.99888°W
- Type: Latino art museum
- Website: www.museo.org

Museo de las Americas is a fine arts museum in Denver, Colorado. It is dedicated to educating the community through collecting, preserving, interpreting and exhibiting the diverse arts and cultures of the Americas from ancient to contemporary, through innovative exhibitions and programs.

Founded in 1992, Museo de las Americas purchased its current 12,000 sq. ft. building in 1994, located at 861 Santa Fe Drive in the heart of Denver's 'Santa Fe Arts District'. Over the last two decades, Museo has maintained its status as one of the southwest's premier Latino art museum, including its own permanent collection of pre-Columbian, folk art and contemporary Latino art pieces, featuring avant garde international exhibitions as well as a focus on regional artists of import.

Since 1992, the permanent collection of the museum has received more than 3,000 objects representing art, history and traditions of Latin American cultures. Textiles, ceramics, masks, jewelry, basketry, wooden utilitarian objects, paintings, pre-Columbian figures and contemporary art pieces of mixed media represent this collection. The museum also has a research library.

Museo is the recipient of many awards, including the Downtown Denver Partnership Award (2000), the City of Denver's Design Award (2005), the Martin Luther King Community Service Award (2006), and Denver's Award for Excellence in the Arts (2009).

Museum patrons will discover artistic renderings that depict an Aztec Sun Stone and the Tenochtitlán civilization within this organization.

In 2016, the artistic group Sin Huellas installed an exhibit called "Detention Nation" in the museum, an installation that included a mock prison. The exhibit aimed to show what it's like to be held in an immigration detention facility.
