= National Register of Historic Places listings in Alamosa County, Colorado =

Location of Alamosa County in Colorado

This is a list of the National Register of Historic Places listings in Alamosa County, Colorado.

This is intended to be a complete list of the properties and districts on the National Register of Historic Places in Alamosa County, Colorado, United States. The locations of National Register properties and districts for which the latitude and longitude coordinates are included below, may be seen in a map.

There are 16 properties and districts listed on the National Register in the county.

This National Park Service list is complete through NPS recent listings posted September 25, 2026.

== Current listings ==
	Name on the Register	Image	Date listed	Location	City or town	Description
1	Alamosa County Courthouse	Alamosa County Courthouse	September 29, 1995 (#95001149)	702 4th St. 37°28′08″N 105°52′02″W	Alamosa	
2	Alamosa Post Office	Alamosa Post Office	July 22, 2009 (#09000544)	703 4th St. 37°28′09″N 105°52′02″W	Alamosa	
3	Alamosa Spanish Cemetery	Alamosa Spanish Cemetery	December 29, 2025 (#100012458)	8001-8079 Road 8 South; 37°27′35″N 105°53′35″W	Alamosa	
4	American National Bank Building	American National Bank Building	April 15, 1999 (#99000446)	500 State Ave. 37°28′05″N 105°51′53″W	Alamosa	
5	Denver and Rio Grande Railroad Depot	Denver and Rio Grande Railroad Depot	February 11, 1993 (#93000034)	610 State St. 37°28′00″N 105°51′53″W	Alamosa	
6	Denver and Rio Grande Railroad Locomotive No.169	Denver and Rio Grande Railroad Locomotive No.169	March 12, 2001 (#01000230)	Along Chamber Dr. within Cole Park; 37°28′10″N 105°51′45″W	Alamosa	
7	First Baptist Church	First Baptist Church	May 22, 2005 (#05000425)	408 State Ave. 37°28′08″N 105°51′53″W	Alamosa	
8	Howard Store	Howard Store	February 1, 2006 (#05001597)	8681 Main St. 37°44′47″N 105°52′37″W	Hooper	
9	Husung Hardware	Husung Hardware	January 28, 2000 (#00000003)	625 Main St. 37°28′06″N 105°51′57″W	Alamosa	
10	Medano Ranch Headquarters	Medano Ranch Headquarters	February 4, 2004 (#03001543)	2.6 miles north of County Road 6N, Medano-Zapata Ranch; 37°42′52″N 105°40′55″W	Mosca	A Nature Conservancy-owned historic ranch property located within Great Sand Dunes National Park; access is limited.
11	Mt. Pleasant School	Mt. Pleasant School	May 3, 2006 (#06000327)	Junction of County Roads 3, S. and 103, S. 37°31′52″N 105°59′01″W	Alamosa	
12	Sacred Heart Catholic Church	Sacred Heart Catholic Church	July 15, 1998 (#98000855)	727 4th St. 37°28′11″N 105°52′04″W	Alamosa	
13	St. Thomas Episcopal Church	St. Thomas Episcopal Church	April 22, 2003 (#03000285)	607 4th St. 37°28′10″N 105°51′57″W	Alamosa	
14	Superintendent's Residence, Great Sand Dunes National Monument	Superintendent's Residence, Great Sand Dunes National Monument	November 2, 1989 (#89001761)	State Highway 150 southwest of Mosca; 37°43′30″N 105°31′05″W	Mosca	At the entrance gate to the Great Sand Dunes National Park.
15	Trujillo Homestead	Trujillo Homestead	February 4, 2004 (#03001544)	Medano-Zapata Ranch; 37°44′00″N 105°44′09″W	Mosca	On Nature Conservancy land in or near the Great Sand Dunes National Park; access is limited.
16	Zapata Ranch Headquarters	Zapata Ranch Headquarters	April 5, 1993 (#93000199)	5303 State Highway 150; 37°39′10″N 105°35′33″W	Mosca	A Nature Conservancy-owned historic ranch property located near the Great Sand Dunes National Park.

== See also ==
- List of National Historic Landmarks in Colorado
- List of National Register of Historic Places in Colorado
- Bibliography of Colorado
- Geography of Colorado
- History of Colorado
- Index of Colorado-related articles
- List of Colorado-related lists
- Outline of Colorado
