= Consolidated Communications of Vermont =

Telephone operating company

Consolidated Communications of Vermont Company, LLC
- Formerly: Telephone Operating Company of Vermont LLC (2008–2019)
- Type: Subsidiary
- Industry: Telecommunications
- Predecessor: Verizon New England
- Founded: 2008; 18 years ago
- Headquarters: South Burlington, VT, United States
- Products: Local Telephone Service
- Parent: Consolidated Communications of Northern New England (2008–present)
- Website: http://www.consolidated.com/

Consolidated Communications of Vermont Company, LLC is a telephone operating company owned by Consolidated Communications of Northern New England, a subsidiary of Consolidated Communications.

The company was created following Verizon's 2008 sale of its telephone lines in Maine, New Hampshire, and Vermont to FairPoint Communications. All of Verizon's assets in those states were grouped into a new holding company to be sold off and merged into FairPoint. All three states had been served by Verizon New England, formerly New England Telephone, a Bell Operating Company. FairPoint was subsequently acquired by Consolidated Communications.

The company was named Telephone Operating Company of Vermont LLC until March 19, 2019.

The company is not connected to FairPoint Vermont, an operating company consisting of former GTE lines that FairPoint owned before acquiring the Verizon assets.

== See also ==
Pay telephone operated by Telephone Operating Company of Vermont in Randolph

- Verizon New England
- NYNEX
- Consolidated Communications of Northern New England
