= Colorado Gators Reptile Park =

Zoo in Mosca, Colorado, United States

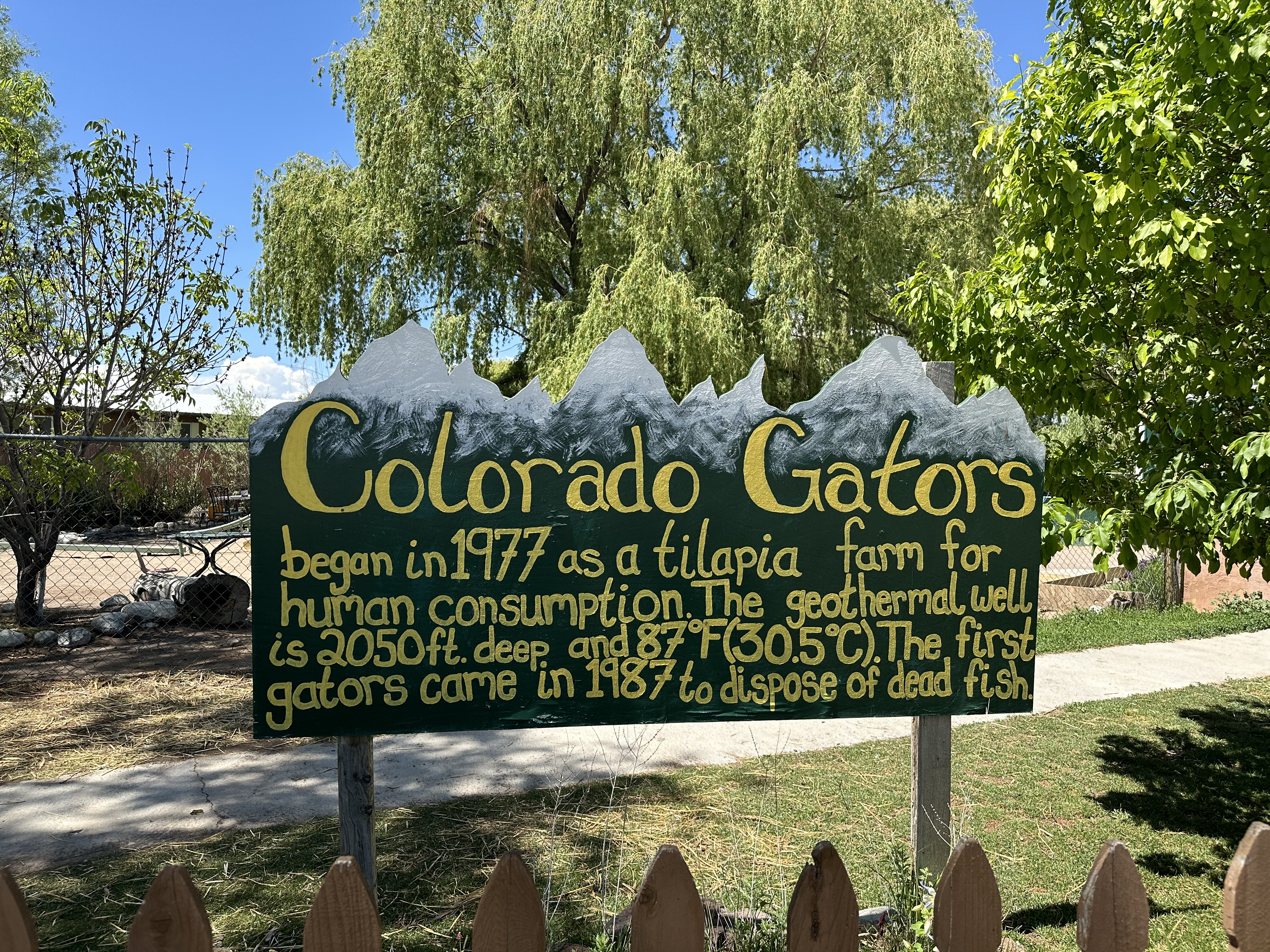
- Marquee at Colorado Gators Reptile Park
- Interactive map of Colorado Gators Reptile Park
- 37.705893°N 105.870556°W
- Date opened: 1990
- Location: Mosca, Colorado
- Land area: 80 acres (32 ha)
- Website: coloradogators.com

Colorado Gators Reptile Park was opened to the public in 1990, in Mosca, Colorado, United States. Located 17 miles (27 km) north of Alamosa, Colorado, it started as a tilapia farm in 1977, and now includes a bird sanctuary, reptile rescue, education, and display, and a biodome.

A geothermal well on the property creates ponds and wetlands for the alligators, but also provides habitat and food for many water-birds and waterfowl. The "Two Mile Creek Wildlife Habitat" lets visitors view alligators, reptiles, and birds in a natural setting, and to go fishing, boating, and picnicking. Over 125 species of birds have been sighted at the farm.

== History ==
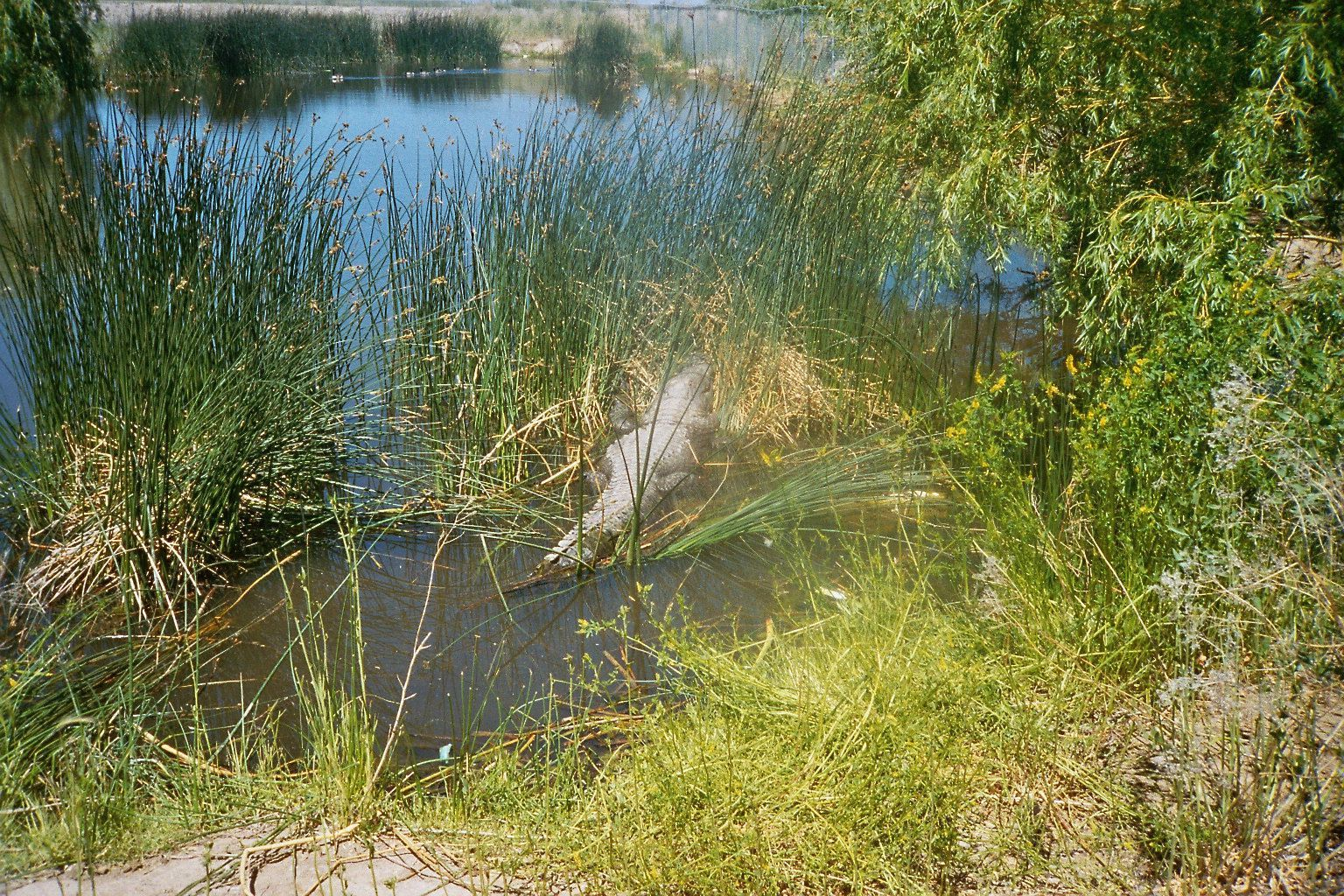
Wetlands at the farm

In 1977, Erwin and Lynne Young purchased 80 acres (32 ha) on which they started a farm to grow tilapia and African perch. The farm includes a geothermal well that is used to keep the water at a temperature appropriate for the fish. In 1987, they purchased 100 one-year-old alligators to help dispose of fish-processing waste. The alligators grew, and locals wanted to see them, so the farm was opened to the public in 1990.

Over the years, the farm has also become home to many reptiles that are unwanted, abused, and sometimes dangerous, when people discover that they can no longer care for them. One of the goals of the farm is to help educate the public as to the challenges and dangers of trying to keep reptiles as pets.

== Events ==
The farm holds "Gatorfest" on the first weekend in August each year. This is world's first Gator Rodeo and Roundup, and includes roping, riding, and barrel racing.

== Education ==
Education programs created by the Colorado Gators Reptile Park aim to teach people about the biology, behavior, and ecological role of reptiles, as well as which reptiles make good pets and which will eventually get big enough to become impossible to handle. The programs include live specimens such as turtles, tortoises, alligators, snakes, and lizards, some of which the audience is allowed to touch.

== See also ==
- UFO Watchtower
