= William C. Ferguson =

William Charles Ferguson
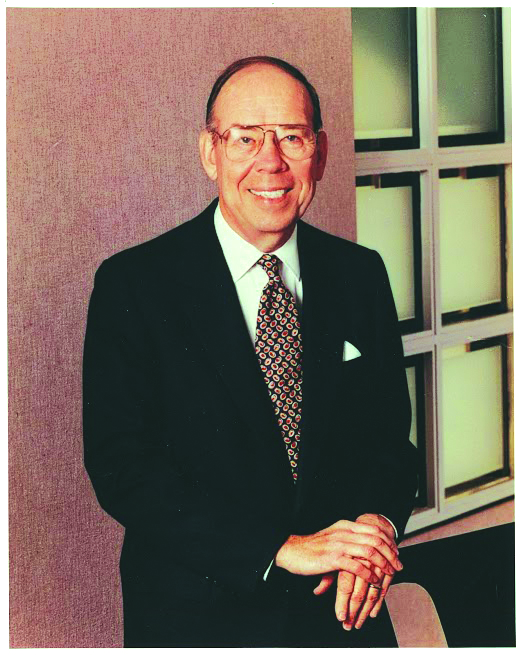
- Born: October 26, 1930; Detroit, Michigan, U.S.
- Died: October 14, 2015 (aged 84); Jupiter, Florida, U.S.
- Education: Albion College, Michigan
- Occupations: Chairman & CEO, NYNEX Corporation
- Spouse: Joyce Soby Ferguson (m. 1952)
- Children: Laura Ferguson (b. 1955), Ellen Ferguson Keleman (b. 1958), Joanne Ferguson Gerrish (b. 1967)

William C. Ferguson (died October 14, 2015) was an American telecommunications executive who was chairman and CEO of NYNEX.

== Early life ==
William "Bill" Ferguson was born in Detroit, Michigan in 1930 to William and Betty Ferguson. His parents, a Scottish immigrant and a Missouri farm girl, moved the family to Akron, Ohio, where Ferguson spent much of his early childhood. Ten years later, the family moved to Trenton, Michigan. At age 14, Ferguson met Joyce Soby, his future wife and partner in his philanthropic work, on a school hayride. At Trenton High School, Ferguson played basketball, football, and baseball and graduated in 1948, becoming the first member of his family to receive more than a ninth-grade education.

In order to fund his college tuition, Ferguson held several jobs throughout high school and college summers: loading rims in box cars at Firestone, working on a labor gang at Penn Salt in Wyandotte, Michigan, and caddying at Grosse Ile Golf and Country Club.

June of ’52 was a busy one: graduating college, marrying his high-school sweetheart and joining Michigan Bell as a management trainee, only to be drafted into the U.S. Army in September 1952. Stationed in Fort Monmouth, NJ, as a Corporal teaching electronics at the Signal Corps School, Ferguson returned to Michigan Bell in Detroit in 1954 to continue his career.

An avid three-handicap golfer, Ferguson was a member of the Grosse Ile Golf and Country Club in Michigan, Winged Foot Golf Club in New York, Jupiter Hills Country Club in Florida and several clubs in Hilton Head, SC.

Faith also played a role in Ferguson's life, calling the United Methodist Churches of Trenton, MI, and Armonk, NY, his sanctuaries.

== Education ==
Ferguson graduated from Albion College in 1952 with a B.A. in Liberal Arts, majoring in mathematics with physics and economics minors, and also earning a Secondary Teaching Certificate. He later received honorary doctorates from Albion, New York Institute of Technology and Pace University. As an Albion student, Ferguson was a four-year participant in baseball and member of the 1950 MIAA Championship Baseball Team. In 1997 he was inducted into the Albion College sports Hall of Fame, and was the master of ceremonies of the Albion Hall of Fame dinner from 1989 to 1994. Ferguson was also a member of the Alpha Tau Omega fraternity.

== Career ==
Ferguson had 40 years of telecommunication experience including as president and CEO of New York Telephone and executive vice president and chief operating officer of Michigan Bell Telephone. Ferguson joined Michigan Bell in 1952 and was elected an officer in 1971. He became vice president for New York Telephone in 1977, then returned to Michigan Bell in 1978 as executive VP and COO, holding that position until 1983, when he was appointed president and CEO of New York Telephone. Ferguson remained in that position until 1987 when he was elected vice chairman of NYNEX’s two major subsidiaries (New England Telephone and New York Telephone). He retired as chairman and CEO of NYNEX in April 1995, after holding that position for six years. Ferguson remained on the NYNEX board of directors until the end of 1995.

== Philanthropy and service ==
A firm believer in a liberal arts education, Ferguson gave back to his alma mater throughout his lifetime. Member of the Albion College board of trustees from 1980 to 2004 and chairman from ’89 to ’96, acting president of the college from 1995 to 1996, visiting professor, guest speaker and recipient of an honorary doctorate.

In 1996, he and Joyce established and supported numerous scholarships and endowments, with the most notable support being the Ferguson Student, Technology and Administrative Services Building dedicated in 2002. With the help of his wife Joyce, William established scholarships for Albion College students in education, communications studies, music, and the Carl A. Gerstacker Institute for Business and Management. The Fergusons also established endowments to support the Art and Art History Department, faculty development, Whitehouse Nature Center, and the groundbreaking Ferguson Center for Technology-Aided Teaching. The Fergusons dedicated the Ferguson Dance Studio in Kresge Gymnasium to their three daughters: Laura Ferguson, Ellen Keleman, and Joanne Gerrish. In 2002, the William C. Ferguson Student, Technology, and Administrative building was dedicated as a new home for the college president's office; the offices of academic affairs, finance and management, information technology, institutional advancement, and student affairs; and a twenty-four hour computer lab.
An active member of several corporate boards, including Viacom, General RE, Best Foods, Corn Products, Eircom, HSBC USA and others, Ferguson also held many charitable posts such as chairman of the board, United Way Tri-State and chairman of the United Way New York City Drive, vice chairman of the Detroit Symphony Orchestra and vice chairman of the Detroit Chamber of Commerce.
