= Consolidated Communications of Missouri =

Telephone company

Consolidated Communications of Missouri Company
- Company type: Private (Subsidiary of Consolidated Communications)
- Industry: Telecommunications
- Founded: 2006
- Headquarters: United States
- Products: Local Telephone Service
- Parent: FairPoint (2006-2017); Consolidated (2017-present)
- Website: http://www.consolidated.com/

Consolidated Communications of Missouri Company is a telephone operating company owned by Consolidated Communications.

The company was created following FairPoint's acquisition of the independent Cass County Telephone Company in 2006. The company serves Garden City in area code 660 and Cleveland, Drexel, and other towns in area code 816. The company also serves exchanges in Kansas directly across the state line from Cleveland and Drexel. These exchanges are located in area code 913.

== See also ==
- FairPoint Communications
