= PTS =

PTS or Pts may refer to:

== Businesses and organisations ==
=== Businesses ===
- Pacific Telemanagement Services, an American payphone operator
- Public Television Service, public broadcaster in Taiwan
- Swedish Post and Telecom Authority (Swedish: Post- och telestyrelsen, PTS)
- Paramount Television Service, unrealized fourth television network attempt

=== Politics ===
- São Toméan Workers Party (Portuguese: Partido Trabalhista Santomense, PTS)
- Socialist Workers' Party (Argentina) (Spanish: Partido de los Trabajadores Socialistas, PTS)

=== Schools and colleges ===
- Palmer Trinity School, Palmetto Bay, Florida, U.S.
- Pittsburgh Theological Seminary, Pennsylvania, U.S.
- Princeton Theological Seminary, Princeton, New Jersey, U.S.

=== Other organisations ===
- Pali Text Society, British text publication society
- Kind Space (formerly Pink Triangle Services), an LGBT community centre in Ottawa, Canada
- Protestant Truth Society, a British religious organisation

== Science, technology and mathematics ==
=== Biology and medicine ===
==== Biochemistry ====
- PTS (gene), 6-pyruvoyltetrahydropterin synthase, a human gene
- Peroxisomal targeting signal, in protein targeting
- PEP group translocation, or phosphotransferase system, in bacterial sugar uptake

==== Medical conditions ====
- Parsonage–Turner syndrome, pain and/or atrophy in the shoulder and upper arm
- Post-thrombotic syndrome, a long-term effect of deep vein thrombosis
- Post-traumatic stress

=== Chemistry ===
- Platinum(II) sulfide, the inorganic compound PtS

=== Computing ===
- Pay to surf, an early internet business model
- Phoronix Test Suite, benchmark software
- Presentation time stamp, metadata in MPEG video or other streams
- Pseudoterminal slave
- Public test server, a game server for early new content

=== Mathematics ===
- Pure type system, in logic

== Transport and vehicles ==
- PTS (amphibious vehicle), a Soviet tank
- Personal Track Safety, British rail work practices

== Other uses ==
- PTS, abbreviation for a points decision in combat sports
- Pts or ₧, Peseta (disambiguation), a number of currencies
- pts, abbreviation for the plural of pint, a unit of capacity
- Potential trouble source, in Scientology

== See also ==
- Point (typography)
