= Indian Grove =

Indian Grove may refer to:

- Indian Grove, listed on the NRHP in Colorado
- Indian Grove Township, Livingston County, Illinois
- Indian Grove, Missouri
- Indian Grove, North Carolina
