= Greater Sandhill Solar Plant =

Power plant in Colorado, USA

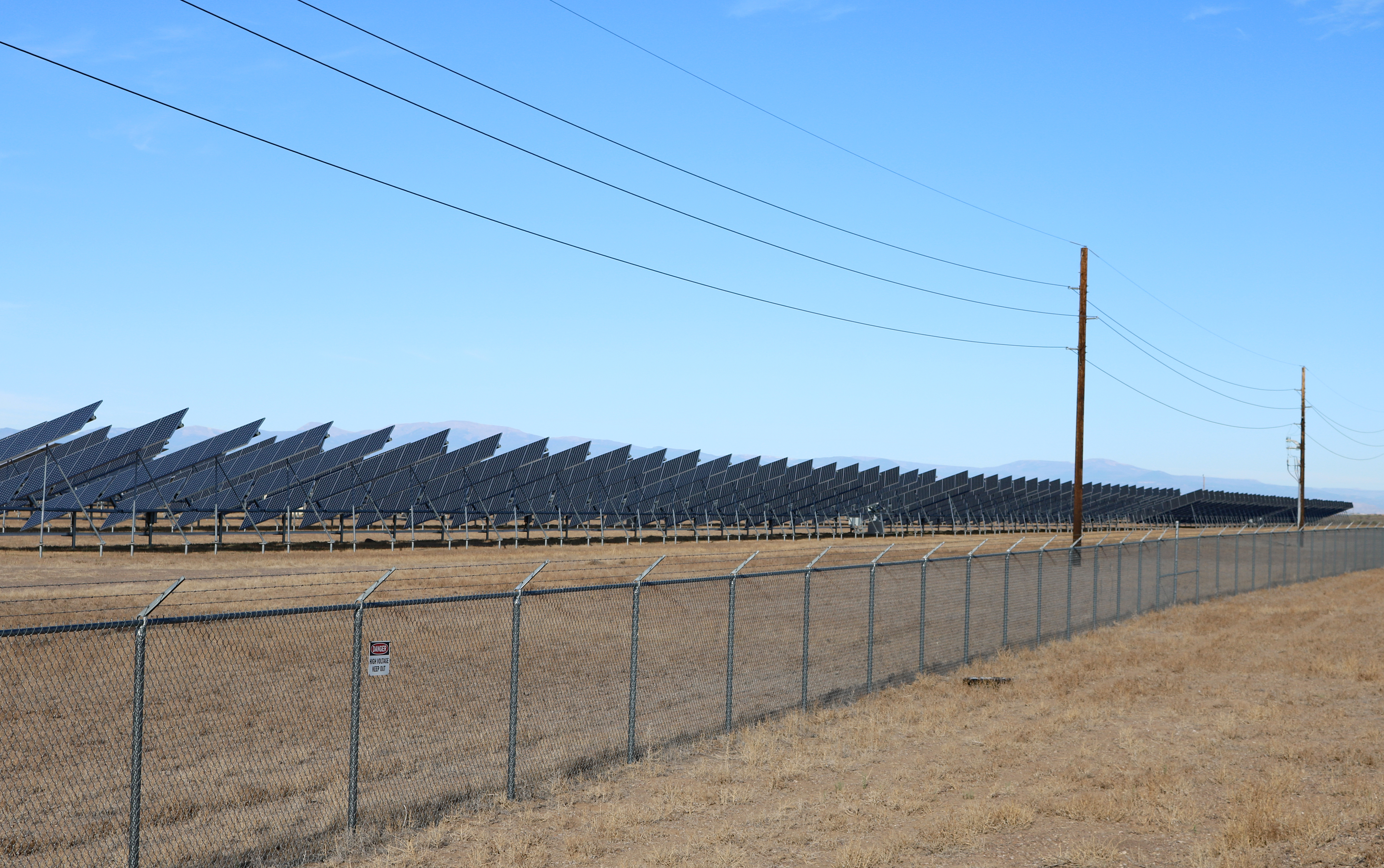
- The station viewed from Lane 8 North, showing the movable panels
- Country: United States
- Location: San Luis Valley, Mosca, Colorado
- Coordinates: 37°41′08″N 105°53′27″W
- Status: Operational
- Construction began: March 2010
- Commission date: March 2011
- Owners: Metlife and John Hancock Financial Services
- Operator: SunPower

Solar farm
- Type: Flat-panel PV
- Site area: 200 acres (81 ha)

Power generation
- Nameplate capacity: 19 MW_{AC}
- Capacity factor: 28.4% (average 2011-2021)
- Annual net output: 47.3 GW·h, 236 MW·h/acre

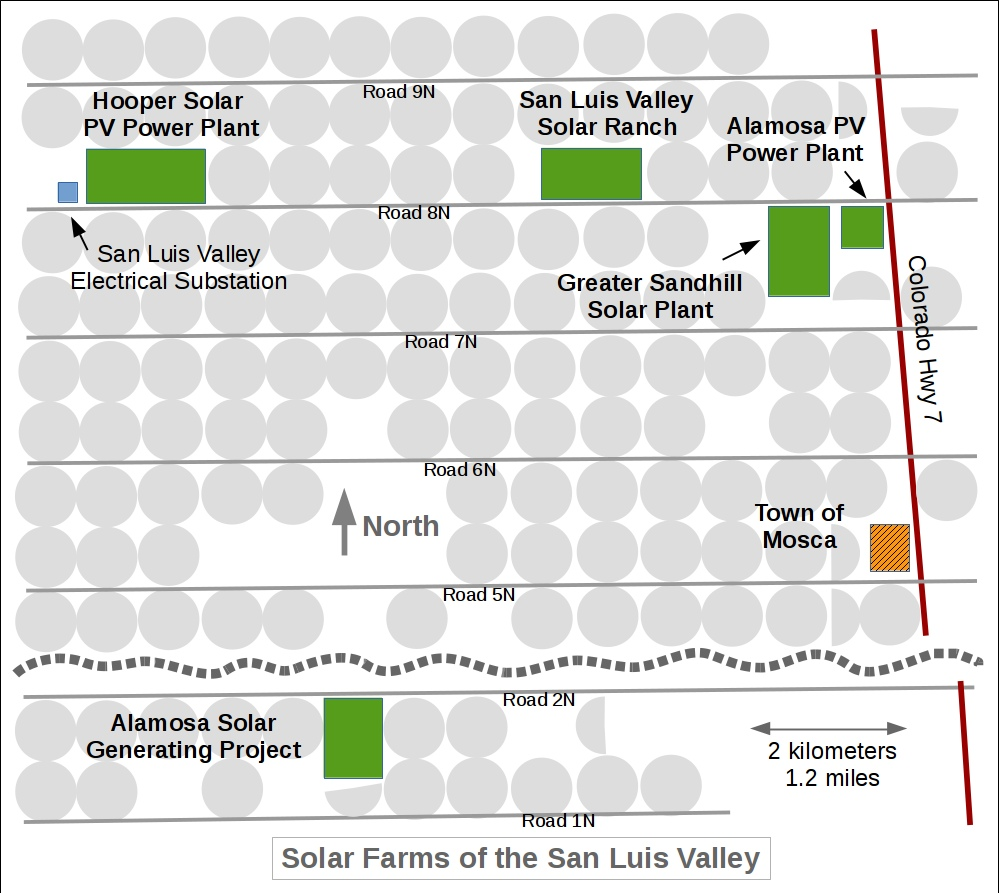
A map of solar farms in the San Luis valley

The Greater Sandhill Solar Plant is a 19 megawatt (MW_{AC}) photovoltaic power station in the San Luis Valley, located near the town of Mosca, Colorado. It was the largest solar facility in the state when it came online at the end of 2010. The electricity is being sold to Public Service of Colorado, a subsidiary of Xcel Energy, under a long-term power purchase agreement.

== Facility details ==
The facility occupies about 200 acres of a 320 acre plot of water-constrained former agricultural land, and is sited adjacent to the Alamosa photovoltaic power plant which was completed two years earlier. It was developed and built by SunPower using the company's most-advanced high-efficiency technology. It contains about 50,000 modules which are mounted onto T-20 trackers. This tracker design was newly released in 2010, and was marketed as enabling the highest production.

The plant is owned by Metlife and John Hancock Financial Services, which also partnered to finance the construction. Buesing Corp of Phoenix AZ was contracted to set the 16,800 helical screw pile foundations. The facility was completed in nine months, and was at full production by the end of December 2010. The start of commercial operations was announced in March 2011.

== Electricity production ==
Generation (MW·h) of Greater Sandhill
Year	Jan	Feb	Mar	Apr	May	Jun	Jul	Aug	Sep	Oct	Nov	Dec	Total
2010									2,763	1,841	2,113	1,445	8,162
2011	2,508	3,119	3,927	5,056	5,565	5,966	4,635	5,244	3,983	3,933	2,652	2,274	48,862
2012	987	1,191	1,625	2,595	5,196	5,612	5,456	5,569	5,850	5,918	4,864	4,266	49,131
2013	2,816	3,218	3,990	3,874	4,775	4,872	4,653	4,637	4,289	4,450	3,056	3,058	47,689
2014	3,024	3,420	4,281	3,990	4,441	4,973	4,165	5,072	4,019	3,804	3,102	2,087	46,378
2015	2,196	3,132	4,431	4,365	4,044	4,678	3,762	4,349	4,041	3,212	3,201	4,242	45,653
2016	1,717	2,494	3,057	3,035	3,586	3,772	3,937	3,132	6,810	6,578	4,846	4,340	47,303
2017	1,896	2,954	4,133	4,563	5,379	5,829	5,056	4,231	3,544	4,197	2,677	2,749	47,210
2018	2,461	2,894	3,742	4,535	5,227	5,617	4,896	4,888	4,698	3,503	2,888	2,091	47,439
2019	2,436	2,567	3,823	4,501	4,792	5,390	5,102	5,194	4,287	4,214	2,619	1,909	46,834
2020	2,617	2,757	4,223	4,720	5,480	5,313	5,507	4,488	4,374	3,296	2,840	2,146	47,760
2021	2,463	2,719	3,475	4,219	4,157	5,168	5,565	5,283	4,521	3,503	2,616	2,344	46,033
Average Annual Production (years 2011-2021) --->													47,299

== See also ==
- Alamosa Photovoltaic Power Plant
- San Luis Valley Solar Ranch
- Solar power in Colorado
- Solar power in the United States
- Renewable energy in the United States
- Renewable portfolio standard
