= Consolidated Communications of Northern New England =

Phone company

Consolidated Communications of Northern New England Company, LLC
- Trade name: Consolidated Communications - NNE
- Formerly: Northern New England Telephone Operations LLC (2006–2019)
- Type: Subsidiary
- Industry: Telecommunications
- Predecessor: Verizon New England
- Founded: 2006; 20 years ago
- Area served: Maine, New Hampshire
- Products: Local Telephone Service
- Parent: Verizon New England (2006-2008); FairPoint (2008-2017); Consolidated Communications (2017–present)
- Subsidiaries: Consolidated Communications of Vermont
- Website: http://www.fairpoint.com/

Consolidated Communications of Northern New England Company, LLC is a Bell Operating Company founded in 2006. It is a subsidiary of Consolidated Communications and operates telephone lines in Maine and New Hampshire formerly served by Verizon New England.

== History ==
Northern New England Telephone Operations, Inc. was created as a subsidiary of Verizon New England to operate exchanges that Verizon was preparing to sell to FairPoint Communications in Maine, New Hampshire, and Vermont.

=== Sale to FairPoint ===
In 2008, the company was spun off from Verizon and merged into FairPoint. One of the conditions of the sale, despite protest by FairPoint, was that NNETO would be regulated as a Bell Operating Company. One implication of this condition required FairPoint to follow rules applying to the Baby Bells under the Second Computer Inquiry decision in their newly acquired territories.

Following the sale, Northern New England Telephone Operations was converted to a limited liability company (LLC). The company's operations in Vermont were separated into Telephone Operating Company of Vermont, which is wholly owned by NNETO.

NNETO is separate from Northern Telephone Company of Maine, a FairPoint subsidiary which consists of some former Contel lines sold off by GTE in 1994.

=== Sale to Consolidated Communications ===
Effective January 28, 2019, the company was renamed Consolidated Communications of Northern New England Company, LLC following the purchase of FairPoint by Consolidated Communications.
