= Mutilation of "Snippy" the horse =

1967 death of a horse in Colorado, US

Photograph of Snippy after death showing reportedly-"clean" cuts.

The mutilation of "Snippy" the horse was the death and alleged dissection of a Colorado horse that was first widely-reported on October 5, 1967. Mainstream experts concluded the death was the result of natural causes, though sensationalized press and unsubstantiated folklore questioned whether the death and mutilation might be linked to Satanic cults, intelligence operations, or even flying saucers. The skeletal remains are currently part of a UFO tourism attraction.

== Initial coverage ==
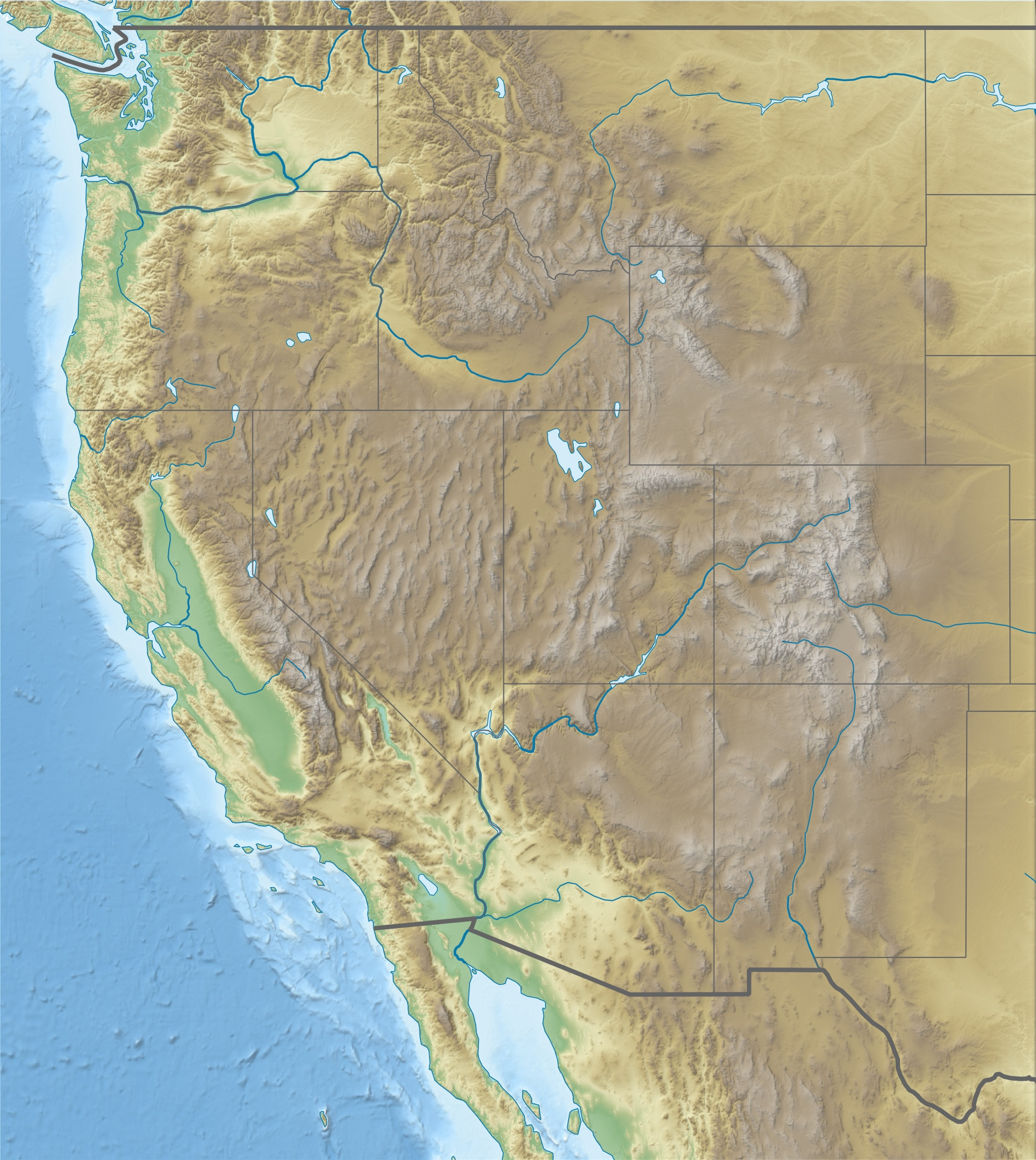
The Snippy case occurred on the Harry King Ranch, located in Colorado's San Luis Valley near Alamosa.

On October 5, 1967, the papers across the country published sensationalized headlines such as "Flying Saucers Killed My Horse!".

Press accounts told the story of "Snippy", a 3-year-old Appaloosa mare that was stabled at the Harry King Ranch of Alamosa, Colorado. Press reported that Snippy had failed to return to the ranch for her usual evening drink on September 7, prompting a search. On September 9, rancher Harry King found Snippy dead and mutilated about a quarter of a mile away.

According to press reports, King found the animal completely skinned, with the meat of the neck and shoulders missing, leaving only bleached bones. Cuts were described as "completely smooth", and it was reported there was a total absence of blood in the animal and on the ground. King noted an absence of tracks around the dead horse.

The following day, King returned to the site with Snippy's owners, Burl Lewis and his wife. The site was now reportedly pervaded with a "sickening sweet odor" and the once-bleached bones had turned a bright pink. Mrs. Lewis reporting handling a piece of the horse's flesh and described it as "sticky" and slick; she reported her hand began to burn and turned red, the burning continued until her hand had been washed. The Lewises phoned Alamosa County Sheriff Ben Phillips, who told them that the death was probably due to "a lightning strike" and never bothered to visit the site.

The group reportedly discovered indications of an aircraft landing—the terrain featured "circular exhaust marks", "squashed bushes", and circular indentations in the dirt. A geiger counter alleged reported high radiation counts around the exhaust marks and flattened bushes. By September 23, the bones had allegedly turned black.

The press reported the rancher's mother, Agnes King aged 87, claimed a large object passed over the ranch house the day of the Snippy's disappearance, though she could not identify the object because she was not wearing her glasses. Other local UFO reports were discussed.

== Reception and influence ==
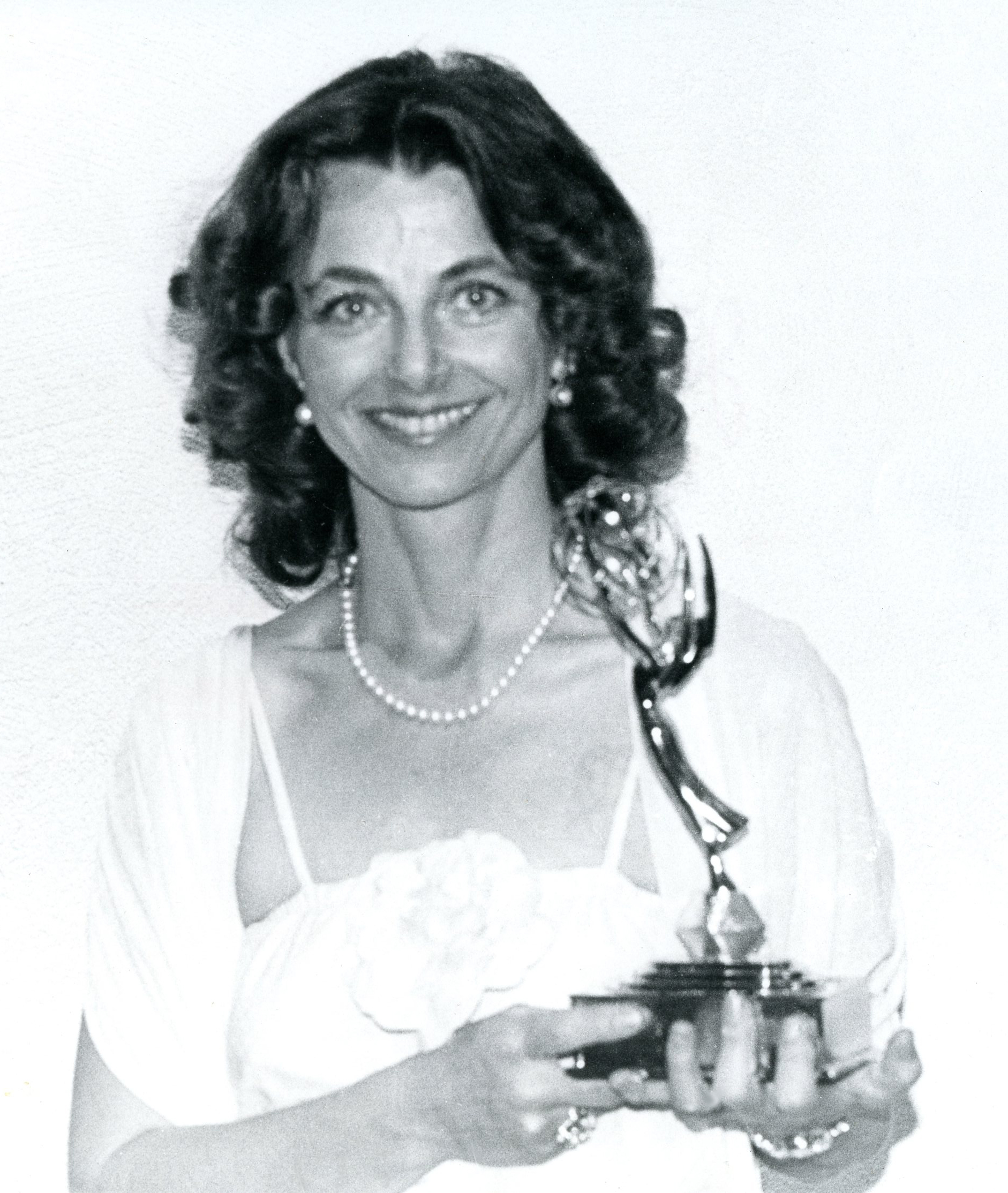
Linda Moulton Howe, seen here receiving an Emmy for her 1981 documentary on animal mutilations, popularized the Snippy case.

The story was republished by the wider press and distributed nationwide; this case was the first to feature speculation that extraterrestrial beings and unidentified flying objects were associated with mutilation. By December 1, civilian UFO researchers from NICAP reported that the case was "neither a UFO case nor particularly mysterious." That week, Snippy's bones were turned over to a local veterinarian for preservation. Later press coverage mentions that the horse had been shot "in the rump". Two students from Alamosa State College confessed to sneaking out into the pasture and shooting the horse several weeks after the case was publicized.

A subsequent investigation by the Condon Committee concluded that "There was no evidence to support the assertion that the horse's death was associated in any way to abnormal causes". In 1968, Edward Condon, leader of the committee, recalled the Snippy case as the "most bizarre" report that his group had investigated.

In 1968, the story was further propagated by paranormal author John Keel and sci-fi comics creator Otto Binder.

=== Subsequent interest ===
Beginning in the 1970s, the US experienced waves of cattle mutilations which were likened to Snippy's death. Mutilation investigator Linda Moulton Howe revisited the Snippy case, interviewing witnesses for her 1989 book An Alien Harvest. According to her sources, the horse was not actually named "Snippy"; Snippy had been the sire of the "mutilated" mare, which was actually named "Lady". Despite this, Snippy remains the common name used to refer to the dead horse.

The preserved skeleton was passed from owner to owner until 2021, when the skeleton was obtained by the UFO Watchtower, a Colorado tourist attraction.
