= Alamosa Photovoltaic Power Plant =

Photovoltaic power station

Alamosa PV Power Plant
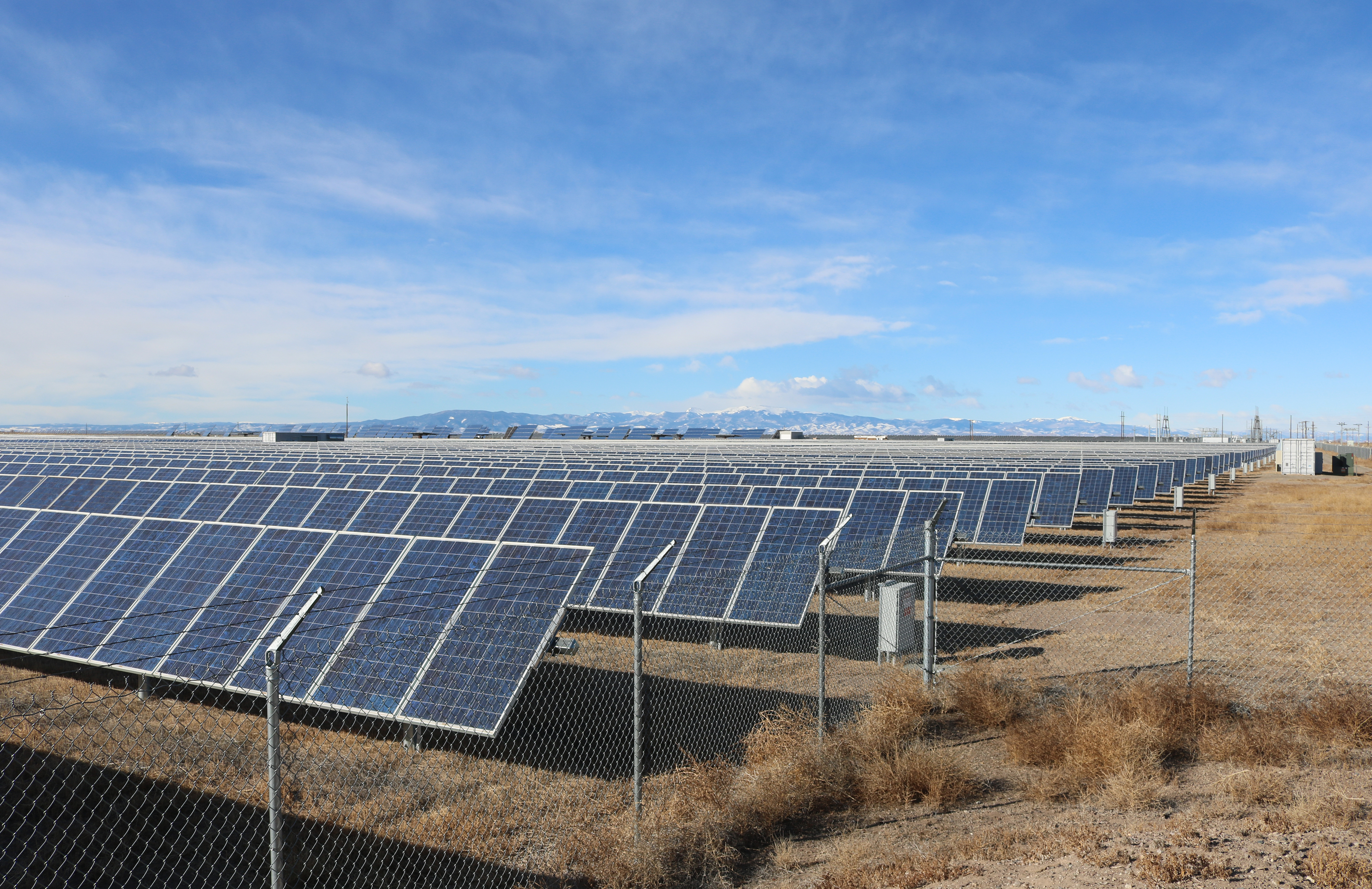
- The plant in 2020
- Country: United States
- Location: San Luis Valley, Mosca, Colorado
- Coordinates: 37°41′25″N 105°52′40″W
- Status: Operational
- Construction began: April 2007
- Commission date: December 2007
- Owner: TerraForm Power
- Operator: TerraForm Power

Solar farm
- Type: Flat-panel PV
- Site area: 82 acres (33 ha)

Power generation
- Nameplate capacity: 8.2 MW_{p}, 7.7 MW_{AC}
- Capacity factor: 25.7% (average 2008-2014)
- Annual net output: 17.4 GW·h, 210 MW·h/acre

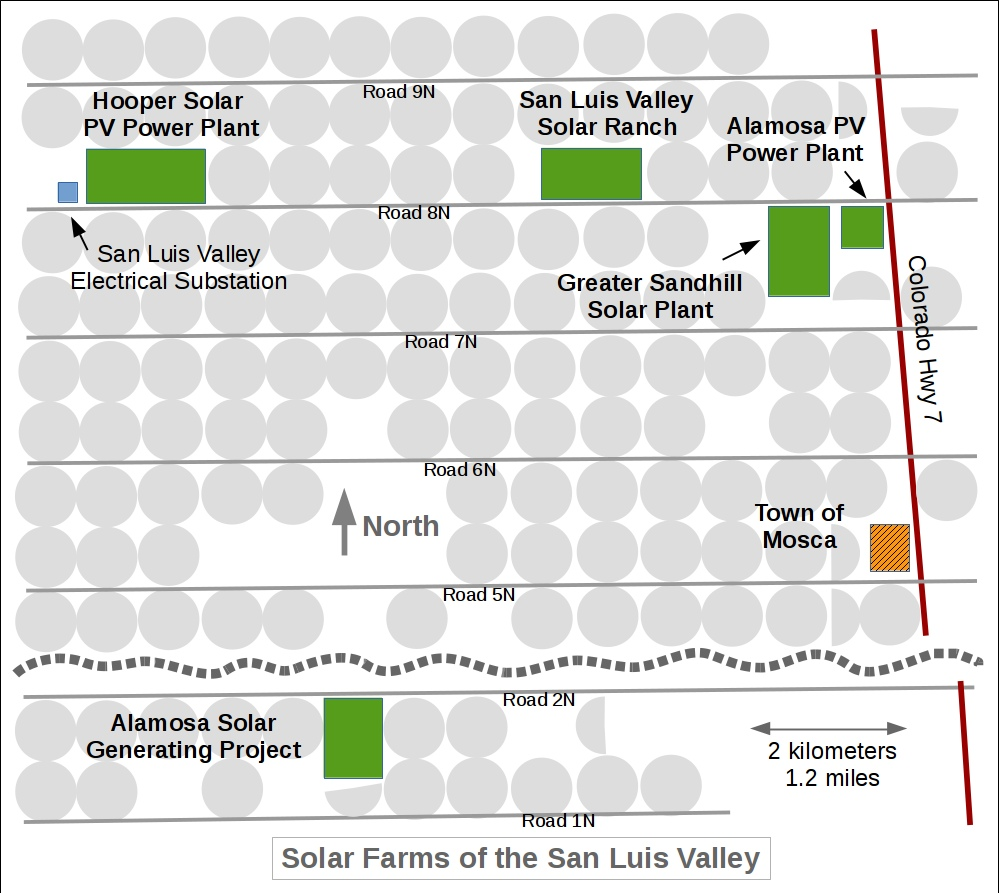
A map of solar farms in the San Luis valley

Alamosa Photovoltaic Power Plant, is a 7.7 MW_{AC} (8.2 MW_{p}) photovoltaic power station located in San Luis Valley, Colorado. The facility was the largest in the United States to service a major public utility when its activation was announced on December 17, 2007. It was the second largest plant after the U.S. Air Force's Nellis Solar Power Plant which was inaugurated the same day. The electricity is being sold to Public Service of Colorado, a subsidiary of Xcel Energy, under a 20-year power purchase agreement.

== Facility details ==
The plant occupies 82 acres of a 160 acre parcel of land adjacent to Highway 17 and existing transmission infrastructure near the community of Mosca. It was originally constructed as three units to evaluate and demonstrate three types of photovoltaic (PV) technology at utility-scale, including: 1) fixed-tilt, seasonally-adjustable, flat-panel PV; 2) single-axis-tracking, flat-panel PV; and 3) dual-axis-tracking, concentrator photovoltaics (CPV). The first two units account for about 6.8 MW of the plant capacity and use 2,224 and 24,384 Suntech polycrystalline silicon panels, respectively. The third unit accounts for the remaining ~1.2 MW and consists of 72 SOLON Mover tracker systems with concentrating solar panels.

The plant was developed, financed, constructed, owned, and operated by SunEdison. Construction began in April 2007, and the facility was generating full power by the end of the year. It continued as the most productive public-utility-connected PV power plant until the end of 2008, when the El Dorado Solar Power Plant in Nevada came online. It provided enough power to supply 1400 homes that year. In January 2015, the plant was purchased by TerraForm Power, which was created as a yield co by SunEdison prior to its bankruptcy filing the following year.

The plant received some criticism upon startup, saying that the amount of land used is large in comparison to the amount of power generated.

== Electricity production ==
Generation (MW·h) of Alamosa PV Plant
Year	Jan	Feb	Mar	Apr	May	Jun	Jul	Aug	Sep	Oct	Nov	Dec	Total
2007												2,208	2,208
2008	348	735	1712	2106	2135	2625	1932	1815	1774	1285	664	400	17,531
2009	410	636	1717	1983	2266	1683	1958	2268	1885	1279	883	486	17,455
2010	233	484	1108	1421	1946	2299	1771	2221	2073	1382	1585	1085	17,608
2011	913	1136	1430	1842	2027	2173	1688	1910	1451	1433	966	828	17,797
2012	353	426	581	928	1859	2007	1951	1992	2092	2117	1740	1526	17,573
2013	998	1141	1415	1373	1693	1727	1650	1644	1520	1578	1083	1084	16,907
2014	1082	1224	1532	1428	1590	1780	1491	1816	1439	1362	1110	747	16,601
Average Annual Production (years 2008-2014) --->													17,353

Generation (MW·h) of Alamosa PV Plant post transfer
Year	Jan	Feb	Mar	Apr	May	Jun	Jul	Aug	Sep	Oct	Nov	Dec	Total
2015	127	181	256	252	234	270	217	251	233	186	185	245	2,638
2016	96	139	170	169	200	210	219	175	379	367	270	242	2,636
2017	1401	2182	3054	3371	3974	4306	3735	3126	2618	3101	1978	2031	34,876
2018	827	972	1257	1524	1756	1887	1645	1642	1578	1177	970	702	15,939
2019	807	850	1267	1491	1588	1786	1690	1721	1420	1396	868	633	15,517
Average Annual Production (years 2018-2019) --->													15,728

== See also ==
- Greater Sandhill Solar Plant
- Solar power in Colorado
- Solar power in the United States
- Renewable energy in the United States
- Renewable portfolio standard
