= Hooper Solar PV Power Plant =

Photovoltaic power station in the San Luis Valley

- Country: United States
- Location: San Luis Valley, Mosca, Colorado
- Coordinates: 37°41′32″N 105°58′54″W
- Status: Operational
- Construction began: early 2015
- Commission date: December 2015
- Owner: TotalEnergies
- Operator: SunPower

Solar farm
- Type: Flat-panel PV
- Site area: 320 acres (129 ha)

Power generation
- Nameplate capacity: 50 MW_{AC}
- Capacity factor: 27.9% (average 2016-2021)
- Annual net output: 122 GW·h, 382 MW·h/acre

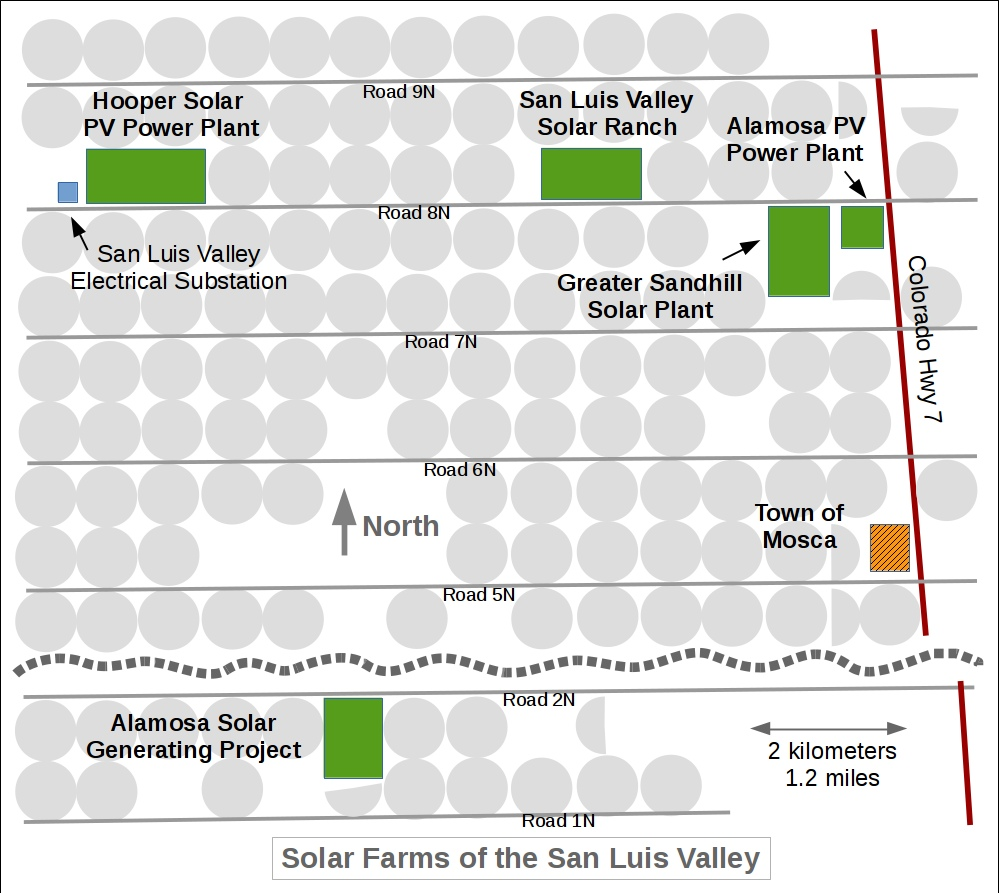
A map of solar farms in the San Luis valley

The Hooper Solar PV Power Plant is a 50 megawatt (MW_{AC}) photovoltaic power station in the San Luis Valley, located near the town of Mosca, Colorado. It was the largest solar facility in the state when it came online at the end of 2015. The electricity is being sold to Public Service of Colorado, a subsidiary of Xcel Energy, under a long-term power purchase agreement.

== Facility details ==
The facility occupies about 320 acres of previous agricultural farmland, and is located near several other large solar power plants in the sunny and cool San Luis Valley. It was developed and constructed by SunPower, and is owned by a subsidiary of the French company TotalEnergies which is also the majority owner of SunPower. The plant is built using SunPower's Oasis Power Plant System, which includes single-axis tracking, robotic panel cleaning, and real-time monitoring at the company's operations center.

Construction began in early 2015, and employed about 150 workers. Mortenson Construction completed the site preparation and installed the array support piles and other civil structures. Commercial operations began in December 2015 shortly after the delivery of first electricity to the grid.

The facility is sited adjacent to a San Luis Valley substation and has been planned to accommodate a future 100 MW expansion.

== Electricity production ==
Generation (MW·h) of Hooper Solar PV Power Plant
Year	Jan	Feb	Mar	Apr	May	Jun	Jul	Aug	Sep	Oct	Nov	Dec	Total
2015												5,224	5,224
2016	5,127	8,767	11,297	11,738	13,721	14,035	14,442	11,938	10,991	9,872	7,039	5,541	124,418
2017	5,036	7,845	10,976	12,115	14,283	15,479	13,426	11,235	9,411	11,145	7,110	7,299	125,358
2018	6,617	7,781	10,062	12,194	14,052	15,101	13,163	13,142	12,631	9,419	7,764	5,621	127,547
2019	6,417	6,762	10,073	11,858	12,624	14,200	13,441	13,682	11,294	11,102	6,900	5,029	123,382
2020	6,869	7,236	11,086	12,389	14,386	13,947	14,455	11,781	11,482	8,651	7,455	5,633	125,372
2021	5,692	6,281	8,028	9,748	9,604	11,941	12,859	12,206	10,455	8,092	6,044	5,415	106,355
Average Annual Production (years 2016–2021) --->													122,072

== See also ==
- San Luis Valley Solar Ranch
- Solar power in Colorado
- Solar power in the United States
- Renewable energy in the United States
- Renewable portfolio standard
