= Mosca, Colorado =

Unincorporated community in Alamosa County, CO, USA

- Unincorporated community
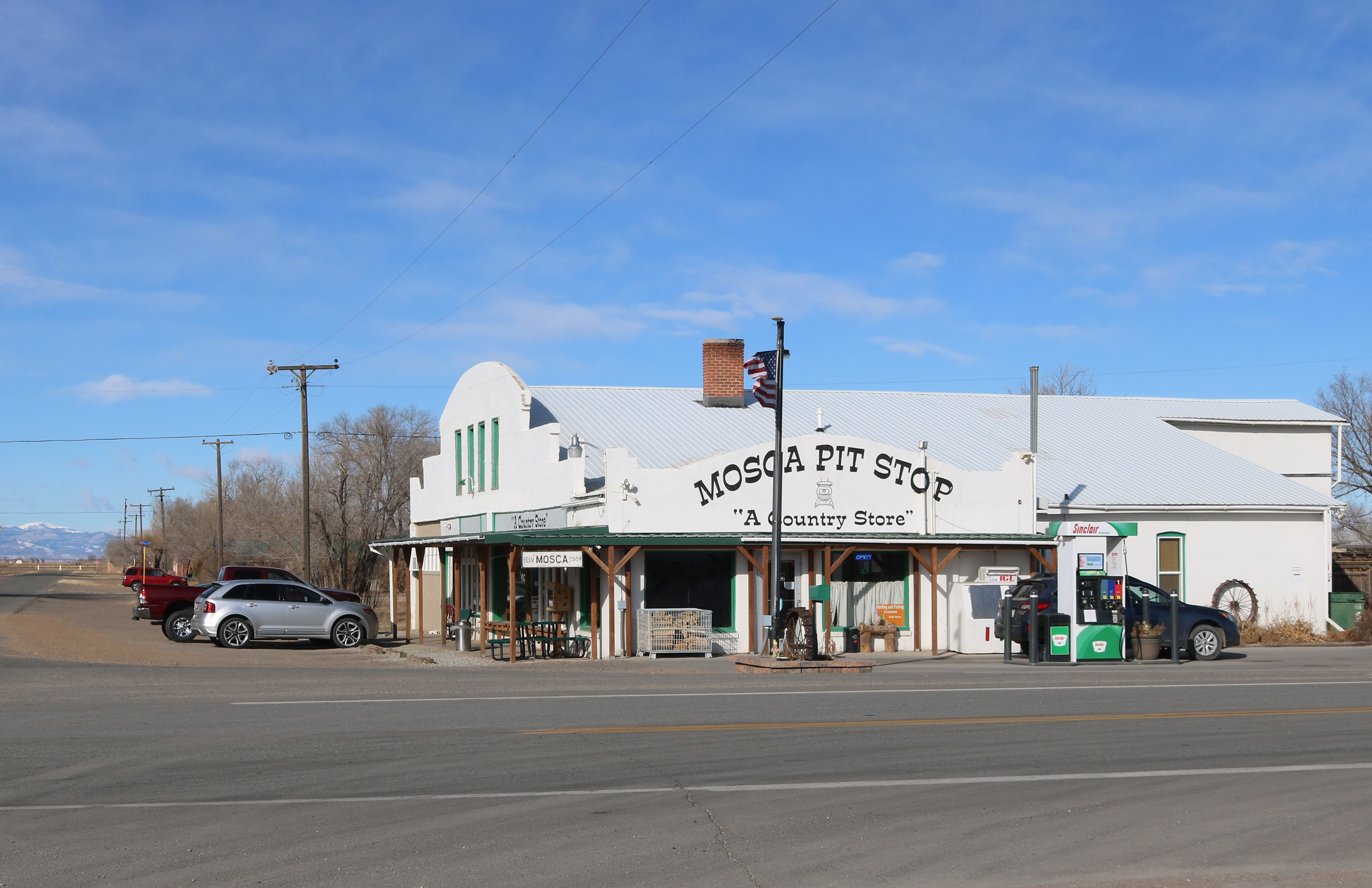
- Mosca and State Highway 17

- Location within the state of Colorado Location in Alamosa County and the state of Colorado Mosca, Colorado (the United States)
- Coordinates: 37°38′53″N 105°52′30″W
- Country: United States
- State: Colorado
- County: Alamosa
- Elevation: 7,559 ft (2,304 m)

Population (2020)
  - Total: 1,072
- Time zone: UTC-7 (MST)
  - Summer (DST): UTC-6 (MDT)
- ZIP code: 81146
- GNIS feature ID: 196391

Mosca (Spanish for fly) is an unincorporated community and a U.S. Post Office in Alamosa County, Colorado, United States. Mosca's population is 1,072 as of the 2020 census. It was named for the nearby Mosca Pass, which was named for the Spanish explorer, Luis de Moscoso Alvarado. The Mosca Post Office has the ZIP Code 81146. It is best known for its proximity to Great Sand Dunes National Park and Preserve.

== Climate ==
The climate in this area is characterized by warm to hot, dry summers, and cold to freezing winters. According to the Köppen Climate Classification system, Mosca has a semi-arid climate, abbreviated "BSk" on climate maps.

== Nearby attractions ==
- Great Sand Dunes National Park and Preserve (including the Superintendent's Residence and Indian Grove)
- Colorado Gators Reptile Park
- UFO Watchtower
- Trujillo Homesteads

== Power Plants ==
- San Luis Valley Solar Ranch
- Hooper Solar PV Power Plant
- Greater Sandhill Solar Plant
- Alamosa Solar Generating Project
- Alamosa Photovoltaic Power Plant

== Economy ==
Much of the local economy is based on tourism due to the town's proximity with Great Sand Dunes National Park. FairPoint Communications operated the Columbine Telecom Company in the community.

== Education ==
Mosca is served by the Sangre de Cristo School District Re-22J. It is home to Sangre de Cristo Elementary School and Sangre de Cristo Undivided High School.
