= NYNEX =

Former American telecommunications company

NYNEX Corporation
- Type: Public
- Traded as: NYSE: NYN
- Industry: Telecommunication
- Predecessor: AT&T Corporation
- Founded: January 1, 1984; 42 years ago
- Defunct: August 14, 1997; 29 years ago
- Fate: Merged with Bell Atlantic
- Successor: Bell Atlantic
- Headquarters: New York City, United States
- Products: Local telephone service Cellular telephone service
- Subsidiaries: Verizon New England; Verizon New York

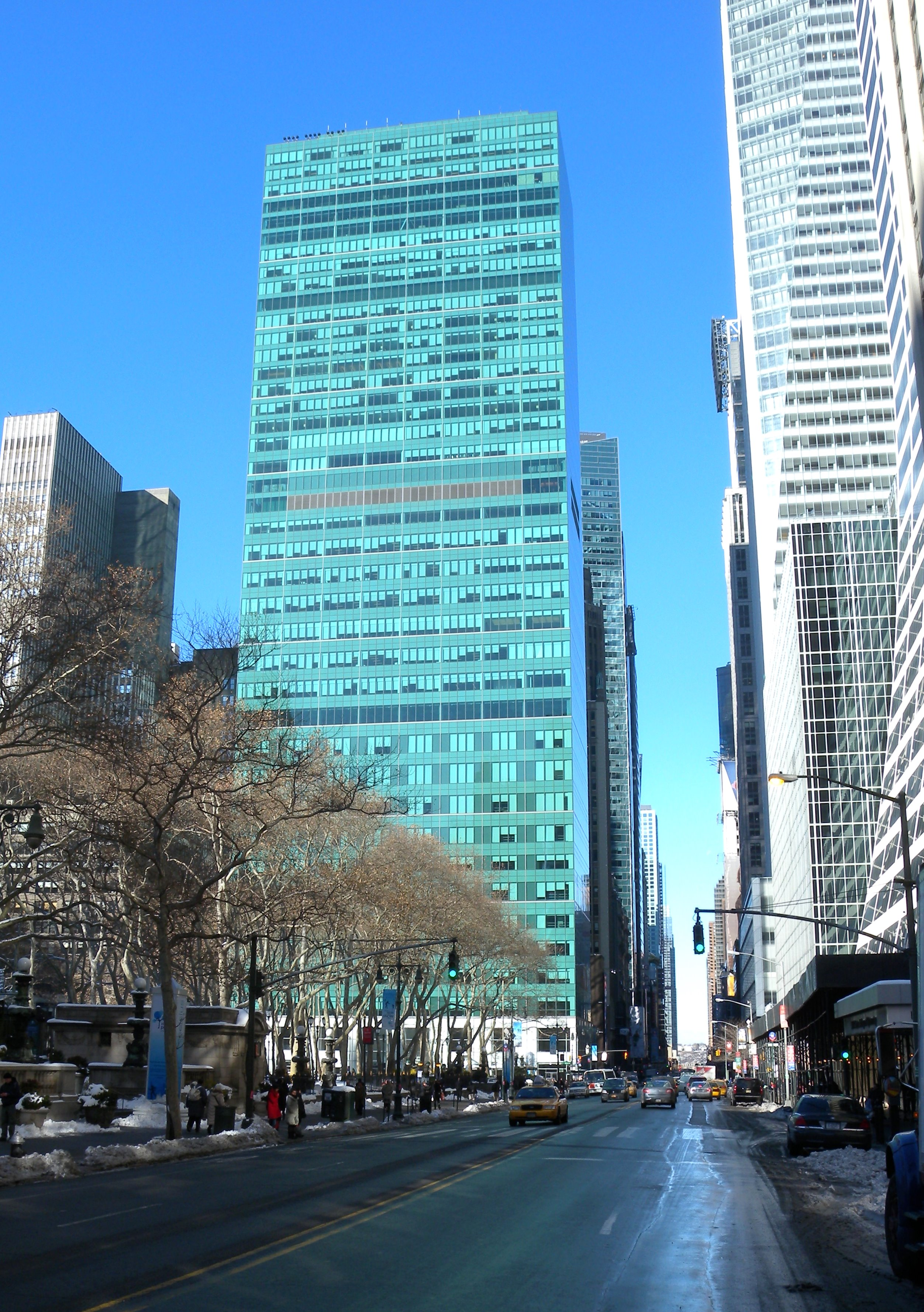
Corporate HQ, 1095 Avenue of the Americas

NYNEX Corporation (/ˈnaɪnɛks/) was an American telephone company that served five states of New England (Maine, Massachusetts, New Hampshire, Rhode Island and Vermont) as well as most of the state of New York from January 1, 1984, to August 14, 1997.

== History ==
Formed on January 1, 1984, as the result of the breakup of the Bell System, NYNEX was a Regional Bell Operating Company which was made up of former subsidiaries of AT&T, these being New York Telephone and New England Telephone. The name NYNEX was an acronym derived from New York and New England, representing the company's two primary service areas. According to the company's chairman, the letter "X" symbolized the "unknown and exciting future of the burgeoning information market." However, in subsequent legal proceedings and general public reference, the "X" became commonly understood to represent "EXchange." Delbert C. Staley, chairman of the New York Telephone Company, was named as the new company's first chairman before NYNEX officially went into business. He was replaced by William C. Ferguson, president and chief operating officer of the New York Telephone Company, when the new company launched.

In April 1986, NYNEX purchased all 84 IBM Product Centers and relaunched them, along with its 19 Datago stores, as NYNEX Business Centers.

In June 1988, NYNEX acquired AGS Computers Inc., a professional services and software provider. AGS was then run as an independent subsidiary. NYNEX expanded into commercial real estate with its NYNEX Properties Company subsidiary. By July 1988, NYNEX owned buildings in Westchester County and Woodcliff Lake, New Jersey, with plans to lease space to outside tenants.

In August 1989, 200,000 telephone workers in 20 states went on strike against NYNEX, Pacific Telesis, Bell Atlantic, and Ameritech. While most of the walkouts were eventually settled, NYNEX did not agree to a new contract until November. During the 100-day strike, workers were accused of vandalism, one picketer died, and landline installations were delayed for months.

In February 1990, the FCC ordered the company to pay $1.4 million in fines and refund $35 million to consumers for an illegal scheme to funnel profits to NYNEX Material Enterprises by overcharging regulated companies for basic supplies and awarding bloated contracts to vendors who attended company parties. NYNEX dismissed two executives and disciplined several other employees of the subsidiary in the summer of 1988.

By 1993, NYNEX had decided to leave the information services business, selling AGS to Keane in November. The sale included AGS Information Services, Atkinson Tremblay & Associates Inc., AGS Federal Systems Inc. and AGS Management Systems Inc., but not Disc Inc. and Stockholder Systems Inc., or NYNEX DPI. During this time, the company also sold the London-based BIS Group and Systems Strategies Inc.

In 1994, NYNEX pledged to cut 16,800 employees, or 22 percent of its payroll, by the end of 1996. It planned to work with the Communications Workers of America and the International Brotherhood of Electrical Workers to find solutions that avoided sweeping layoffs. This continued a previous trend, where the company cut 13,000 jobs over the previous four years through voluntary departures. In February 1994, vice chairman Ivan Seidenberg was named as the company's new president and chief operating officer. In November, he was named chairman and chief executive. NYNEX DPI was sold to IBM in September 1994. Amidst a flurry of legal challenges brought by various regional Bell companies against regulators that year, it was ruled that NYNEX would be permitted to offer television programming over its local networks.

In May 1995, New York State agreed to deregulate NYNEX's pricing structure in order to allow the company to offer more competitive pricing. As part of the deal, NYNEX agreed to cut $375 million in its residential and business phone rates in New York by 1999.

=== International assets ===
Looking to expand into international markets by the 1990s, NYNEX set up operations in Belgium, Gibraltar, the Philippines, and the United Kingdom. In March 1993, NYNEX Cablecomms of Britain purchased Pactel Cable U.K. Ltd from Pacific Telesis.

NYNEX also operated cable television and telephone services in the United Kingdom with offices in Waterlooville (Hampshire), Baguley (Manchester), Shoreham-by-Sea (West Sussex), Leatherhead (Surrey) and Antrim (Northern Ireland). In the mid-1990s, the company held the naming rights to the Manchester Arena, then known as the "NYNEX Arena". NYNEX Cablecomms announced its initial public offering in June 1995. In 1996, NYNEX's UK assets were merged with the subsidiary of Cable & Wireless, Mercury Communications, as well as cable operators Vidéotron and Bell Cablemedia, and the new business was subsequently renamed Cable & Wireless Communications. Cable & Wireless' cable assets were sold to NTL in July 1999. The acquisition was completed in May 2000. NTL then merged with Telewest in March 2006 to form NTL:Telewest, and was later rebranded on February 8, 2007 as Virgin Media.

=== Merger with Bell Atlantic ===
In April 1996, after two years of negotiations, NYNEX and Bell Atlantic announced its intentions to merge. Under the terms of the deal, Raymond W. Smith would remain chairman and chief executive officer of Bell Atlantic and Seidenberg would serve as vice chairman, president, and chief operating officer. After one year, Seidenberg would become chief executive officer of the new company, and chairman upon Smith's retirement. In an effort to avoid a Congressional vote on the merger, the transaction was turned into an acquisition of NYNEX by Bell Atlantic in June.

The final merger took place on August 14, 1997, in what was at the time the second-largest merger in corporate history in America. Although the surviving company was Bell Atlantic, the merged company moved from the headquarters of Bell Atlantic in Philadelphia to the headquarters of NYNEX in New York City. In the time leading up to, and immediately after the merger, there was reported to be a mass exodus of top NYNEX executives as Bell Atlantic took more control.

In September, the new Bell Atlantic rolled out a marketing campaign to inform existing NYNEX customers about the change in the company's name. In April 2000, Bell Atlantic announced it would acquire GTE and form Verizon Communications; the deal closed on June 30.

== Criticism ==
Throughout its existence, NYNEX struggled with service quality. The dense and shifting population of New York City, high demand for fax and internet lines, hard-to-reach physical environments in places like Brooklyn, and frequent theft of copper wires were all identified as factors attributing to service issues. However, NYNEX was also guilty of letting its network deteriorate in some areas and cutting thousands of jobs that left the company unable to meet rising demand. Of the seven regional Bell companies, the FCC ranked it last in customer satisfaction in 1993.

In the fourth quarter of 1994 alone, NYNEX's New York City customers reported 99,145 service outages, while repair teams missed 61,500 appointments. According to the New York State Public Service Commission that represented a 30% rise over 1993 in missed repair appointments, a 40% rise in the number of lines reported out of service for more than 24 hours and a whopping 107% rise in complaints. In 1995, the state of New York proposed a new turnaround plan intended to help NYNEX improve its customer service. However, there were concerns that it would not work and that the rate reductions proposed by the plan would be too inconsistent.

The state of New York impounded $4.1 million of regulated fees collected by NYNEX in August 1996 for failing to meet specific service metrics that had been set by the public utility commission in its order setting service rates. The Public Service Commission imposed $62.3 million in fines on NYNEX in November after it missed customer service benchmarks.

== See also ==
- Western Electric
- FairPoint Communications
- William C. Ferguson
- NYNEX Arena (Manchester, United Kingdom)
