= Trujillo Homesteads =

Historic district in Colorado, United States

- U.S. National Register of Historic Places
- U.S. National Historic Landmark District
- Colorado State Register of Historic Properties
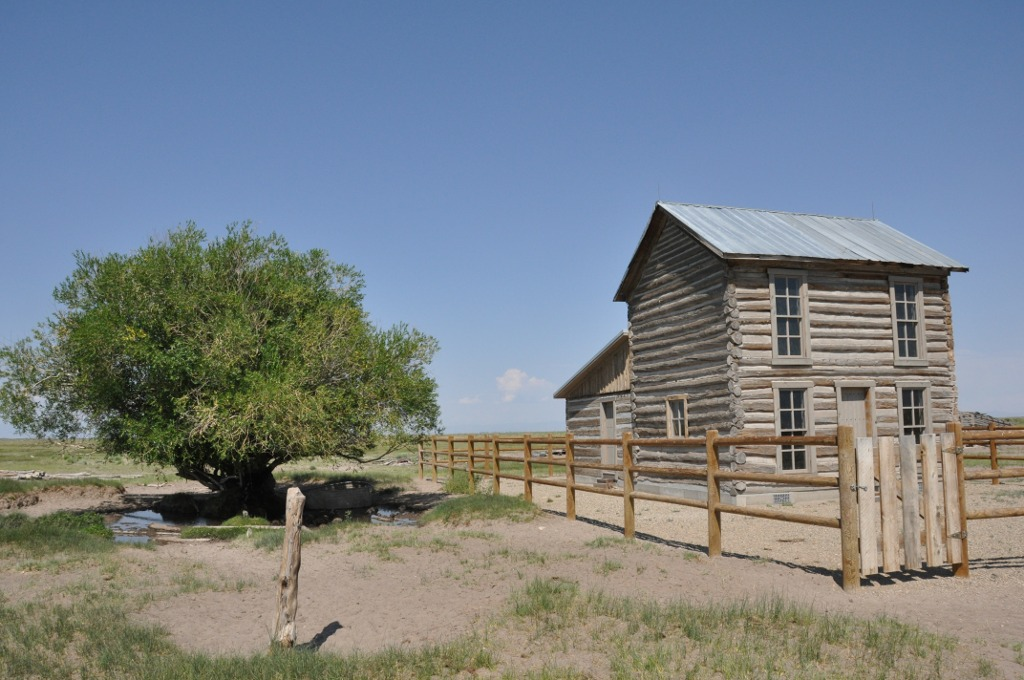

- Location within Colorado Location within the United States
- Location: Mosca, Colorado
- Coordinates: 37°43′59.88″N 105°44′8.88″W
- Area: 11.2 acres (4.5 ha)
- Built: 1879
- NRHP reference No.: 03001544
- CSRHP No.: 5AL.706

Significant dates
- Added to NRHP: February 4, 2004
- Designated NHLD: February 1, 2012

The Trujillo Homesteads are a historic ranch site near Mosca, Alamosa County, Colorado, not far from the Great Sand Dunes National Park. The area was first settled in the 1860s by Teofilo Trujillo, a Mexican sheep farmer. His son Pedro built a log cabin house beginning in 1879, along with other ranch outbuildings and structures. In 1902 the elder Trujillo's home was destroyed by fire during conflicts between English-speaking cattle ranchers and the Spanish Trujillos, who were by then major landowners in the area. The Trujillos sold their holdings, which became part the Medeno Zapata Ranch, now owned by The Nature Conservancy. The homestead area, including the surviving homestead and the ruins of the destroyed one, was declared a National Historic Landmark District in February 2012.

The homestead site covers about 11 acres (4.5 ha) in a remote rural setting northeast of Mosca. The site includes the archaeological site where Pedro Trujillo built his log cabin, the surviving ranch house (built 1879-1885), and a corral area dating to the Trujillo's ownership period. The ranch house is a two-story rectangular log structure, covered by a modern metal roof. The walls consist mainly of unhewn logs, joined at the corners with V notches. Daubing fills the gaps between the logs. The main facade faces east, and is three bays wide, with sash windows in the outer bays, and a simple wooden doorway at the center. A shed-roof leanto ell extends to the rear of the main block. The house is particularly unusual, in that Spanish settlers to the region more often built with adobe rather than wood.

== See also ==
- Homestead Acts
- List of National Historic Landmarks in Colorado
- National Register of Historic Places listings in Alamosa County, Colorado
