= Verizon New England =

Bell Operating Company in the Northeast US

Verizon New England, Inc.
- Trade name: Verizon Massachusetts; Verizon Rhode Island
- Formerly: New England Telephone and Telegraph Company (1883–2000)
- Type: Subsidiary
- Industry: Telecommunications
- Founded: 1883
- Headquarters: Boston, Massachusetts, US
- Area served: Massachusetts, Rhode Island
- Key people: Donna Cupelo (Region President); Jay Rooney (Director of Central Office Operations)
- Products: POTS, DSL, FiOS (FTTP)
- Parent: American Bell (1883–1899); AT&T (1899–1983); NYNEX (1984–1997); Bell Atlantic (1997–2000); Verizon (2000–present)

Verizon New England, Inc., is a Bell Operating Company that once covered most of New England but now only serves most of Massachusetts and all of Rhode Island. It was formerly the New England Telephone and Telegraph Company, more commonly known as New England Telephone, which for seven decades served most of the New England area of the United States as a part of the original AT&T. New England Telephone's original coverage area included Maine, New Hampshire, and Vermont as well as Massachusetts and Rhode Island, Verizon has sold off service in the northern three states, which as of 2020 were served by Consolidated Communications.

After the Bell System divestiture from AT&T, New England Telephone merged with New York Telephone to form NYNEX in 1984. NYNEX was acquired by Bell Atlantic in 1997. In 2000, Bell Atlantic bought GTE and changed its own name to Verizon. New England Telephone was then renamed Verizon New England.

== History ==
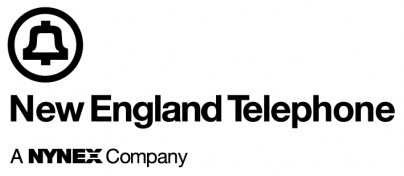
New England Telephone logo during its time as part of NYNEX, 1984–1992

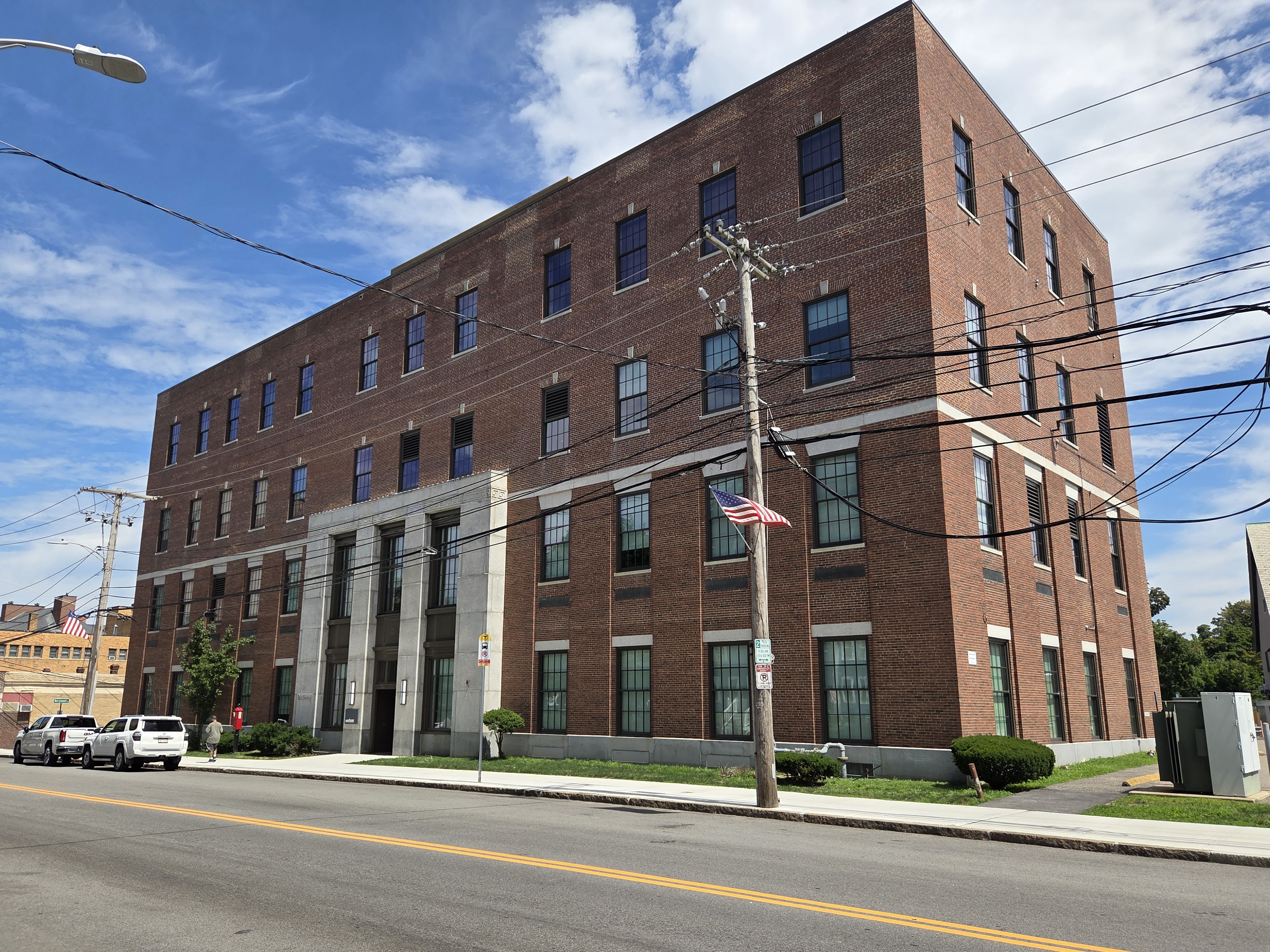
The Quincy office building in 2026

New England Telephone & Telegraph Company (N.E.T.&T. Co.) was incorporated in the state of New York in 1883 by consolidation of The Bay State Telephone Co., The Boston & Northern Telephone Co., The Granite State Telephone Co., The National Bell Telephone Company of Maine, Suburban Telephone Co., Pioneer Telephone Co., Chesire Telephone Co., and The Telephone Despatch Company of Boston. It gained a controlling interest in smaller regional companies in New England, including the Southern Massachusetts telephone Co. (1899) and Providence Telephone Co. (1912). The smaller companies were subsequently absorbed by N.E.T.&T.

The company has no connection to an earlier New England Telephone and Telegraph Company, a short-lived company that dissolved in 1879. It also had no connection to Southern New England Telephone (SNET) which covered Connecticut.

NYNEX was acquired by Bell Atlantic in 1997 and began doing business under that name; however, New England Telephone retained its original corporate name. In 2000, Bell Atlantic bought GTE and changed its own name to Verizon. New England Telephone was then renamed Verizon New England, Inc.

On April 1, 2008, Verizon's operations in Maine, New Hampshire, and Vermont were sold to FairPoint Communications as Northern New England Telephone Operations and Telephone Operating Company of Vermont. In 2017, FairPoint sold them to Consolidated Communications.

Workers of Verizon New England are represented by the IBEW 2222 labor union.

Verizon New England is headquartered at 6 Bowdoin Square in downtown Boston, with regional headquarters at 1070 Hancock Street in Quincy, Massachusetts.

Verizon New England is regulated the oversight of the Massachusetts Department of Telecommunications and Cable and the Rhode Island Public Utilities Commission.

== See also ==
- List of wired multiple-system broadband providers in Massachusetts (by municipality)
