= Sacred Heart Catholic Church (Alamosa, Colorado) =

Historic church in Colorado, United States

- U.S. National Register of Historic Places
- Colorado State Register of Historic Properties
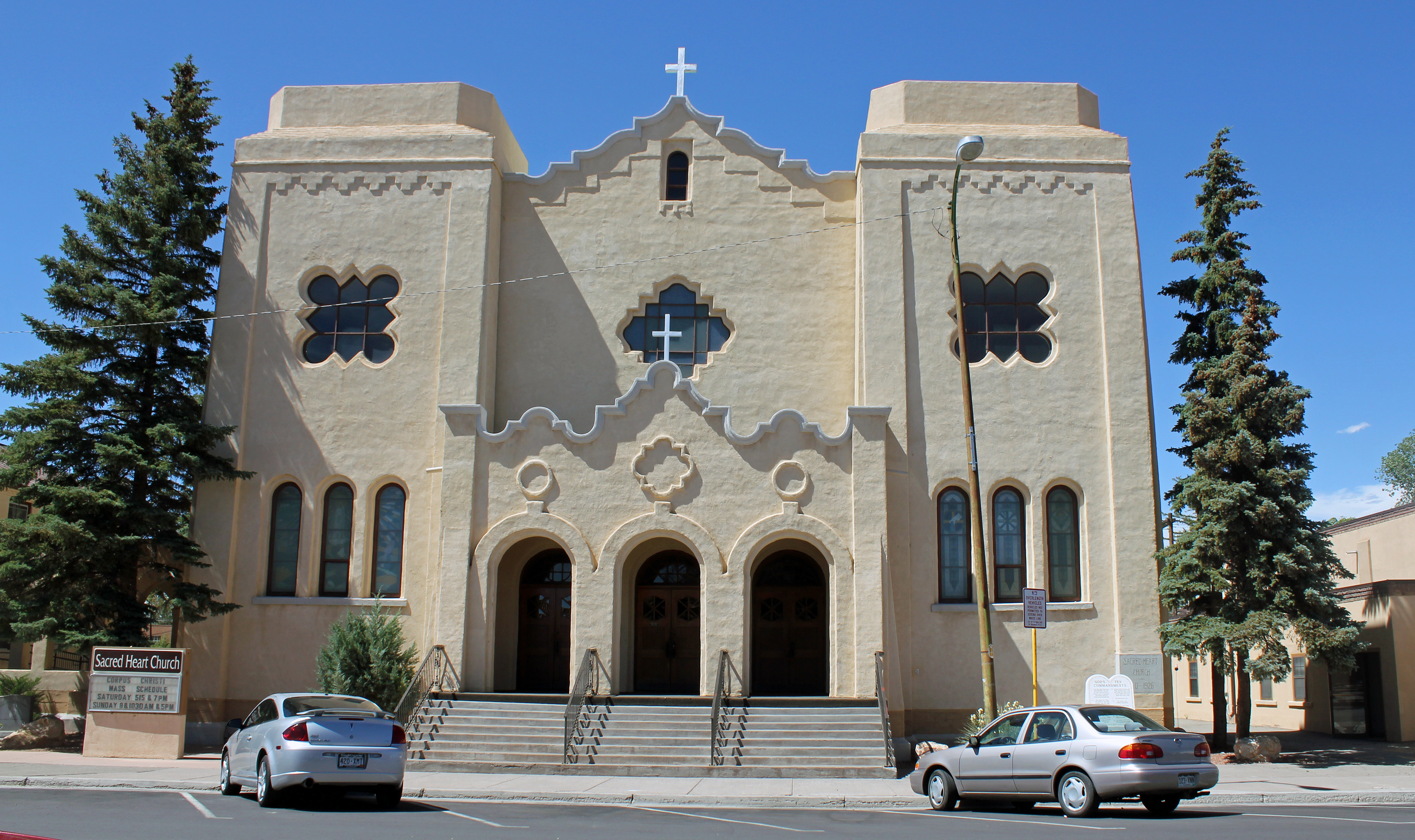

- Location within Colorado Location within the United States
- Location: 727 4th St., Alamosa, Colorado
- Coordinates: 37°28′11″N 105°52′04″W
- Area: less than one acre
- Built: 1922
- Architect: Willison, Robert; Monroe, John K.
- Architectural style: Mission Revival/Spanish Revival
- NRHP reference No.: 98000855
- CSRHP No.: 5AL.262
- Added to NRHP: July 15, 1998

Sacred Heart Catholic Church is a historic church at 727 4th Street in Alamosa, Colorado. It was built in 1922 in a Mission Revival/Spanish Revival style and was added to the National Register in 1998.

Its construction began in 1922. It is 78 by 138 feet (24 m × 42 m) in plan.

It was planned for its two towers to rise to four-stories tall, but these were never finished.

The listing included two contributing buildings and a contributing structure: besides the church, an arcade and a rectory were built.
