= Indian Grove (Mosca, Colorado) =

Archaeological site in Colorado, United States

Coordinates: 37.7882°N 105.5097°W

- U.S. National Register of Historic Places
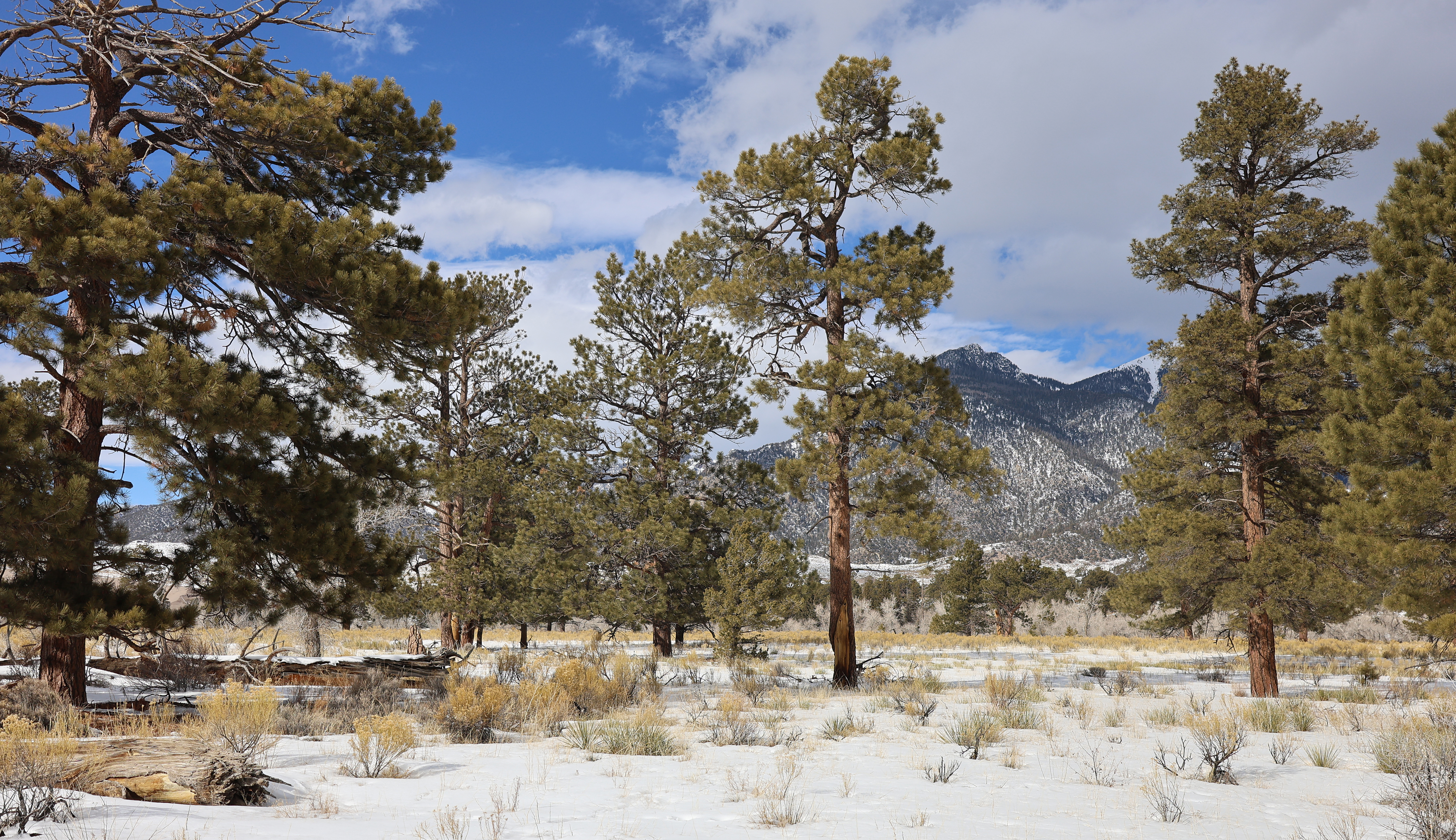
- Some of the trees in the grove in 2024

- Location within Colorado Location within the United States
- Nearest city: Mosca, Colorado
- Area: 38.4 acres (15.5 ha)
- NRHP reference No.: 00000237
- Added to NRHP: March 24, 2000

Indian Grove is an archaeological site consisting of a grove of 72 mature Ponderosa Pine trees located within Great Sand Dunes National Park & Preserve in Saguache County, Colorado, near Mosca, Colorado. The grove is of interest because sections of the bark of some of the trees was peeled off in the early 19th century, probably by Utes.

Indian Grove Back-Country Campsite, located within the grove, is one of six back-country campsites on the Sand Ramp Trail, a hiking trail that skirts the dune field on the east and north giving access to the northern portion of the National Park and Preserve along Sand Creek. The camp site has a solar-composting toilet.
