= Pacific Telemanagement Services =

American payphone service provider

- Type: Private
- Industry: Telecommunications
- Founded: 1986 in San Ramon, California
- Headquarters: San Ramon, Calif., US
- Area served: 90 countries
- Brands: Pacific Telemanagement Services, PTS
- Services: Advertising, Telecommunications, VoIP
- Website: www.ptsproviders.com

Jaroth, Inc. d/b/a Pacific Telemanagement Services is a nationwide operator of payphones in the United States based in San Ramon, California. It was founded in 1986 and has taken over many pay telephone operations that major telephone companies have abandoned.

Many AT&T payphones were sold to PTS in 2008.

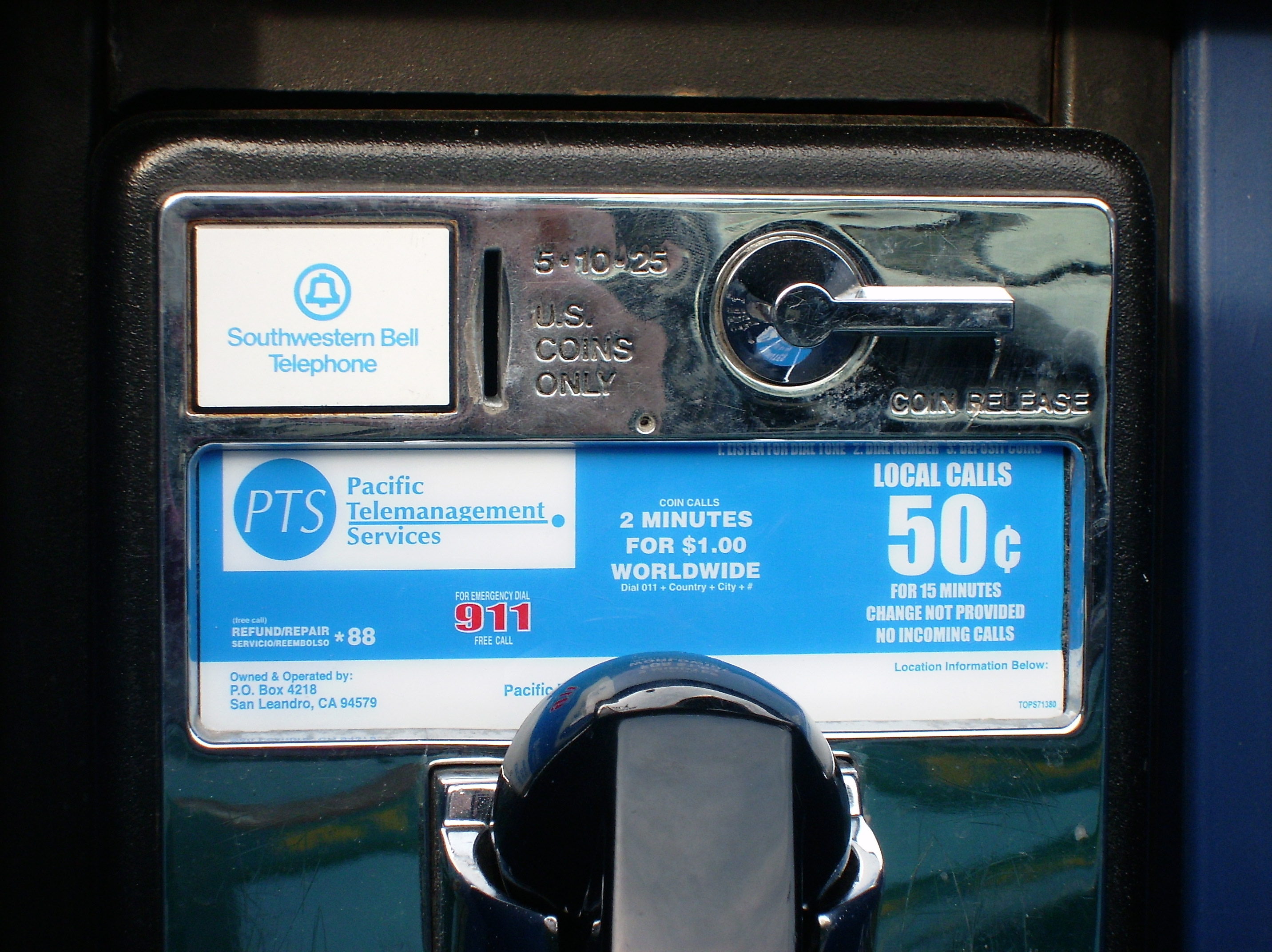
A former AT&T payphone in Kansas City, Kansas that changed hands to PTS.

PTS purchased most of the payphone operations of Verizon in October 2011.

FairPoint Communications announced it would sell its payphone business to PTS on May 22, 2012. The sale makes Frontier Communications as one of the last major telecommunications providers continuing to operate payphones. Pacific Telemanagement Services operates approximately 25,000 payphones across the US.

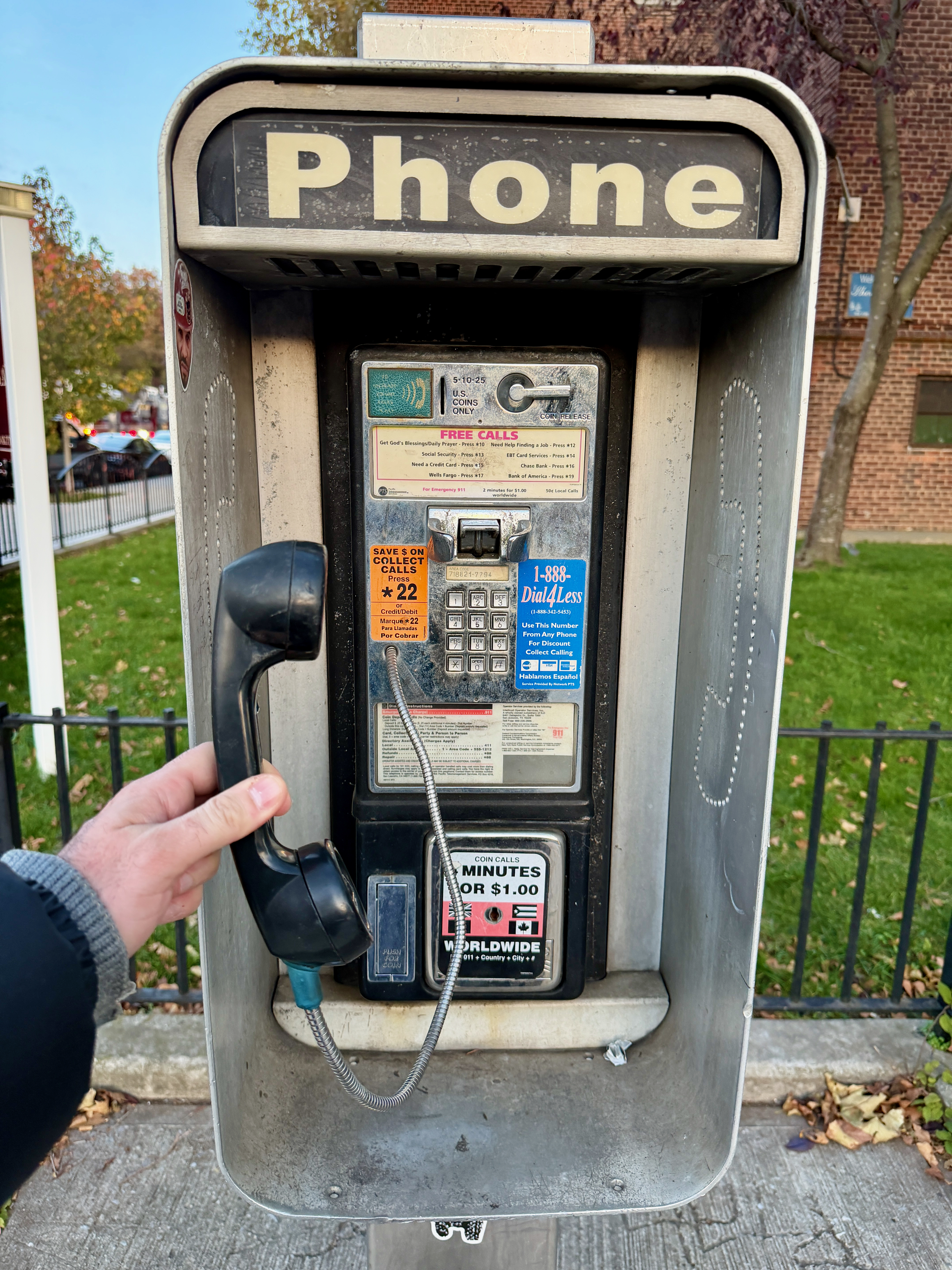
A PTS operated payphone in New York City - 718/821-7794

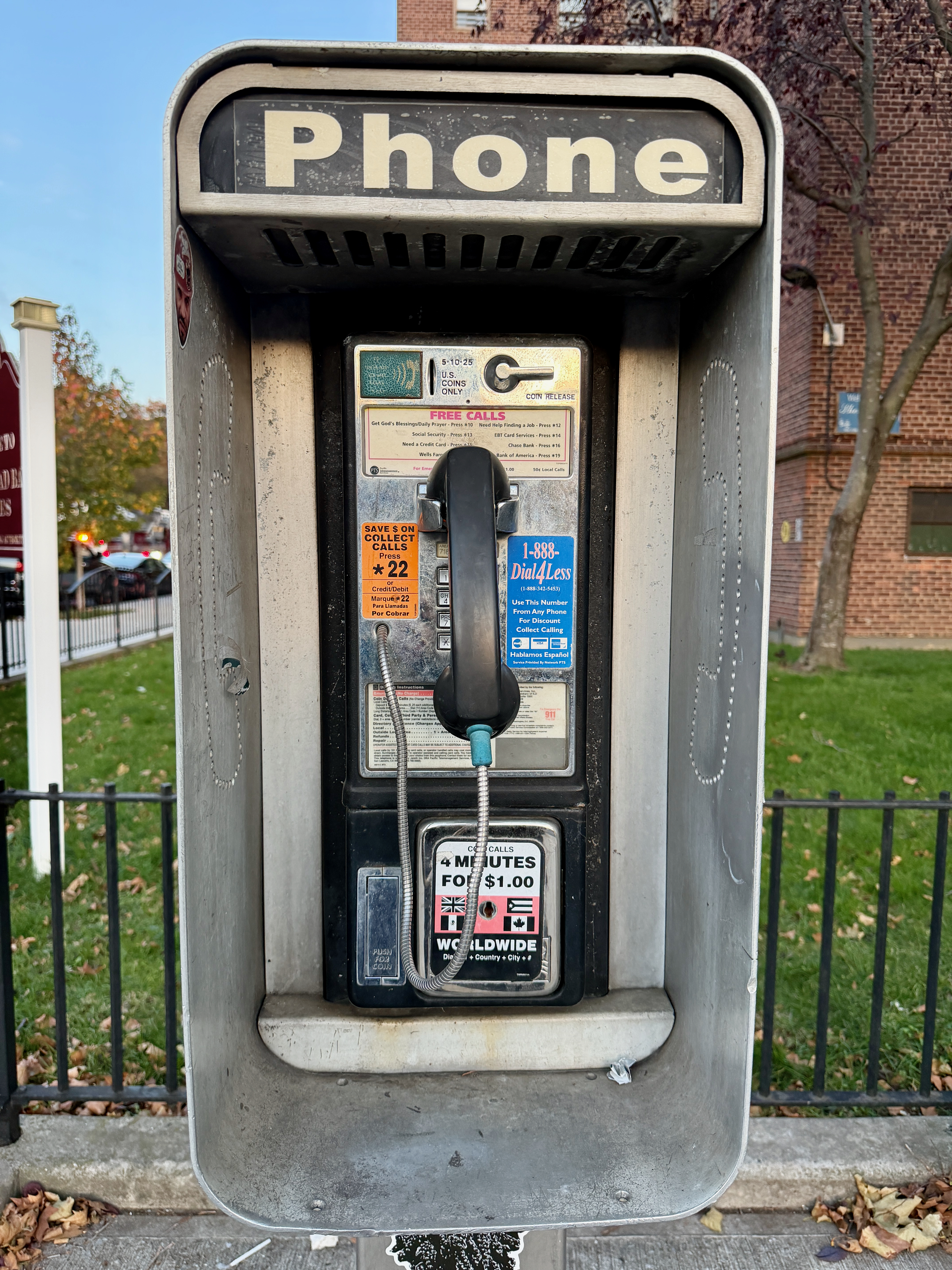
Payphone in NYC
