= Husung Hardware =

Building in Alamosa Street, Alamosa, Colorado, United States

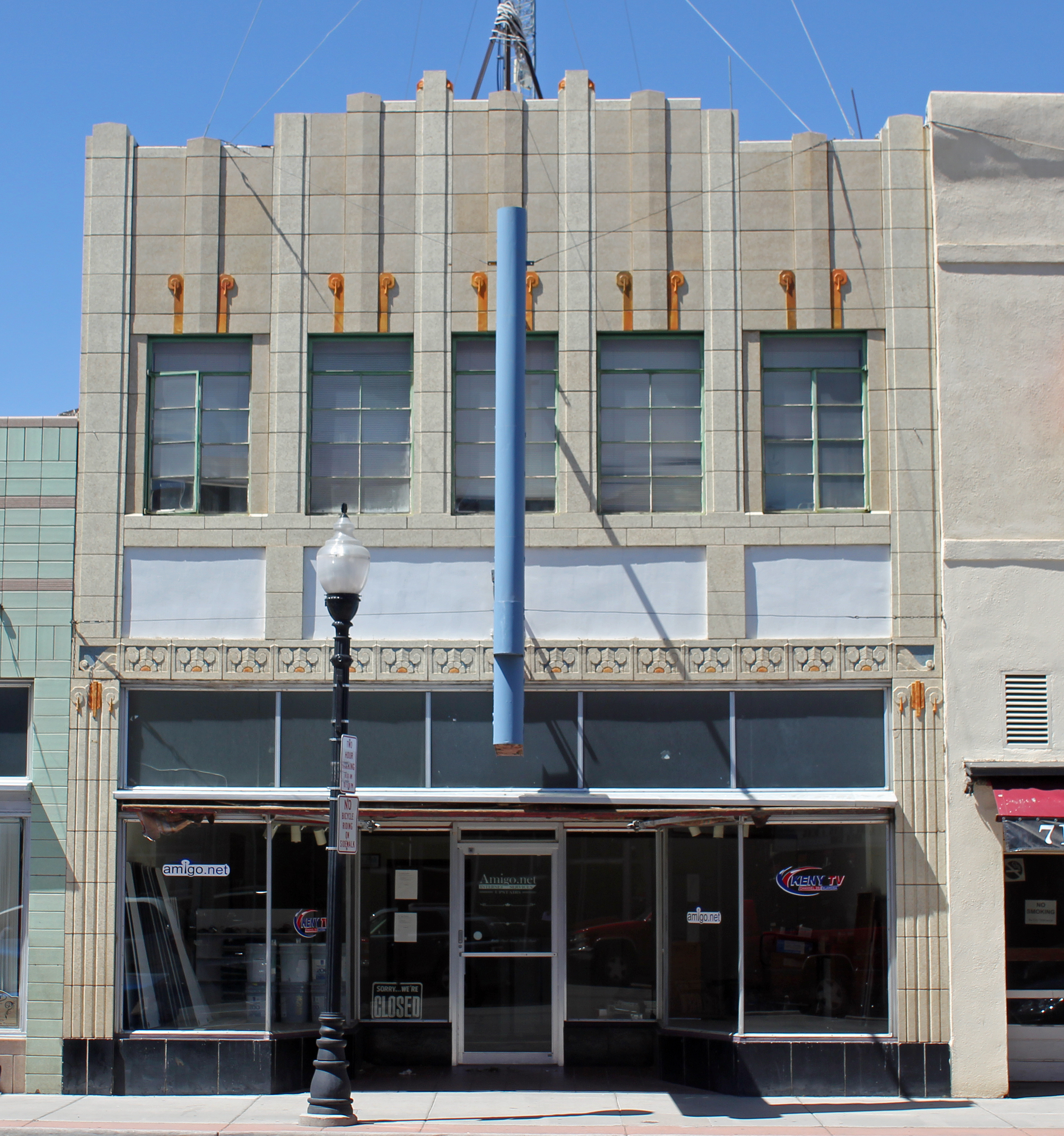

General information
- Location: 625 Main St., Alamosa, Alamosa Street, United States
- Opened: 1936
- Awards and prizes: National Register of Historic Places

Husung Hardware is a building that was constructed in 1936 in Alamosa, Colorado with a terracotta facade and stylized ornamentation. The two-story brick building possesses the distinctive characteristics of Art Deco, a style not well represented in Alamosa County or in other small towns across the state. The well-preserved building is considered to be one of the best small town expressions of Art Deco in the state. On January 28, 2000, it was listed on the National Register of Historic Places.
