= FairPoint Communications =

Defunct American telecommunications company

FairPoint Communications, Inc.
- Type: Subsidiary
- Traded as: Nasdaq: FRP
- Industry: Communications Services
- Founded: 1991; 35 years ago
- Headquarters: Charlotte, North Carolina, U.S.
- Key people: Paul H Sunu (CEO); Rose Hauser (executive vice president and Chief Information Officer)
- Products: Internet services, Local wireline, Cable television
- Revenue: $1,274.62 million
- Net income: −$68.53 million
- Number of employees: 3,300
- Parent: Consolidated Communications
- Website: fairpoint.com at the Wayback Machine (archived 2015-03-15)

FairPoint Communications, Inc. was an American operator of communication services. FairPoint's services include local and long-distance phone service, data, Internet, broadband, television, business communications solutions and fiber services. Headquartered in Charlotte, North Carolina, it served 31 markets in 17 states, mostly in rural areas. FairPoint, along with Frontier Communications, had been at the forefront of acquiring Verizon landline operations.

== History ==
FairPoint was founded as MJD Communications Inc. in 1991, and was established as an incumbent local exchange carrier (ILEC) which gave it certain rights and obligations regarding providing service to rural areas.

The company acquired the Cass County Telephone Company in 2006, integrating its operations into FairPoint Communications Missouri. It also acquired the Germantown Independent Telephone Company in Germantown, Ohio.

=== Northern New England expansion ===
In 2007, FairPoint had about 330,000 access points or customers. In that year, Verizon Communications announced plans to sell its landline operations in Maine, New Hampshire, and Vermont to FairPoint for $2.7 billion. Of that amount, $1.7 billion would go to Verizon in cash and debt and approximately $1.015 billion would go to Verizon shareholders in FairPoint common stock. Verizon would hold no stock.

After extensive federal and state regulatory review and approval, the purchase became effective March 31, 2008, for a price of $2.4 billion. State regulators sought a lower figure out of concerns that excess debt would hamper service and expansion.

Approximately 1.6 million phone customers and 230,000 internet users in the three states were added to FairPoint's customer base, with the result that the Northern New England customers represented 85% of FairPoint's customers.

This increase made FairPoint Communications the 8th largest phone company in the United States.

=== Bankruptcy ===
On May 5, 2009, FairPoint indicated in its 2009 first quarter report that it was "considering engaging a financial advisor to evaluate its current capital structure and to explore options with respect to a potential restructuring." It also acknowledged that it was "at risk of failing to comply with the interest coverage covenant contained in its credit facility as early as the covenant measurement period ending June 30, 2009."

On October 26, 2009, FairPoint Communications filed for Chapter 11 bankruptcy protection.

The company emerged from bankruptcy in January 2011.

Verizon later lost its remaining money it made on the sale.

==== Payphone sale ====
FairPoint payphone in Randolph, Vermont in 2012

On May 22, 2012, FairPoint announced that it would sell its pay telephone operations to Pacific Telemanagement Services. The deal includes its 4,000 payphones operated through Northern New England Telephone Operations and Telephone Operating Company of Vermont. Fairpoint announced that the phones have become unprofitable at about $1 million in revenue.

=== 2014 Northern New England strike ===
FairPoint employees voted to strike on October 7, 2014, three days after FairPoint froze employee pensions. The strike was the year's longest work stoppage. Leaders of the International Brotherhood of Electrical Workers (IBEW) and the Communications Workers of America (CWA) said that FairPoint management had abandoned the bargaining process on August 27 after refusing to compromise on any substantive issue since negotiations began.

After 131 days, the strike ended with a new three-year contract in place.

=== Purchase by Consolidated Communications ===
In December 2016 FairPoint was purchased by Consolidated Communications for $1.5 billion including assumption of debt. The acquisition closed in July 2017. The combined company operates under the Consolidated Communications name.

== Local operating companies ==
FairPoint owned the following operating companies:

- Big Sandy Telecom – Simla, Colorado
- Columbine Telecom Company – Crestone and Mosca, Colorado
- FairPoint Communications Missouri
- GTCOM, Inc.
- Northern New England Telephone Operations (formerly part of Verizon New England)
- Sunflower Telephone Company – Kansas, Colorado
- Telephone Operating Company of Vermont (formerly part of Verizon New England)

=== Former operating companies ===
- Fremont Telcom Co. – Fremont County, Idaho (sold in 2013) (formerly part of U S WEST Communications)

== See also ==
- List of United States telephone companies
