= Superintendent's Residence, Great Sand Dunes National Monument =

Historic house in Colorado, United States

- U.S. National Register of Historic Places
- Colorado State Register of Historic Properties
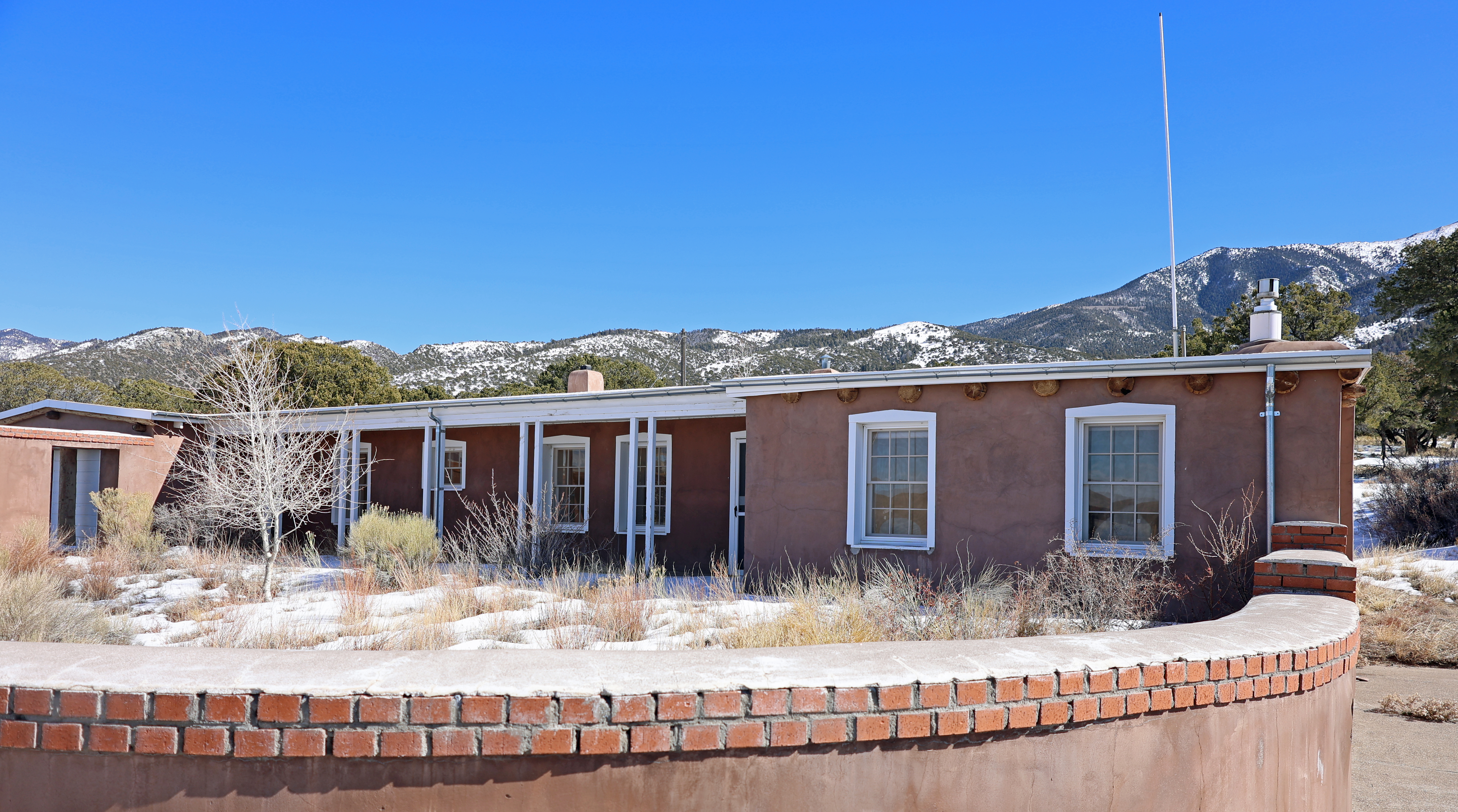
- The property in 2024

- Location within Colorado Location within the United States
- Nearest city: Mosca, Colorado
- Coordinates: 37°43′30″N 105°31′5″W
- Built: 1940
- Architect: Kenneth Saunders
- NRHP reference No.: 89001761
- CSRHP No.: 5AL.414
- Added to NRHP: November 2, 1989

The Superintendent's Residence at Great Sand Dunes National Monument was designed in 1940 by Kenneth R. Saunders and Jerome C. Miller of the National Park Service Branch of Plans and Designs. Built the same year by the Works Progress Administration, the house is in the Territorial Revival style, deemed a suitable local adaptation of the National Park Service Rustic style. The national monument is now Great Sand Dunes National Park and Preserve. The building is located adjacent to the entrance gate house of the park.
