= San Luis Valley Solar Ranch =

Photovoltaic power station in the San Luis Valley,

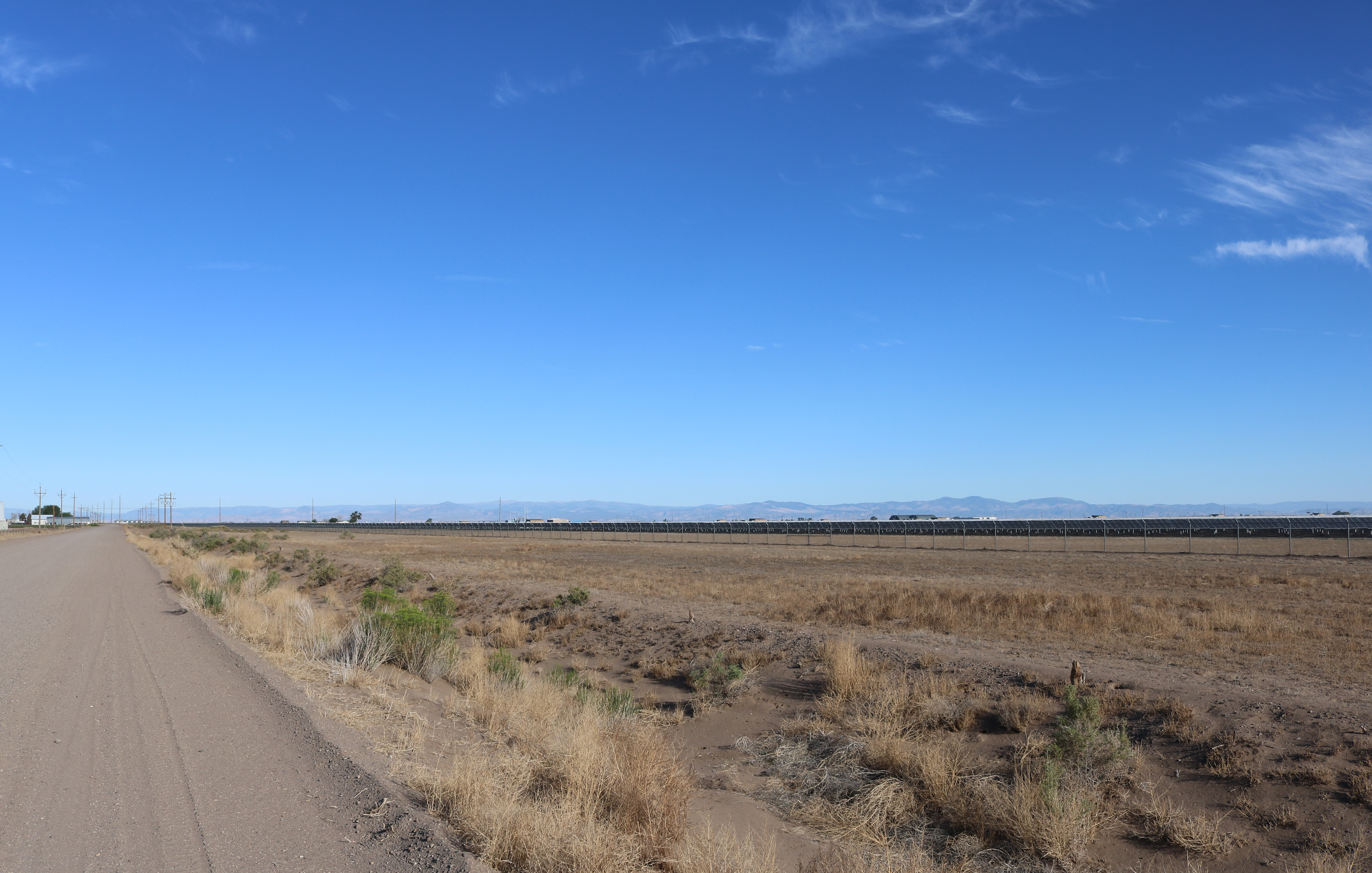
- The power station with the San Juan Mountains in the background
- Country: United States
- Location: San Luis Valley, Mosca, Colorado
- Coordinates: 37°41′30″N 105°55′00″W
- Status: Operational
- Construction began: November 2010
- Commission date: March 2012
- Owner: Iberdrola
- Operator: Avangrid Renewables

Solar farm
- Type: Flat-panel PV
- Site area: 220 acres (89 ha)

Power generation
- Units operational: 110,000 SunPower; E19-series panels
- Nameplate capacity: 30 MW_{AC}
- Capacity factor: 28.5% (average 2012-2021)
- Annual net output: 74.9 GW·h, 340 MW·h/acre

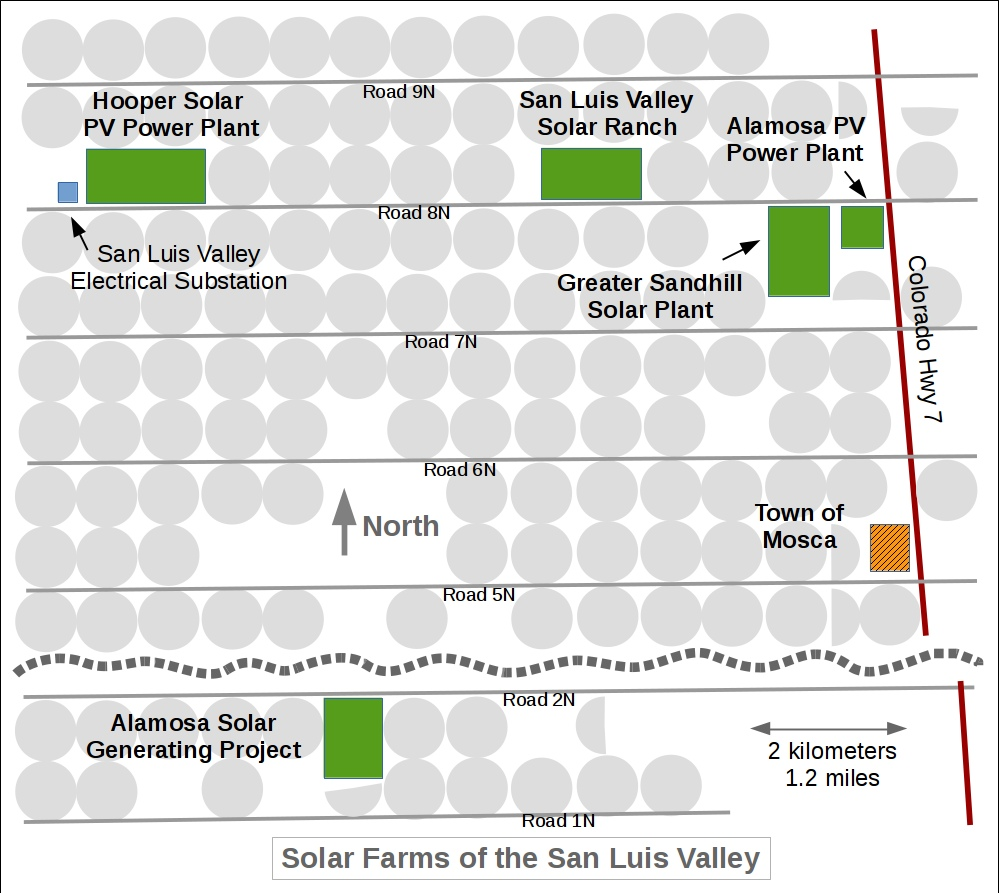
A map of solar farms in the San Luis valley

The San Luis Valley Solar Ranch is a 30 megawatt (MW_{AC}) photovoltaic power station in the San Luis Valley, located near the town of Mosca, Colorado. It was the largest solar facility in the state when it came online at the end of 2011. The electricity is being sold to Public Service of Colorado, a subsidiary of Xcel Energy, under a 20-year power purchase agreement.

== Facility details ==
The facility occupies about 220 acres of a 320-acre plot of previous agricultural farmland, and is the third utility-scale solar project to be completed in the sunny and cool San Luis Valley. It was developed and financed, and continues to be owned and operated, by the Spanish renewable energy company Iberdrola (now Avangrid in the US) which previously completed two wind energy projects in the state. The plant consists of about 110,000 SunPower E19-series panels (each rated about 320 W_{p} and 19% efficiency) that are mounted on single-axis trackers.

Iberdrola contracted with SunPower to provide the technology and construct the facility. Work at the project site began in November 2010, and included a new 150 kV transmission line to the San Luis Valley Rural Electrical Cooperative's substation. About 200 workers were employed during the construction phase. First electricity was delivered to the grid in December 2011, and the start of commercial operations was commissioned in March 2012.

== Electricity production ==
Generation (MW·h) of San Luis Valley Solar Ranch
| Year | Jan | Feb | Mar | Apr | May | Jun | Jul | Aug | Sep | Oct | Nov | Dec | Total |
|---|---|---|---|---|---|---|---|---|---|---|---|---|---|
| 2011 | | | | | | | | | | | | 2,605 | 2,605 |
| 2012 | 4,320 | 4,795 | 7,329 | 7,458 | 8,693 | 9,100 | 7,943 | 7,304 | 6,319 | 6,394 | 4,624 | 3,261 | 77,540 |
| 2013 | 3,223 | 4,397 | 6,528 | 6,710 | 7,853 | 7,713 | 7,830 | 7,410 | 6,589 | 6,311 | 4,070 | 4,100 | 72,734 |
| 2014 | 4,680 | 5,335 | 7,184 | 7,246 | 7,927 | 8,855 | 7,637 | 9,658 | 6,549 | 5,885 | 4,650 | 2,887 | 78,493 |
| 2015 | 3,277 | 4,919 | 7,229 | 7,682 | 7,359 | 8,080 | 7,177 | 7,578 | 6,720 | 5,299 | 4,652 | 3,804 | 73,776 |
| 2016 | 3,916 | 5,444 | 6,977 | 6,991 | 8,042 | 8,612 | 8,916 | 7,360 | 6,819 | 6,114 | 4,357 | 3,694 | 77,242 |
| 2017 | 3,063 | 4,772 | 6,677 | 7,370 | 8,689 | 9,416 | 8,167 | 6,834 | 5,727 | 6,779 | 4,325 | 4,440 | 76,257 |
| 2018 | 4,030 | 4,739 | 6,129 | 7,427 | 8,559 | 9,198 | 8,017 | 8,004 | 7,693 | 5,737 | 4,729 | 3,424 | 77,687 |
| 2019 | 3,787 | 3,990 | 5,945 | 6,998 | 7,450 | 8,380 | 7,932 | 8,075 | 6,666 | 6,552 | 4,072 | 2,968 | 72,817 |
| 2020 | 4,316 | 5,217 | 6,870 | 7,701 | 8,905 | 8,333 | 7,628 | 7,557 | 6,550 | 5,788 | 4,226 | 3,419 | 76,510 |
| 2021 | 3,477 | 4,024 | 5,270 | 6,288 | 6,793 | 7,112 | 8,098 | 7,552 | 6,078 | 3,958 | 3,777 | 3,275 | 65,702 |
| Average Annual Production (years 2012–2021): | | | | | | | | | | | | | 74,876 |

== See also ==
- Hooper Solar PV Power Plant
- Solar power in Colorado
- Solar power in the United States
- Renewable energy in the United States
- Renewable portfolio standard
