= UFO Watchtower =

UFO tourist attraction in Colorado

Coordinates: 37°47′19″N 105°53′14″W

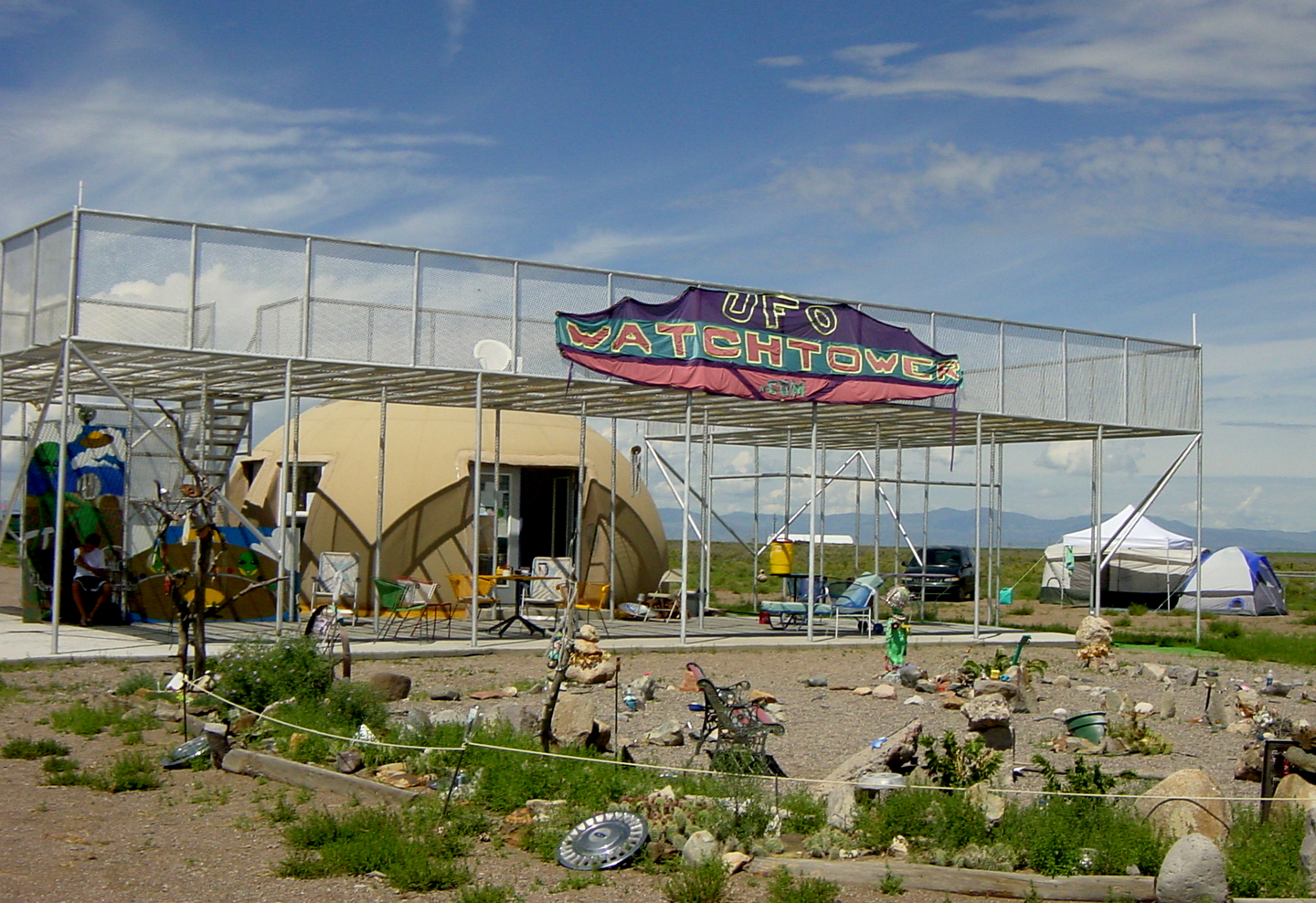
- Interactive map of the UFO Watchtower area

General information
- Location: Hooper, Colorado
- Opened: May 2000
- Owner: Judy Messoline

Height
- Height: 10 ft (3.0 m)

Design and construction
- Known for: UFO sightings, camping

Website
- Facebook page

The UFO Watchtower is an observation platform and campground north of Hooper, Colorado in San Luis Valley where tales of UFO sightings have been reported. Cattle farmer Judy Messoline converted her barn into a tourist attraction in 2000 when she was facing financial troubles. Messoline relies on donations and sales of alien themed merchandise to fund the attraction. In 2004, Messoline stated that she was receiving 75 visitors a day. In 2023, it was reported that over 30,000 had visited the Watchtower since its opening in 2000. The site is managed by Messoline's son, Larry Messoline.

== History ==
In May 2000, cattle rancher Judy Messoline facing bankruptcy decided to capitalize on the view of the sky from her property and converted her barn into a watchtower and marketed the viewing site as the place to see UFOs. People looking for UFOs had been camping on her property without permission for several years, so she asked the county commissioners permission to build the structure. The San Luis Valley is sandwiched between the San Juan and Sangre de Cristo mountains and sits at 7,600 feet altitude.

The venture became more profitable than her cattle farm, with 75 visitors a day in 2004. She did not charge admission but asked for donations and sold alien themed t-shirts and other merchandise.

The skeleton of Snippy the horse, which Judy Messoline purchased for $2000 in 2021, is on display.

== Property ==
The converted barn contains a small domed gift shop, outside steps lead to a 10-foot-high platform where people can sit and gaze into the sky. The ranch which is 620 acres also allows visitors to camp.

Located below the platform, outside of the gift shop, Messoline created a "healing garden" where visitors leave objects to "hopefully receive some sort of healing." The area is a rock garden that she says celebrates "three vortexes that several psychics say are in her front yard." The vortexes are protected by "two large beings", people leave personal items "from photos and business cards to pens, keys, toys and even personal items of lost loved ones."

== Visitors ==
Messoline hosted a UFO conference with more than 100 attendees in 2002. Lectures were given by two women who believe they have been abductees as well as Fanny Ceto who claims she was the pilot of the 1947 Roswell UFO crash and her punishment for crashing the spaceship was that she would have to remain on Earth. Another UFO conference was held in August 2003.

In 2004, Messoline admitted that she was not convinced that UFO's visit Earth, but that there are "days when she comes 'this close' to believing that there is some alien life force out there."

In an interview with Roadtrippers in 2020, Messoline stated that over 30 thousand have visited the watchtower. She states that "'People don't get made fun of here'" this is a "safe place for people to share their experiences". Reported visitors for summer 2022 were about 5 thousand visitors. Messoline in 2023 stated that visitors have reported 163 UFO sightings so far, with Messoline stating she has personally seen 27.

Larry Messoline expects more visitors to the watchtower following the 2026 release of the United States UFO files.

== See also ==
- List of reported UFO sightings
