= Fidium Fiber =

American telecommunications company

- Type: Private
- Traded as: Nasdaq: CNSL (2005-2024)
- Industry: Telecommunications
- Founded: 1894; 132 years ago, as the Mattoon Telephone Company in Mattoon, Illinois, U.S.
- Headquarters: Mattoon, Illinois, U.S.
- Key people: Gaurav Juneja (president & CEO)
- Products: Data & internet, voice, hosted & managed, cloud services, security services, IT services, wholesale services, TV, residential internet, residential phone, home security
- Revenue: ▲US$ 1.2 billion (2022)
- Operating income: ▲US$ 42.8 million (2022)
- Website: Official website

Fidium Fiber provides data, internet, voice, managed and hosted, cloud and IT services to business customers, and internet, TV, phone, and home security services to residential customers. It began trading on the NASDAQ under ticker symbol CNSL in 2005 and went private in December 2024.

== History ==
Consolidated Communications was founded as the Mattoon Telephone Company in 1894 by Dr. Iverson A. Lumpkin in Mattoon, Illinois.

In 1924, the company became the Illinois Consolidated Telephone Company (ICTC) and began acquiring telephone companies in the region over the next several decades, including telephone companies in Christian County, Montgomery County, the Illinois Southeastern Telephone Company and the Effingham, Illinois, exchange from Illinois Bell.

In 1984, Consolidated Communications, Inc. (CCI) was formed as the parent company of ICTC, Consolidated Communications Directories and Consolidated Market Response. In 2002, five years after CCI merged with McLeodUSA, the firm was acquired by a group of investors led by ICTC Chairman and President Richard A. Lumpkin, and its name was changed to Consolidated Communications.

In December 2024, Consolidated Communications Holdings, Inc., announced that it had completed its merger with Condor Merger Sub Inc., a subsidiary of Condor Holdings LLC, with investment funds managed by Searchlight Capital Partners and British Columbia Investment Management Corporation. As a result of the merger, the board of directors of Consolidated Communications resigned, and the directors of Condor Merger Sub Inc. took over the roles.

In September 2025, Consolidated Communications Holdings, Inc. finalized its rebrand to Fidium.

== States ==
The company offers internet, traditional landline phone or VoIP, home security, pay television, web hosting, and wholesale data) in 23 states across the United States.

== Acquisition history ==
- In April 2004, Consolidated Communications acquired Texas-based TXU Communications.
- In December 2007, Consolidated Communications acquired North Pittsburgh Systems Inc., including North Pittsburgh Telephone Company, Nauticom and Penn Telecom.
- In July 2012, Consolidated Communications acquired SureWest Communications, extending the company's reach to Roseville and Sacramento, California, and Kansas City.
- In October 2014, Consolidated Communications acquired Enventis Corporation, formerly HickoryTech, adding operations in Minnesota, Iowa, Wisconsin, South Dakota and North Dakota to the company's portfolio.
- In July 2016, Consolidated Communications acquired Champaign Telephone Company (CTC), a business communications provider in the Champaign-Urbana, Illinois, area.
- In July 2017, Consolidated Communications acquired FairPoint Communications, expanding the company's service area to 24 states.
