= The Tube Music Network =

Former American digital multicast TV network

- Type: Digital television network; Cable television network (Music)
- Country: United States
- Broadcast area: Nationwide

Ownership
- Owner: The Tube Media Corp.

History
- Founded: 2004; 22 years ago
- Launched: June 2005; 21 years ago
- Founder: Les Garland
- Closed: October 1, 2007; 19 years ago

The Tube Music Network, Inc., or The Tube, was an American digital multicast television network. The network was a fully owned subsidiary of The Tube Media Corp., an independent company that was founded by David Levy in 2003. The Tube focused classic and modern music videos in a format similar to the original format of cable networks MTV and VH1, prior to those networks' shift towards long-form entertainment programming. The network also aired occasional commercials and public service announcements, as well as three hours of educational and informational programming (as mandated by the Federal Communications Commission) on Saturday mornings.

The network's president and founder was Les Garland, a veteran of MTV and VH1. The ad split was 6 minutes per for the network and 1 minute to the station. The network was not sold any of the national ad time. The Tube planned to attract a wider audience than MTV and other music channels by playing music regardless of genre or decade. 700 videos would be available to play with 14 videos per hours. Additional programming was made available for the station's main channel. The network's website would be a store as visitors could buy what they see on the network.

== History and closure ==
The Tube Music Network was founded by Les Garland. Raycom Media was an initial round investor in the company. Shane Coppola, formerly of Westwood One, became involved and brought in Pat LaPlatney to head the network in 2005. LaPlatney was frustrated by a difficult capital structure that made it hard to raise additional capital. He end up working six or eight months for no salary. LaPlatney quit by August 2007 to work for Raycom Media, which was an initial round investor.

The Tube was initially available primarily in markets with stations operated by Raycom Media. In April 2005, Raycom was testing the network on station WFLX-TV, a Fox affiliate, for three weeks. Raycom then announced on April 25, 2005, it was the launch station group for The Tube affiliating 29 stations. Raycom launched the network in June 2005 on 30 stations with Cleveland being the largest market.

According to a March 2006 article in The New York Times, Tribune Broadcasting announced that it would start carrying The Tube on its stations that summer. However, it had already begun to be carried on digital subchannels of Tribune-owned stations in New York City, Los Angeles, Chicago, and Philadelphia. The network was also carried on WLVI in Boston, which was sold by Tribune to Sunbeam Television in late December 2006.

Equity Broadcasting Corporation distributed the network's programming free-to-air on Galaxy 10R Ku-band satellite for carriage by some of the individual low-power televisions that it owned in diverse U.S. cities.

Sinclair Broadcast Group would sign an affiliation agreement to carry The Tube as well. That relationship ended on January 1, 2007, in a dispute of contractual issues.

The FCC ruled that in addition to the main analog channels, each digital subchannel would also be required to run the government-mandated three hours of educational and informational programming per week, as well as any Emergency Alert System tests and bulletins. The Tube would air the animal-focused music program Wildlife Jams to meet the E/I requirements. The rules would later be changed, requiring the main channel to air more E/I programming in relation to how many subchannels that the station operated and how much "free programming" they offered.

On October 1, 2007 at 6:00 AM, The Tube ceased operations due to "financial limitations"; the last video played was Alabama 3's "Woke Up This Morning", taking advantage of its famed use as the opening theme to the TV series The Sopranos by abruptly cutting to black just as the video ended, just as how the show used the theme. In early 2008, the company had three separate shareholder class-action lawsuits filed in Florida making financial improprieties claims.

== Affiliates ==
Rank	Market	Affiliate	Digital cable channel	Owner at the time of shutdown	Replaced by
1	New York	WPIX 11 (The CW) DT2	Comcast 250; Cablevision 184; FiOS 861	Tribune Broadcasting	Was Estrella TV, now Antenna TV
2	Los Angeles	KTLA 5 (The CW) DT2	Comcast 192; Charter 305; Time Warner Cable 137; FiOS 865; Cox 805	Tribune Broadcasting	Was This TV, now Antenna TV; This TV now on 5.3
3	Chicago	WGN-TV 9 (The CW) DT2	Comcast 197	Tribune Broadcasting	Antenna TV
4	Philadelphia	WPHL-TV 17 (MyNetworkTV) DT2	Comcast 250; FiOS 867; Cablevision 184	Tribune Broadcasting	Was This TV, now Antenna TV; This TV now on 17.3
6	Dallas–Fort Worth	KDAF 33 (The CW) DT2	Time Warner Cable 419; FiOS 869; Charter 360	Tribune Broadcasting	Antenna TV
7	Boston	WLVI 56 (The CW) DT2	Comcast 296; FiOS 862	Sunbeam Television (bought from Tribune after launch of The Tube)	The Country Network
8	Washington, D.C.	WDCW 50 (The CW) DT2	FiOS 863; Comcast 207; Cox 804	Tribune Broadcasting	Was This TV, now Antenna TV; This TV now on 50.3
10	Houston	KHCW 39 (The CW) DT2 (now KIAH)	Comcast 306	Tribune Broadcasting	Was Universal Sports, now Antenna TV
12	Tampa–St. Petersburg	WTTA 38 DT2 (Dropped by Sinclair prior to closedown; see above)	unknown	Sinclair Broadcast Group	Currently silent
14	Seattle–Tacoma	KMYQ 22 (MyNetworkTV) DT2	Comcast 116; Millennium Digital Media 723	Tribune Broadcasting	KCPQ
16	Miami–Ft. Lauderdale	WSFL-TV 39 (The CW) DT2	Comcast 224; Atlantic Broadband 187	Tribune Broadcasting	Azteca América
17	Cleveland–Akron–Canton	WUAB 43 (MyNetworkTV) DT2	Time Warner Cable 545; WOW! 140; Cox 124	Raycom Media	Was This TV, now Bounce TV (This TV now on WBNX-TV 55.3)
18	Denver	KWGN-TV 2 (The CW) DT2	Comcast 248	Tribune Broadcasting	This TV
20	Sacramento	KTXL 40 (Fox) DT2	Starstream 241; Comcast 194; Charter 284	Tribune Broadcasting	Was LATV, now Antenna TV
21	St. Louis	KPLR-TV 11 (The CW) DT2	Charter 136	Tribune Broadcasting	This TV
22	Pittsburgh	WPMY (Dropped by Sinclair prior to closedown; see above)	Comcast Channel 241	Sinclair Broadcast Group	Currently silent
23	Portland, OR	KRCW-TV 32 (The CW) DT2	Comcast 303	Tribune Broadcasting	Was Universal Sports, now Antenna TV
24	Baltimore	(Dropped by Sinclair prior to closedown; see above)	unknown	Sinclair Broadcast Group	
25	Indianapolis	WTTV 4 (The CW, now CBS) DT2	Comcast 254; Insight 834	Tribune Broadcasting	Was This TV, now Indiana's 4.2, an Independent Station
27	San Diego	KSWB-TV 69 (The CW, now Fox) DT3	Cox 199	Tribune Broadcasting	This TV
28	Hartford / New Haven	WTXX 20 (The CW) DT2 (now WCCT-TV)	Comcast 250; Cox 810; Charter 752; Cablevision 184	Tribune Broadcasting	This TV
29	Raleigh–Durham	WRDC 28 DT2 (Dropped by Sinclair prior to closedown; see above)	never carried	Sinclair Broadcast Group	Currently silent
30	Nashville	WUXP-TV 30 DT2 (Dropped by Sinclair prior to closedown; see above)	unknown	Sinclair Broadcast Group	Currently silent
32	Columbus, OH	(Dropped by Sinclair prior to closedown; see above)	unknown	Sinclair Broadcast Group	
33	Cincinnati	WXIX-TV 19 (Fox) DT2	Insight 140; Time Warner Cable 920	Raycom Media	Was This TV, now Bounce TV (This TV now on WBQC-LD Channel 25.2)
34	Milwaukee	WCGV-TV 24 (MyNetworkTV) DT2 (Dropped by Sinclair prior to closedown; see above)	never carried	Sinclair Broadcast Group	Was The Country Network, now Comet
36	Greenville–Spartanburg–Anderson, SC	(Dropped by Sinclair prior to closedown; see above)	unknown	Sinclair Broadcast Group	
37	San Antonio	(Dropped by Sinclair prior to closedown; see above)	unknown	Sinclair Broadcast Group	
38	West Palm Beach–Ft. Pierce	WFLX 29 (Fox) DT2	Comcast 220 & 184	Raycom Media	Bounce TV
39	Grand Rapids	WXMI 17 (Fox) DT2	Charter 137; Comcast 254	Tribune Broadcasting	Antenna TV
40	Birmingham–Tuscaloosa–Anniston	(Dropped by Sinclair prior to closedown; see above)	unknown	Sinclair Broadcast Group	
41	Harrisburg	WPMT 43 (Fox) DT2	Comcast 250	Tribune Broadcasting	Was News 24/7, now Antenna TV; News 24/7 moved to 43.3
43	Las Vegas	(Dropped by Sinclair prior to closedown; see above)	unknown	Sinclair Broadcast Group	
44	Memphis	WMC-TV 5 (NBC) DT3	Comcast 755	Raycom Media	This TV
45	Albuquerque–Santa Fe	KASA 2 (Fox) DT2 (Dropped by station prior to closedown)	Comcast 207	LIN TV(Purchased from Raycom Media in 2006)	Currently silent
46	Oklahoma City	(Dropped by Sinclair prior to closedown; see above)	unknown	Sinclair Broadcast Group	
48	Louisville	WAVE 3 (NBC) DT3?	Insight 834	Raycom Media	Was Weather Now, now Bounce TV
56	Albany, NY	WCWN 45 (The CW) DT2	unknown	Sinclair Broadcast Group	Currently silent
58	Dayton	(Dropped by Sinclair prior to closedown; see above)	unknown	Sinclair Broadcast Group	
60	Knoxville	WTNZ 43 (Fox) DT2	Comcast 195; Charter 195	Raycom Media	This TV
61	Richmond–Petersburg	WTVR-TV 6 (CBS) DT3	Comcast 207; FiOS 867	Raycom Media	Now CBS 6 Xtra
63	Lexington, KY	(Dropped by Sinclair prior to closedown; see above)	WDKY-TV 56 (Fox)	Sinclair Broadcast Group	Currently silent
65	Charleston–Huntington WV	(Dropped by Sinclair prior to closedown; see above)	unknown	Sinclair Broadcast Group	
66	Flint–Saginaw–Bay City	(Dropped by Sinclair prior to closedown; see above)	unknown	Sinclair Broadcast Group	
70	Tucson–Sierra Vista	KOLD-TV 13 (CBS) DT3	Comcast 207; Cox 763	Raycom Media	Me-TV
71	Toledo	WNWO-TV 24 (NBC) DT2	Buckeye Cable System 625; Time Warner Cable 81	Barrington Broadcasting	Was Retro Television Network, now American Sports Network
72	Honolulu	KFVE 5 (MyNetworkTV) DT2	Oceanic Time Warner Cable 590	Raycom Media	Currently silent
73	Des Moines	(Dropped by Sinclair prior to closedown; see above)	unknown	Sinclair Broadcast Group	
74	Portland, ME	(Dropped by Sinclair prior to closedown; see above)	unknown	Sinclair Broadcast Group	Currently silent
77	Spokane, WA	KAYU 28 (Fox) DT2	Comcast 116	Mountain Broadcasting, LLC	This TV
78	Rochester, NY	(Dropped by Sinclair prior to closedown; see above)	unknown	Sinclair Broadcast Group	
79	Syracuse	WSTM-TV 3 (NBC) DT4	Time Warner Cable 864	Barrington Broadcasting	Currently silent
80	Paducah–Cape Girardeau–Harrisburg, IL	KFVS-TV 12 (CBS) DT3	City Cable 139	Raycom Media	Grit TV
81	Shreveport	KSLA-TV 12 (CBS) DT2	Time Warner 1113; Cox 245	Raycom Media	This TV
82	Champaign/Springfield	(Dropped by Sinclair prior to closedown; see above)	unknown	Sinclair Broadcast Group	The Country Network (WICS) / Was, TheCoolTV Now silent (WICD)
83	Columbia, SC	WACH 57 (Fox) DT2 (Dropped by station prior to closedown)	unknown	Barrington Broadcasting	Currently silent
84	Huntsville–Decatur–Florence	WAFF 48 (NBC) DT3	Charter 183; Comcast 184; Knology 175; Mediacom 226	Raycom Media	Currently silent
85	Madison, WI	WMSN 47 (Fox) DT2 (Dropped by Sinclair prior to closedown; see above)	never carried	Sinclair Broadcast Group	Currently silent
87	Jackson, MS	WLBT 3 (NBC) DT3	Comcast 153	Raycom Media	This TV
89	Cedar Rapids–Waterloo–Iowa City–Dubuque	KWWL 7 (NBC) DT3	Mediacom 106; Cedar Falls Cable 472	Quincy Newspapers	RTV
93	Baton Rouge	WAFB 9 (CBS) DT4	Cox 120	Raycom Media	WBXH-CA
94	Colorado Springs–Pueblo	KXRM-TV 21 (Fox) DT2	Comcast 142 & 478	Barrington Broadcasting	Retro Television Network
97	Savannah	WTOC-TV 11 (CBS) DT3	Comcast 243	Raycom Media	Was This TV, now Bounce TV
100	Charleston	(Dropped by Sinclair prior to closedown; see above)	unknown	Sinclair Broadcast Group	
101	Evansville	WFIE 14 (NBC) DT3	Insight 834; Sigecom 248	Raycom Media	Was This TV, Then Movies!/Me-TV/Grit (TV network), Now Circle (TV Network)
109	Springfield, MA	WGGB 40 (ABC) DT2	Comcast 6 Charter 10	Gormally Broadcasting, LLC	Fox-primary/MNTV-secondary
111	Tyler–Longview	KLTV 7 (ABC) 7.3	Suddenlink 245	Raycom Media	Telemundo
113	Traverse City–Cadillac	WPBN-TV 7/WTOM-TV 4 (NBC) DT2	Charter 200	Barrington Broadcasting	Retro Television Network
114	Augusta, GA	WFXG 54 (Fox) DT2	Comcast 241; Knology 179	Raycom Media	This TV
128	Columbus, GA	WXTX 54 (Fox) DT2	Mediacom 230; Knology 179; Charter 187	Raycom Media	This TV
131	Amarillo, TX	KVII-TV 7 (ABC) DT3	unknown	Barrington Broadcasting	was The Local AccuWeather Channel, now Comet
136	Wilmington, NC	WSFX-TV 26 (Fox) DT2	Time Warner Cable 925	Wilmington Telecasters, Inc. (under LMA by Raycom Media)	This TV
141	Medford, OR	KMVU 26 (Fox) DT2	Charter 286	Stainless Broadcasting Company	
145	Albany, GA	(Dropped by station prior to closedown)	unknown	Barrington Broadcasting	
147	Lubbock, TX	KCBD 11 (NBC) DT3	Suddenlink 113	Raycom Media	This TV
156	Panama City	WPGX 28 (Fox) DT2	Comcast 237; Knology 179	Raycom Media	
160	Biloxi–Gulfport	WLOX-TV 13 (ABC) DT3	Cable One 455	Raycom Media	Was This TV, now Bounce TV
165	Hattiesburg–Laurel	WDAM-TV 7 (NBC) DT2	Comcast 195	Raycom Media	This TV
172	Dothan	WDFX-TV 34 (Fox) DT2	unknown	Raycom Media	
175	Lake Charles, LA	KPLC 7 (NBC) DT3	Suddenlink 245	Raycom Media	
178	Marquette	(Dropped by station prior to closedown)	unknown	Barrington Broadcasting	
188	Lafayette, IN	WTTK 29 (The CW)	Insight 834	Tribune Broadcasting	Was This TV, now Indiana's 4.2, an Independent Station
199	Ottumwa–Kirksville	(Dropped by station prior to closedown)	unknown	Barrington Broadcasting	
200	Jonesboro, AR	KAIT 8 (ABC) DT3	unknown	Raycom Media	Relaunched in 2018 as an affiliate of The CW

== See also ==
- TheCoolTV
