= List of broadband providers in the United States =

== Largest broadband internet providers in the United States ==
Rank	Company	Brand	Total subscribers	Technology	Date/source
1	Charter Communications	Spectrum	34,300,000	Cable	Q3 2026
2	Comcast	Xfinity	28,340,000	Cable	Q3 2026
3	AT&T	AT&T Fiber	13,310,000	Fiber	Q3 2026
4	Verizon	Fios	10,910,000	Fiber	Q2 2026
5	Verizon	5G Home Internet	6,210,000	Cellular	Q2 2026
6	Optimum Communications	Optimum	4,050,000	Cable	Q2 2026
7	AT&T	AT&T Internet Air	2,940,000	Cellular	Q3 2026
8	SpaceX	Starlink	~2,700,000 (US)	Satellite	Q1 2026
9	BCE Inc.	Ziply Fiber	1,300,000	Fiber	Q1 2025
10	Mediacom	Xtream	1,300,000	Cable	Q2 2024
11	Apollo Global Management	Brightspeed	~1,000,000	Fiber	Q1 2026
12	Cable One	Sparklight	968,200	Cable	Q2 2026
13	Windstream Holdings	Kinetic	960,400	Fiber	Q2 2026
14	Cogeco	Breezeline	605,300 (US)	Cable	Q1 2026
15	Telephone and Data Systems	TDS Telecom	567,700	Fiber	Q2 2026
16	Cincinnati Bell	Altafiber	518,000	Fiber	Q4 2025
17	Alphabet Inc.	Google Fiber	453,000	Fiber	Q2 2026
18	Consolidated Communications	Fidium Fiber	399,500	Fiber	Q3 2024

== Other residential internet providers ==
- ALLO Communications
- Armstrong
- Astound Broadband
- Atlas Networks
- B2X Online - VA
- Bernard Telephone Co
- Bluepeak
- Comelec
- ComTecCloud
- Ezee Fiber
- Fiopin
- GigabitNow
- Greenlight Networks
- Honest Networks
- Hotwire Communications
- Hughesnet
- ImOn Communications
- Interlync Internet Services
- IVNet, LLP
- Midco Communications
- Monkeybrains.net
- MV Link
- PenTeleData
- Planet Networks
- Rise Broadband
- Sail Internet
- Shentel
- Sonic.net
- Starry Internet
- Surf Internet
- Ting Internet
- United Communications (TN)
- USA Communications
- Viasat
- Virtu Broadband (VIRTU)
- Viser
- WideOpenWest (WOW!)
- Wi-Fiber
- WirelessBuy
- Zentro Internet

== Other business internet providers ==
- 123NET
- ALLO Business
- Aptech Networks
- Atlas Networks
- Aureon
- B2X Online - VA
- Bluebird Fiber
- Cogent Communications
- Digital West
- EarthLink Business
- Fusion Connect
- Hotwire Communications
- Hurricane Electric
- Interlync Internet Services
- Segra
- Stealth Communications
- Ting Internet
- Towerstream
- Viser
- Zentro Internet
