= Vast =

Vast or VAST may refer to:

== Arts, entertainment, media ==
- Vast (novel), a 1998 science fiction novel by Linda Nagata
- Vast (2011 film), a Dutch film, winner of the 2011 Golden Calf for Best Television Drama
- VAST, an American alternative rock band
- Variable Architecture Synthesis Technology, a digital sound synthesis method for the Kurzweil K2000
- Video Ad Serving Template, a metadata format for video advertising
- Viewer Access Satellite Television, a satellite TV service provided by the Australian government

== Groups, organizations ==
- Vast (company), an American aerospace company
- Vast Broadband, an American cable and internet company
- Vast Studios, a Canadian video game developer
- FC Vast Mykolaiv, Ukrainian football team from the city of Mykolaiv.
- VAST (Visual Audio Sensory Theater), an American alternative rock band
- VAST Data, an American technology company focused on artificial intelligence and deep learning computing infrastructure
- Vietnam Academy of Science and Technology, in Hanoi, Vietnam
- Voest-Alpine Services and Technologies, a unit of Siemens headquartered near Pittsburgh, Pennsylvania

== People and fictional characters ==
- Fernand Vast (1886–1968), French cyclist

== Other uses ==
- Visual Analytics Science and Technology
- ASKAP survey for Variables and Slow Transients; a radio-astronomy survey
- VAX Accelerator Software Technology from Raxco

== See also ==
- Virginia Aerospace Science and Technology Scholars (VASTS), see National Space Grant College and Fellowship Program
