= Big Ten Network =

American collegiate sports network

- Country: United States
- Broadcast area: United States; Canada (HD Version); Puerto Rico; Caribbean
- Headquarters: Chicago, Illinois, U.S.

Programming
- Language: English
- Picture format: 720p (HDTV)

Ownership
- Owner: Fox Sports Media Group (Fox Corporation) (61%); Big Ten Conference (39%)
- Sister channels: Fox Sports 1 Fox Sports 2 Fox Soccer Plus; Fox Deportes

History
- Launched: June 30, 2007; 19 years ago (USA) June 1, 2009; 17 years ago (Puerto Rico)

Links
- Website: btn.com

Availability

Streaming media
- Fox Sports app (requires login from eligible pay television provider to access content): Watch live
- B1G+ (requires separate paid-subscription to access content): Watch live
- Fox One: fox.com: (American cable internet subscribers only; requires subscription, trial, or television provider login to access content)
- Service(s): DirecTV Stream, FuboTV, Hulu + Live TV, Sling TV, YouTube TV

Big Ten Network (BTN) is an American sports network based in Chicago, Illinois. The channel is dedicated to coverage of collegiate sports sanctioned by the Big Ten Conference, including live and recorded event telecasts, news, analysis programs and other content focusing on the conference's member schools. It is a joint venture between Fox Sports and the Big Ten, with Fox Corporation as 61% stakeholder and operating partner and the Big Ten Conference owning a 39% stake. It is headquartered in the former Montgomery Ward & Co. Catalog House building at 600 West Chicago Avenue in Chicago.

Big Ten Network is carried by most major television providers and as of 2022, had an estimated 50 million U.S. subscribers. By June 2023, this number has dropped to 48.7 million households. It is available on the Fox One streaming service along with other Fox networks.

Big Ten Network was the second U.S. sports network to be devoted to a single college sports conference, having been preceded by the MountainWest Sports Network one year prior to its launch. BTN was later followed by rival cable channels by the Pac-12, SEC and ACC with a similar array of programming.

== History ==
The network's foundation traces back to 2004, following negotiations between the Big Ten and ESPN on an extension of the conference's broadcast contract with the network. With three years remaining in the existing deal, the conference sought a significant increase in rights fees. ESPN, however, balked, causing Big Ten commissioner Jim Delany to begin exploring the creation of his own network.

The launch of the Big Ten Network was announced on June 21, 2006, as a 20-year joint project between the Big Ten Conference and Fox Entertainment Group. At launch, the conference owned 51% of the network, while Fox owned a minority interest and handled its operations. The network was positioned to be the first ever cable channel dedicated to a single collegiate conference. The network also has a commitment to "event equality", stating it would produce and distribute an equal number of men's and women's events across all platforms, within three years of its launch. The deal was meant to replace the Big Ten's television contract with ESPN's ESPN Plus regional television package. ESPN Plus games were typically only seen on one broadcast television station in a team's local market (for example, the Illinois Fighting Illini aired its games on Champaign, Illinois CBS affiliate WCIA (channel 3)).

Original logo used from 2007 to 2011

Big Ten Network was launched at 8:00 p.m. Eastern Time on August 30, 2007, with Big Ten Tonight as its inaugural program. The network aired its first live telecasts two days later on September 1, which included a football game between Appalachian State and Michigan – the game gained national attention for its upset victory; being the first win by a Division I FCS team over a ranked Division I FBS team since Division I was split into two subdivisions by the NCAA in 1978. On September 2, the network aired its first women's sports event (a soccer match between Syracuse University and Michigan State) and its first men's non-revenue sports event (a soccer match between UCLA at Indiana).

The new network suffered from limited carriage on its launch, as it was only carried by two major television providers. By the following year, the network had reached its goal to attain carriage on the "extended basic" tiers of cable providers in all Big Ten markets. While no specifics were revealed, Fox increased its stake in the Big Ten Network to 51% in June 2010, acquiring majority control, using a provision in its contract with the conference. To coincide with the 2011 college football season, the network unveiled a new logo that made "BTN" the primary name of the channel, and introduced a new TV Everywhere service known as "BTN2Go," which offers live streaming of BTN telecasts and other programming through a web browser or mobile app. The service was initially available to subscribers of Time Warner Cable, Charter Communications, DirecTV and Dish Network.

BTN and Dish Network were involved in a dispute leading up to the expiration of the satellite provider's contract with the network in August 2012, a day before that year's college football season began. The network was temporary blacked out for eight days beginning on September 14, giving way to a new agreement that restored BTN on Dish Network on September 22.

In July 2017, as part of a new six-year agreement that made Fox the primary television rightsholder of regular season Big Ten football games, Fox's contract to run BTN was extended through 2032. Concurrent with these agreements, BTN became the de jure owner of the Big Ten's media rights, with all future media rights deals officially being sublicenses of these rights to other broadcasters. This aspect of the agreement became relevant upon the conference's next round of media rights in 2023, when it was discovered that the conference could not sublicense the Big Ten football championship without paying compensation to Fox.

On December 14, 2017, 21st Century Fox announced it would sell a majority of its assets to The Walt Disney Company, owners of ESPN, SEC Network and the then-upcoming ACC Network, in a transaction valued at over $52 billion. 21st Century Fox's stake in the Big Ten Network was not included in the deal and was spun off to the significantly downsized Fox Corporation, along with the Fox network, Fox News, Fox Business, FS1, and FS2. The deal was approved by Disney and Fox shareholders on July 27, 2018, and was completed on March 20, 2019.

The network introduced a new logo on October 23, 2020, coinciding with the start of the delayed 2020 football season. The new logo returns to using "Big Ten Network" as the primary name of the channel, and incorporates the conference's "B1G" wordmark. In 2021, the Big Ten sold part of its stake to Fox. As a result of the sale, the Big Ten's ownership stake decreased to 39% while Fox's increased to 61%.

== Programming ==
=== Original programs ===
- The B1G Show – a half-hour show airing on most weekdays that is similar to ESPN's SportsCenter; it offers highlights and discussion of Big Ten sporting events. The program is currently anchored by Dave Revsine, Rick Pizzo, Mike Hall and Lisa Cornwell. Other reporters and analysts appear depending on the sport being discussed.
- Big Ten Football Saturday – a program airing Saturdays (with pre-game, halftime and post-game editions) during the college football season, which features discussions and highlights of the day's games. It is hosted by Dave Revsine, with analysis provided by Gerry DiNardo (nicknamed by the hosts as "Coach") and Howard Griffith.
- Big Ten Tailgate – originally titled Friday Night Tailgate, it is a Friday night program that takes a lighthearted and irreverent look at campus life surrounding the weekend of a Big Ten football game. It was host was Mike Hall, with correspondents Charissa Thompson and Chicago-area improv actors Jordan Klepper, Steve Waltien, and Tim Baltz. 90-minute In 2010, the show was cut to 60 minutes and was renamed as Big Ten Tailgate.
- Big Ten Tip-Off Show – a pre-game show airing during the regular season from November to March discussing the day's basketball games; it is hosted by Dave Revsine, with analysis provided by Gene Keady, Jimmy Jackson, Tim Doyle and Kendall Gill.
- Coaches Q&A – a program featuring excerpts from the week's press conferences around the conference.
- The Big Ten's Greatest Games – a showcase of classic football and basketball games, with editing of some non-essential game action out to fit time constraints.
- The Big Ten Women's Show – an hour-long Monday night program covering women's sports throughout the conference.
- The Big Ten Quad – a weekly sports discussion show with Big Ten legends.
- Big Ten Cookout – a half-hour live cooking/tailgate show on Saturday mornings, taking place at a different university campus within the conference each week; it is hosted by Melanie Collins, alongside chefs Julius Russell and former Hell's Kitchen season five contestant Ben Walanka.
- The Big Ten's Best – a weekly countdown show with lists of the top 10 Big Ten teams or players in a certain category, such as "best running backs of the 1990s" or "best quarterbacks of the 1980s"; hosted by Charissa Thompson.
- Various coach's shows
- University Showcase – a program block of non-sports campus produced programs; each school has equal time.
- Student U – Game broadcasts produced by university broadcast departments involving students controlling production and play-by-play which are usually seen only on closed-circuit campus cable networks.
- "Big Ten Frozen Fridays" – a hockey pregame show on Friday nights, airing before most Big Ten hockey game telecasts, featuring game previews and highlights from around the Big Ten Conference
- Big Ten Football: Breakdown – a weekly series airing on Tuesdays in which Big Ten coaches and players review the previous week's game footage, with network analysts providing a look at the nuances of the game and what affected the teams' success.
- Big Ten Football: Sites & Sounds – a Wednesday night program that includes segments from press conferences, media interviews and the games, as well as other behind-the-scenes footage, hosted from the network's Chicago studios.
- Big Ten Football: Behind the Schemes – airing Thursday nights, it is a breakdown featuring the network's resident head coach analysts, analyzing footage of the previous week's games and putting together game plans for games being held that week.
- Big Ten Football… & Beyond – a Friday night program previewing the weekend's upcoming games with reports from each Big Ten stadium and a look at key national matchups that could impact the conference postseason.
- Big Ten Film Vault – a program, hosted by Dan Dierdorf, showcasing a vintage Big Ten film from the 1940s to the 1970s.
- Big Ten Icons – a series highlighting a Big Ten athlete from a wide range of sports and history. Notable subjects include Jesse Owens, Jack Nicklaus and Steve Alford.
- The Journey: Big Ten Basketball – a Sunday night documentary-style series following multiple teams each week throughout the conference's 10-week basketball season.
- Big Ten Treasure Hunter – a program starring memorabilia collector John Arcand in which he travels around Big Ten territories and make negotiations with fans to buy Big Ten memorabilia.

==== Former ====
- Big Ten Hoops: On Campus – an hour-long Friday night program (hosted by Mike Hall, Jim Jackson, Tiffany Simons and Natalie Kane) featuring visits to different campuses each week to showcase the loyalty and tradition behind Big Ten basketball and its fans.
- This Week in Big Ten Basketball – a Sunday night program providing comprehensive breakdowns of the week's college basketball action involving Big Ten teams; it was hosted by Dave Revsine, Jim Jackson and Dan Dakich.

=== Sports coverage ===
==== Football ====
Big Ten Network holds national broadcast rights to all of the conference's home football games and televises approximately 35-40 football games each season. Each team is guaranteed to appear a minimum of two times annually on the network, one of which must be a conference game.

==== Basketball ====
The network holds national television rights to all men's basketball conference home games; all non-conference and exhibition games are either televised or streamed on bigtennetwork.com. Each of the conference's men's basketball teams appear on the network approximately 10-20 times a season; it carries approximately 60–65 in-conference match-ups, as well as select tournament contests.

Big Ten Network also televises approximately 50-60 regular season women's basketball games annually, along with approximately nine Big Ten Basketball Tournament games. Each Big Ten team appears on the network approximately 8 to 10 times during the season. The network streams dozens of games live on its website, giving Big Ten women's basketball the most exposure of any conference in the country. The network maintains a set on-site during the Big Ten men's and women's basketball tournaments in Indianapolis, Indiana with anchors providing coverage and analysis of each day's game action during the event.

==== Other sports ====
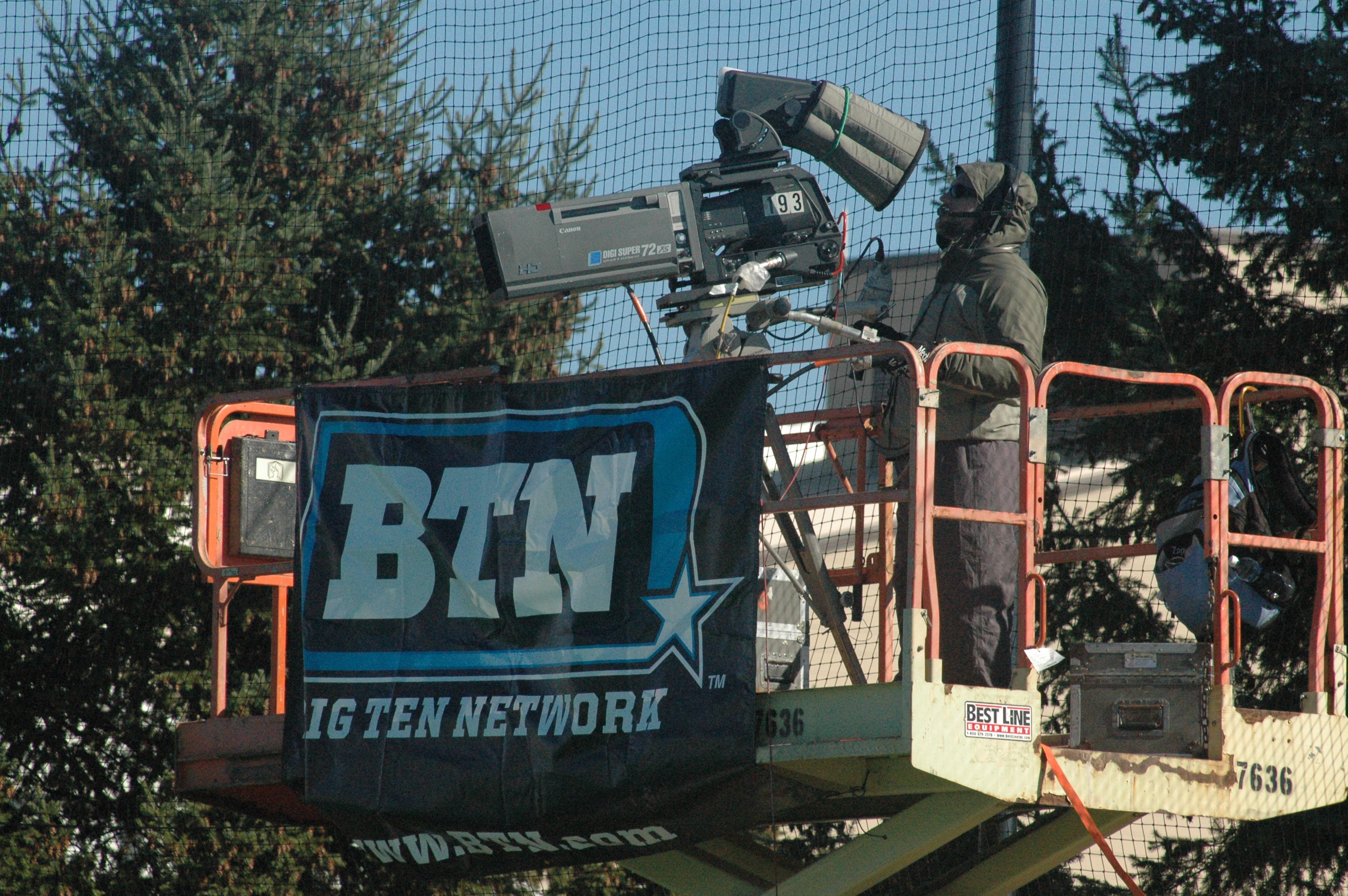
A Big Ten Network camera operator at work during a 2011 field hockey game

Big Ten Network televises approximately 25 of the conference's baseball games each spring, with each team making approximately 5 to 8 appearances annually. In 2009, the network televised the entirety of the Big Ten baseball tournament.

In the 2013–14 season, Big Ten Network expanded its coverage of college ice hockey due to the Big Ten Conference beginning to officially sponsor the sport, broadcasting 27 games as well as the Big Ten tournament, and adding associated studio programs. The Big Ten Network televises more than 170 NCAA-sponsored Olympic events in both men's and women's sports such as hockey, soccer, volleyball, track and field, swimming and diving.

==== Esports ====
In April 2016, it was announced that BTN and Riot Games would organize a collegiate League of Legends event, the BTN Invitational, between teams representing Michigan State and Ohio State. The tournament was held at PAX East in Boston, alongside the semi-finals and finals of the Riot's college championship. Michael Sherman, head of Riot's collegiate competitions, stated that "there was actually a student group at Penn State that was looking to run a Big Ten tournament, and the Big Ten Network got word of it and through that we actually connected to each other and saw that we had a lot of interest in sort of building an competition together."

In January 2017, BTN and Riot announced that it would hold a season of conference competition between teams representing 12 Big Ten schools, culminating with a championship whose winner would receive an invite to Riot's college championship. The competition was primarily streamed online, but later rounds were televised on BTN. In January 2018, Riot and BTN announced an extension of the partnership through 2019, complete with scholarship funds for teams ($35,000/team yearly) and the addition of Penn State and Nebraska, bringing all full conference members to the partnership. ESL became a partner with BTN's competition for 2019.

==== Tournament and championship events ====
The Big Ten Network televises 21 Big Ten Championships and Tournaments, including baseball, men's and women's basketball, men's and women's cross country, field hockey, men's and women's golf, men's and women's gymnastics, rowing, men's and women's soccer, men's and women's swimming and diving, men's and women's tennis, men's and women's indoor and outdoor track and field, and wrestling.

In February 2017, the NCAA announced that Big Ten Network had acquired rights to the Women's Frozen Four—the NCAA national championship of Women's ice hockey, beginning in 2017 under a four-year deal. BTN broadcast the finals in 2017, and began airing the semi-finals beginning 2018. ESPN (who televises all other NCAA national championships outside of men's basketball) took over the rights in 2021.

== On-air staff ==
=== Current on-air staff ===
- Mike Hall – studio host
- Rick Pizzo – studio host
- Dave Revsine – studio host and play-by-play announcer
- Lisa Byington – studio host and play-by-play announcer
- Gerry DiNardo – football analyst
- Howard Griffith – football analyst
- Dave Wannstedt – football studio host
- Corey Wootton – football analyst
- Michelle McMahon – studio host and BTN Tailgate
- Stanley Jackson – studio host and football analyst
- Robbie Hummel – men's basketball studio host and analyst
- Andy Katz – men's basketball studio host and analyst
- Shon Morris – men's basketball studio host and analyst
- Elise Menaker – studio host and reporter
- Nicole Darin – studio reporter
- Allison Hayes Freeze – studio reporter
- Damon Benning – football studio reporter
- Pat Forde – studio reporter
- Nicole Auerbach – studio reporter
- Rob Blackman – football studio reporter
- Ryan Baker – football studio reporter
- Ray Lucas – studio reporter
- Dean Linke – play-by-play announcer
- Marcus Ray – studio reporter
- Bruce Weber – men's basketball studio analyst

==== Football ====
- Joe Beninati – football play-by-play announcer
- Lisa Byington – football play-by-play announcer
- Mark Followill – football play-by-play announcer
- Guy Haberman – football play-by-play announcer
- Jason Horowitz – football play-by-play announcer
- Carlo Jimenez – football play-by-play announcer
- Jeff Levering – football play-by-play announcer
- Rhett Lewis – football play-by-play announcer and sideline reporter
- AJ Kanell – football play-by-play announcer
- Jack Kizer – football play-by-play announcer
- Jason Ross Jr.– football play-by-play announcer
- Chris Vosters – football play-by-play announcer
- Anthony Herron – football color analyst
- Jake Butt – football color analyst
- Lincoln Kennedy – football color analyst
- Ben Leber – football color analyst
- Matt Millen – football color analyst
- Tanner Morgan – football color analyst
- Marcel Reece – football color analyst
- Yogi Roth – football color analyst
- Jared Thomas – football color analyst
- Brock Vereen – football color analyst
- Drea Avent – football sideline reporter
- Emma Carpenter – football sideline reporter
- Alyssa Charlton-Smith – football sideline reporter
- Michella Chester – football sideline reporter
- Brooke Fletcher – football sideline reporter
- Caroline Hendershot – football sideline reporter
- Elise Menaker – football sideline reporter
- Kylen Mills – football sideline reporter
- Rick Pizzo – football sideline reporter
- Melanie Ricks – football sideline reporter
- Dannie Rogers – football sideline reporter
- Sydney Supple – football sideline reporter

==== Basketball ====
- Kevin Kugler – lead basketball play-by-play announcer
- Brandon Gaudin – basketball play-by-play announcer
- Dave Resvine – basketball play-by-play announcer
- Lisa Byington – basketball play-by-play announcer
- Jeff Levering – basketball play-by-play announcer
- Chris Vosters – basketball play-by-play announcer
- AJ Kanell – basketball play-by-play announcer
- Jason Horowitz – basketball play-by-play announcer
- Guy Haberman – basketball play-by-play announcer
- Cory Provus – basketball play-by-play announcer
- Jason Ross Jr. – basketball play-by-play announcer
- Connor Onion – basketball play-by-play announcer
- Joe Beninati – basketball play-by-play announcer
- Jack Kizer – basketball play-by-play announcer
- Ed Cohen – basketball play-by-play announcer
- Aaron Goldsmith – basketball play-by-play announcer
- Joe Malfa – basketball play-by-play announcer
- John Beilein – basketball color analyst
- Robbie Hummel – lead basketball color analyst
- Mike DeCourcy – basketball color analyst
- Andy Katz – basketball color analyst
- Steve Smith – basketball color analyst
- Shon Morris – basketball color analyst
- Christy Winters-Scott – basketball color analyst
- Bruce Weber – basketball color analyst
- Jordan Taylor – basketball color analyst
- Austin Johnson – basketball color analyst
- Jim Jackson – basketball color analyst
- Nik Stauskas – basketball color analyst
- Trent Meacham – basketball color analyst
- Tammy Blackburn – basketball color analyst
- Jerry Dunn – basketball color analyst
- Don MacLean – basketball color analyst
- Earl Watson – basketball color analyst

==== Baseball ====
- Danan Hughes – baseball analyst
- Scott Pose – baseball analyst
- Kevin Kugler – baseball play-by-play announcer
- Brandon Gaudin – baseball play-by-play announcer
- Michael Huff – studio reporter

==== Ice hockey ====
- Ben Clymer – ice hockey analyst
- Paul Caponigri – ice hockey analyst
- Billy Jaffe – ice hockey analyst
- Fred Pletsch – ice hockey analyst and Play-by-play
- Aaron Ward – ice hockey analyst

==== Volleyball ====
- Grace Loberg – volleyball analyst
- Telly Hughes – volleyball studio host
- Emily Ehman – volleyball color analyst

==== Wrestling ====
- Shane Nebl Sparks – wrestling announcer
- Jim Gibbons – wrestling announcer
- Tim Johnson – wrestling announcer

=== Former on-air staff ===
- Thom Brennaman – lead play-by-play announcer (later lead television voice for the Cincinnati Reds on Fox Sports Ohio, announcer for MLB on Fox, NFL on Fox and NFL Europe on Fox and FX)
- Matt Devlin – play-by-play announcer (now television play-by-play announcer for the Toronto Raptors)
- Cal Eldred – baseball analyst (now pitching coach for the Kansas City Royals)
- Rebecca Haarlow – sideline reporter for football and baseball (now with MSG Network and NBA on TNT)
- Ben Holden – play-by-play announcer (now college hockey announcer for Fox Sports Detroit, Comcast Local and CBS Sports Network)
- Gus Johnson – play-by-play announcer (now NFL and Pac-12 announcer for Fox Sports)
- Wayne Larrivee – play-by-play announcer (longtime Big Ten play-by-play announcer; now does play-by-play for the Packers Radio Network)
- Charissa Thompson – sideline reporter (now with Fox Sports and later co-host of entertainment news magazine Extra)
- Stephanie White – women's basketball analyst (now women's basketball coach for the Indiana Fever in the WNBA and women's college basketball analyst for ESPN)
- Rod Woodson – now an analyst for the NFL on Westwood One
- Eric Collins – play-by-play announcer (now television play-by-play announcer for the Charlotte Hornets on Fox Sports Southeast and Fox Sports South, occasional announcer for Fox Major League Baseball and Fox College Hoops)
- Josh Lewin – play-by-play announcer (longtime play-by-play announcer for Fox Major League Baseball, now college basketball and football play-by-play announcer for the UCLA Bruins)
- Stephen Bardo – basketball color analyst

== Other services ==
=== High definition and 4K ===
Big Ten Network launched in both standard definition and a 720p high definition simulcast. All of its original programs and studio shows are broadcast in HD, as well as nearly all of its sports telecasts and some of its university-produced coaches and campus shows. The channel has produced all of its football games in HD since 2009.

In September 2017, BTN revealed plans to televise selected games from the 2018 Big Ten men's basketball tournament in 4K. Every tournament from then on has included 4K coverage.

=== Streaming platforms ===
BTN2Go was Big Ten Network's TV Everywhere service, which offers online streaming of BTN programming to subscribers on qualifying television providers. Beginning in the 2017–18 season, BTN2Go content became available within Fox Sports' main TV Everywhere app Fox Sports Go.

In July 2019, due to the Fox Sports Go platform being divested with the Fox Sports Networks as part of the acquisition of 21st Century Fox by Disney, BTN content moved from Fox Sports Go to the main Fox Sports website and apps. The BTN2Go app was replaced by Big Ten Plus (B1G+), a subscription over-the-top streaming service for non-televised Big Ten events, in August 2019. The service is run by students at Big Ten institutions. Each school produces broadcasts for the streaming service.

In September 2025, Big Ten Network became part of Fox Corporation's new subscription over-the-top service Fox One; Big Ten Plus is also available via the platform as an add-on.

=== Football overflow feeds ===
On many Saturdays during the football season, the Big Ten Network produces multiple games that air at the same time. The network designates one game as its national game, which is shown on the main channel on satellite providers. The remaining games air on the main channel in the local markets and on the extra overflow channels in the remaining markets. Most cable systems inside the Big Ten's eight states offer these Big Ten Network overflow or "out-of-market" feeds to provide additional football games. All of the additional overflow feeds for the network's various football telecasts are available nationally on DirecTV and Dish Network; and regionally on AT&T U-verse, many Comcast systems, and several other cable providers. Some providers only carry the overflow feeds in standard definition, and providers outside of the U.S. provide them in out-of-market subscription packages. Since 2019, all Big Ten Network football games are also available via the Fox Sports app, regardless of geography and wireline restrictions.

== Carriage ==
Carriage negotiations with several major cable providers were stalled for several months due to their interest in placing the channel on a sports tier, with the providers only wanting to charge customers who wanted to subscribe to it; Big Ten Network, however, wanted providers to carry it on their extended basic tiers so that subscribers would not have to pay an extra fee to receive the network. Comcast, the largest cable provider in the U.S., reached a deal to carry the network on June 19, 2008, and began adding the channel to its systems on August 15, 2008; other major providers in states with universities in the Big Ten Conference (including Charter Communications and Time Warner Cable) would soon follow suit. Additionally, the Big Ten Network is an associate member of the Caribbean Cable Cooperative.

=== Carriage agreements ===
DirecTV and AT&T U-verse were the only major television providers to carry the channel at launch; however, 250 smaller cable systems (including those that are members of the National Cable Television Cooperative) also carried BTN at launch. Dish Network added the channel one week later in early September 2007.

During the late summer and early fall of 2008, several larger cable companies within states where a Big Ten university was located reached agreements to carry Big Ten Network, expanding its carriage to every major cable provider in those areas. On August 23, 2008, Mediacom (which services most of Iowa, including Iowa City, where Big Ten member, the University of Iowa, is located) was reported by Cedar Rapids newspaper The Gazette to have reached an agreement in principle to carry the network according to sources close to negotiations; the deal was announced on August 28.

On August 25, Time Warner Cable and the Big Ten Network announced in a joint statement that the two parties had reached a carriage deal. Time Warner Cable carries the channel on its expanded basic service in the eight states where Big Ten universities are located. These deals were later followed by carriage agreements with Charter Communications on August 26 and Cox Communications on August 28. Also on August 26, 2008, The Indianapolis Star reported that Bright House Networks was "very close to a deal" to carry the channel. On September 30, Broadstripe added the channel to its systems in Michigan.

On June 23, 2009, Cablevision added the channel in standard and high definition to its Optimum systems. The following month on August 25, the network reached a carriage agreement with Atlantic Broadband, which added the network's standard and high definition feed on September 1, 2009, to its systems in central and northern Pennsylvania. On December 28, 2009, Charter Communications reached an agreement to provide the network to its systems in St. Louis and Southern Illinois on the provider's expanded basic-digital tier.

On July 24, 2017, the Big Ten Network announced they would be available on Hulu Live TV and YouTube TV.

On April 11, 2018, Comcast's Xfinity dropped Big Ten Network in a number of "out-of-market" states that fall outside of the conference's direct geographical footprint, with other selected markets dropping the network on May 10, 2018. This notably included the 23,000 Comcast customers in New York, despite the recent addition of Rutgers University in New Jersey having been used to market the conference and BTN in neighboring New York City. On August 24, 2018, Comcast reached an agreement to renew its carriage of BTN, and stated that the channel would be reinstated on its sports and entertainment tier outside of the Big Ten's footprint.

In August 2024, issues between BTN and Comcast would emerge again with the Big Ten's expansion to the west coast. With California, Oregon, and Washington now part of the conference's in-market footprint, Fox sought higher carriage fees and basic tier carriage for the channel. However, Comcast wished to continue offering the channel on its "More Sports and Entertainment" tier. As a result, BTN began to black out event telecasts involving the Oregon Ducks, UCLA Bruins, USC Trojans, and Washington Huskies for Xfinity subscribers in the regions. The blackout ended on October 10, 2024, when Fox reached an agreement for in-market carriage of BTN on Comcast's basic tier in western markets.

=== Canadian carriage ===
In September 2008, the Canadian Radio-television and Telecommunications Commission approved a request by Shaw Communications to allow carriage of BTN in Canada on its specialty television services. While CTVglobemedia filed a concern that it would create undue competition (which is prohibited between foreign and domestic services) with its mainstream sports channel TSN, the CRTC determined that Big Ten Network's specific scope in coverage did not create undue competition with domestic mainstream sports services such as TSN. The network became available to Shaw Cable customers on December 3, 2008. The channel became available on Rogers Cable systems in Ontario and New Brunswick on October 22, 2009.

As of 2020, the channel is carried by Cogeco, Eastlink, Rogers Cable, Shaw Cable, Shaw Direct and VMedia.
