= Tachus Fiber Internet =

American internet service provider

- Company type: Subsidiary
- Industry: Telecommunications
- Founded: 2018; 8 years ago
- Founder: Hal Brumfield; Carter Old
- Headquarters: The Woodlands, Texas
- Services: High speed internet
- Owner: I Squared Capital (Owner of Ezee Fiber)
- Parent: Ezee Fiber
- Website: https://tachus.com

Tachus is an American telecommunications company based in The Woodlands, Texas owned by Ezee Fiber. It specializes in 100% fiber-optic service, providing internet to the Greater Houston area, including Conroe, The Woodlands, Kingwood, and other surrounding communities.

== History ==
Tachus was founded in 2018 after co-founder Hal Brumfield was frustrated with larger internet service providers who raised prices without any service upgrades. The firm was founded with the goal to provide reliable high-speed internet to communities in the Houston metropolitan area.

Tachus Fiber Internet completed its first customer installation in Montgomery County in August 2019. In May 2021, a deal was struck between then-owner Crosstimbers Capital Group and Grain Management to sell Tachus to the latter which fell through.

After reaching 10,000 customers in September 2021, Tachus already had 50,000 four months later. In 2023, a year after announcing plans to expand into the Dallas–Fort Worth area, the firm decided to spend $100 million to expand its reach in the Houston metropolitan area.

In September 2025, Crosstimbers sold Tachus to Ezee Fiber, a Houston-based internet service provider owned by I Squared Capital.

== Customer Service ==
Tachus offers multiple levels of service, but the company claims to include the same guarantee of lifetime pricing, symmetrical speeds, and unlimited data usage in all of its plans. Tachus also has a Net Promoter Score (NPS) of 88, indicating a high customer satisfaction rate.

== See also ==
- Fiber-optic communication
- List of broadband providers in the United States
- Telecommunications in the United States
