= Graceba Total Communications =

US telecoms company

- Industry: Telecommunications
- Founded: 1912
- Defunct: 2008
- Fate: Acquired by Knology
- Headquarters: Dothan, Alabama
- Products: cable television, broadband
- Website: http://www.graceba.com/

Graceba Total Communications was an American company that provided cable TV and broadband Internet service to Houston County, Alabama.

== Legal actions ==
Graceba was involved with a legal dispute with the FCC regarding allegedly improper procedures that took place in 1994 during an auction of licenses to provide interactive video data service (IVDS) in local telecommunications markets. In 1997 the courts ruled against Graceba's petition, on the grounds that their complaint wasn't registered in a timely fashion. Graceba then resubmitted their petition on appeal, and it was rejected by the United States Court of Appeals for the District of Columbia Circuit in 2000. However, the FCC did implicitly acknowledge the legitimacy of at least part of Graceba's complaints, as they issued a partial refund of fees to the participants of the 1994 auction.
