= List of wired multiple-system broadband providers in Massachusetts (by municipality) =

This is a list of municipalities with available wired multiple-system ("triple play") broadband providers, often commonly known as cable franchise holders, or fiber to the premises providers as covered under M.G.L. c.166A. As of 2015 Massachusetts had ten registered providers which served 308 communities (out of 351), with those 308 having at least one franchise provider. It is estimated that these ten providers alone contributed roughly $3.5 billion dollars to the Commonwealth's economy in 2011.

A handful of municipal owned providers in the state also form a collective known as the Massachusetts Alliance for Municipal Electric Choice (MAMEC).

Municipality	Providers	Type	County	Population (2010)	Year established
Abington	Comcast · Verizon	Town	Plymouth	15,985	1712
Acton	Comcast · Verizon	Town	Middlesex	21,924	1735
Acushnet	Comcast	Town	Bristol	10,303	1860
Adams	Spectrum	Town	Berkshire	8,485	1778
Agawam	Comcast	City	Hampden	28,438	1855
Alford	Whip City Fiber	Town	Berkshire	494	1773
Amesbury	Breezeline · Comcast	City	Essex	16,283	1668
Amherst	Comcast	Town	Hampshire	37,819	1775
Andover	Comcast · Verizon	Town	Essex	33,201	1646
Aquinnah	Comcast	Town	Dukes	311	1870
Arlington	Comcast · RCN · Verizon	Town	Middlesex	42,844	1807
Ashburnham	Comcast	Town	Worcester	6,081	1765
Ashby	Comcast	Town	Middlesex	3,074	1767
Ashfield	Whip City Fiber	Town	Franklin	1,737	1765
Ashland	Comcast · Verizon	Town	Middlesex	16,593	1846
Athol	Spectrum	Town	Worcester	11,584	1762
Attleboro	Comcast	City	Bristol	43,593	1694
Auburn	Spectrum	Town	Worcester	16,188	1778
Avon	Comcast	Town	Norfolk	4,356	1888
Ayer	Comcast	Town	Middlesex	7,427	1871
Barnstable	Comcast	City	Barnstable	45,193	1639
Barre	Spectrum	Town	Worcester	5,398	1774
Becket	Vacant	Town	Berkshire	1,779	1765
Bedford	Comcast · Verizon	Town	Middlesex	13,320	1729
Belchertown	Spectrum	Town	Hampshire	14,649	1761
Bellingham	Comcast · Verizon	Town	Norfolk	16,332	1719
Belmont	Comcast · Verizon	Town	Middlesex	24,729	1859
Berkley	Comcast	Town	Bristol	6,411	1735
Berlin	Spectrum	Town	Worcester	2,866	1812
Bernardston	Comcast	Town	Franklin	2,129	1762
Beverly	Comcast	City	Essex	39,502	1668
Billerica	Comcast · Verizon	Town	Middlesex	40,243	1655
Blackstone	Comcast	Town	Worcester	9,026	1845
Blandford	Vacant	Town	Hampden	1,233	1741
Bolton	Comcast	Town	Worcester	4,897	1738
Boston	Comcast · RCN · Verizon	City	Suffolk	617,660	1630
Bourne	Comcast	Town	Barnstable	19,754	1884
Boxborough	Comcast · Verizon	Town	Middlesex	4,996	1835
Boxford	Comcast · Verizon	Town	Essex	7,965	1685
Boylston	Spectrum	Town	Worcester	4,355	1785
Braintree	BELD · Comcast · Verizon (BELD does not provide television service)	City	Norfolk	35,744	1640
Brewster	Comcast	Town	Barnstable	9,820	1803
Bridgewater	Comcast	City	Plymouth	26,563	1656
Brimfield	Spectrum	Town	Hampden	3,609	1731
Brockton	Comcast	City	Plymouth	93,810	1821
Brookfield	Spectrum	Town	Worcester	3,390	1718
Brookline	Comcast · RCN	Town	Norfolk	58,732	1705
Buckland	Comcast	Town	Franklin	1,902	1779
Burlington	Comcast · RCN · Verizon	Town	Middlesex	24,498	1799
Cambridge	Comcast	City	Middlesex	105,162	1636
Canton	Comcast · Verizon	Town	Norfolk	21,561	1797
Carlisle	Comcast	Town	Middlesex	4,852	1780
Carver	Comcast	Town	Plymouth	11,509	1790
Charlemont	Vacant	Town	Franklin	1,266	1765
Charlton	Spectrum	Town	Worcester	12,981	1755
Chatham	Comcast	Town	Barnstable	6,125	1712
Chelmsford	Comcast · Verizon	Town	Middlesex	33,802	1655
Chelsea	Comcast	City	Suffolk	35,177	1739
Cheshire	Spectrum	Town	Berkshire	3,235	1793
Chester	Comcast	Town	Hampden	1,337	1765
Chesterfield	Vacant	Town	Hampshire	1,222	1762
Chicopee	Spectrum	City	Hampden	55,298	1848
Chilmark	Comcast	Town	Dukes	866	1714
Clarksburg	Spectrum	Town	Berkshire	1,702	1798
Clinton	Comcast	Town	Worcester	13,606	1850
Cohasset	Comcast · Verizon	Town	Norfolk	7,542	1775
Colrain	Vacant	Town	Franklin	1,671	1761
Concord	Comcast	Town	Middlesex	17,668	1635
Conway	Comcast	Town	Franklin	1,897	1775
Cummington	Whip City Fiber	Town	Hampshire	872	1779
Dalton	Spectrum	Town	Berkshire	6,756	1784
Danvers	Comcast · Verizon	Town	Essex	26,493	1775
Dartmouth	Comcast	Town	Bristol	34,032	1664
Dedham	Comcast · RCN · Verizon	Town	Norfolk	24,729	1636
Deerfield	Comcast	Town	Franklin	5,125	1677
Dennis	Comcast	Town	Barnstable	14,207	1793
Dighton	Comcast	Town	Bristol	7,086	1712
Douglas	Spectrum	Town	Worcester	8,471	1775
Dover	Comcast · Verizon	Town	Norfolk	5,589	1836
Dracut	Comcast	Town	Middlesex	29,457	1701
Dudley	Spectrum	Town	Worcester	11,390	1732
Dunstable	Spectrum · Verizon	Town	Middlesex	3,179	1673
Duxbury	Comcast · Verizon	Town	Plymouth	15,059	1637
East Bridgewater	Comcast	Town	Plymouth	13,794	1823
East Brookfield	Spectrum	Town	Worcester	2,183	1920
East Longmeadow	Spectrum	Town	Hampden	15,720	1894
Eastham	Comcast	Town	Barnstable	4,956	1646
Easthampton	Spectrum	City	Hampshire	16,053	1809
Easton	Comcast · Verizon	Town	Bristol	23,112	1725
Edgartown	Comcast	Town	Dukes	4,067	1671
Egremont	Vacant	Town	Berkshire	1,225	1775
Erving	Comcast	Town	Franklin	1,800	1838
Essex	Comcast	Town	Essex	3,504	1819
Everett	Comcast · RCN	City	Middlesex	41,667	1870
Fairhaven	Comcast	Town	Bristol	15,873	1812
Fall River	Comcast	City	Bristol	88,857	1803
Falmouth	Comcast	Town	Barnstable	31,531	1686
Fitchburg	Comcast · Verizon	City	Worcester	40,318	1764
Florida	Vacant	Town	Berkshire	752	1805
Foxborough	Comcast · Verizon	Town	Norfolk	16,865	1778
Framingham	Comcast · RCN · Verizon	Town	Middlesex	68,318	1700
Franklin	Comcast · Verizon	City	Norfolk	31,635	1778
Freetown	Comcast	Town	Bristol	8,870	1683
Gardner	Comcast	City	Worcester	20,228	1785
Georgetown	Comcast · Verizon	Town	Essex	8,183	1838
Gill	Comcast	Town	Franklin	1,500	1793
Gloucester	Comcast	City	Essex	28,789	1623
Goshen	Vacant	Town	Hampshire	1,054	1781
Gosnold	Vacant	Town	Dukes	75	1864
Grafton	Spectrum · Verizon	Town	Worcester	17,765	1735
Granby	Comcast	Town	Hampshire	6,240	1768
Granville	Comcast	Town	Hampden	1,566	1775
Great Barrington	Spectrum	Town	Berkshire	7,104	1761
Greenfield	Comcast · GCET	City	Franklin	17,456	1775
Groton	Spectrum · Verizon	Town	Middlesex	10,646	1655
Groveland	Comcast	Town	Essex	6,459	1850
Hadley	Spectrum	Town	Hampshire	5,250	1661
Halifax	Comcast	Town	Plymouth	7,518	1734
Hamilton	Comcast · Verizon	Town	Essex	7,764	1793
Hampden	Spectrum	Town	Hampden	5,139	1878
Hancock	Vacant	Town	Berkshire	717	1776
Hanover	Comcast · Verizon	Town	Plymouth	13,879	1727
Hanson	Comcast	Town	Plymouth	10,209	1820
Hardwick	Comcast	Town	Worcester	2,990	1739
Harvard	Spectrum	Town	Worcester	6,520	1732
Harwich	Comcast	Town	Barnstable	12,243	1694
Hatfield	Comcast	Town	Hampshire	3,279	1670
Haverhill	Breezeline · Comcast	City	Essex	60,879	1641
Hawley	Vacant	Town	Franklin	337	1792
Heath	Vacant	Town	Franklin	706	1785
Hingham	Comcast · Verizon	Town	Plymouth	22,157	1635
Hinsdale	Spectrum	Town	Berkshire	2,032	1804
Holbrook	Comcast · Verizon	Town	Norfolk	10,791	1872
Holden	Spectrum	Town	Worcester	17,346	1741
Holland	Cox	Town	Hampden	2,481	1835
Holliston	Comcast · Verizon	Town	Middlesex	13,547	1724
Holyoke	Comcast · Holyoke Gas & Electric	City	Hampden	39,880	1850
Hopedale	Comcast · Verizon	Town	Worcester	5,911	1886
Hopkinton	Comcast · Verizon	Town	Middlesex	14,925	1715
Hubbardston	Spectrum	Town	Worcester	4,382	1775
Hudson	Comcast · Verizon	Town	Middlesex	19,063	1866
Hull	Comcast · Verizon	Town	Plymouth	10,293	1644
Huntington	Comcast	Town	Hampshire	2,180	1775
Ipswich	Comcast · Verizon	Town	Essex	13,175	1634
Kingston	Comcast · Verizon	Town	Plymouth	12,629	1726
Lakeville	Comcast · Verizon	Town	Plymouth	10,602	1853
Lancaster	Comcast	Town	Worcester	8,055	1653
Lanesborough	Spectrum	Town	Berkshire	3,091	1765
Lawrence	Comcast · Verizon	City	Essex	76,377	1847
Lee	Spectrum	Town	Berkshire	5,943	1777
Leicester	Spectrum	Town	Worcester	10,970	1714
Lenox	Spectrum	Town	Berkshire	5,025	1775
Leominster	Comcast · Verizon	City	Worcester	40,759	1740
Leverett	Vacant	Town	Franklin	1,851	1774
Lexington	Comcast · RCN · Verizon	Town	Middlesex	31,394	1713
Leyden	Vacant	Town	Franklin	711	1809
Lincoln	Comcast · Verizon	Town	Middlesex	6,362	1754
Littleton	Comcast · Verizon	Town	Middlesex	8,924	1715
Longmeadow	Comcast	Town	Hampden	15,784	1783
Lowell	Comcast	City	Middlesex	106,519	1826
Ludlow	Spectrum	Town	Hampden	21,103	1775
Lunenburg	Comcast	Town	Worcester	10,086	1728
Lynn	Comcast · Verizon	City	Essex	90,329	1629
Lynnfield	Comcast · Verizon	Town	Essex	11,596	1814
Malden	Comcast · Verizon	City	Middlesex	59,450	1649
Manchester-by-the-Sea	Comcast	Town	Essex	5,136	1645
Mansfield	Comcast · Verizon	Town	Bristol	23,184	1775
Marblehead	Comcast · Verizon	Town	Essex	19,808	1649
Marion	Comcast · Verizon	Town	Plymouth	4,907	1852
Marlborough	Comcast · Verizon	City	Middlesex	38,499	1660
Marshfield	Comcast · Verizon	Town	Plymouth	25,132	1640
Mashpee	Comcast	Town	Barnstable	14,006	1870
Mattapoisett	Comcast · Verizon	Town	Plymouth	6,045	1857
Maynard	Comcast · Verizon	Town	Middlesex	10,106	1871
Medfield	Comcast · Verizon	Town	Norfolk	12,024	1651
Medford	Comcast · Verizon	City	Middlesex	56,173	1630
Medway	Comcast · Verizon	Town	Norfolk	12,752	1713
Melrose	Comcast · Verizon	City	Middlesex	26,983	1850
Mendon	Comcast · Verizon	Town	Worcester	5,839	1667
Merrimac	Breezeline · Comcast	Town	Essex	6,338	1876
Methuen	Comcast · Verizon	City	Essex	47,255	1725
Middleborough	Comcast · Verizon	Town	Plymouth	23,116	1669
Middlefield	Vacant	Town	Hampshire	521	1783
Middleton	Comcast · Verizon	Town	Essex	8,987	1728
Milford	Comcast · Verizon	Town	Worcester	27,999	1780
Millbury	Spectrum · Verizon	Town	Worcester	13,261	1813
Millis	Comcast · Verizon	Town	Norfolk	7,891	1885
Millville	Spectrum	Town	Worcester	3,190	1916
Milton	Comcast · RCN	Town	Norfolk	27,003	1662
Monroe	Vacant	Town	Franklin	121	1822
Monson	Comcast	Town	Hampden	8,560	1775
Montague	Comcast	Town	Franklin	8,437	1775
Monterey	Vacant	Town	Berkshire	961	1847
Montgomery	Vacant	Town	Hampden	838	1780
Mount Washington	Vacant	Town	Berkshire	167	1779
Nahant	Comcast · Verizon	Town	Essex	3,410	1853
Nantucket	Comcast	Town	Nantucket	10,172	1671
Natick	Comcast · RCN · Verizon	Town	Middlesex	33,006	1781
Needham	Comcast · RCN · Verizon	Town	Norfolk	28,886	1711
New Ashford	Whip City Fiber	Town	Berkshire	228	1835
New Bedford	Comcast	City	Bristol	95,072	1787
New Braintree	Vacant	Town	Worcester	999	1775
New Marlborough	Vacant	Town	Berkshire	1,509	1775
New Salem	Whip City Fiber	Town	Franklin	990	1775
Newbury	Comcast	Town	Essex	6,666	1635
Newburyport	Comcast	City	Essex	17,416	1764
Newton	Comcast · RCN · Verizon	City	Middlesex	85,146	1688
Norfolk	Comcast · Verizon	Town	Norfolk	11,227	1870
North Adams	Spectrum	City	Berkshire	13,708	1878
North Andover	Comcast · Verizon	Town	Essex	28,352	1855
North Attleborough	Comcast · Verizon	Town	Bristol	28,712	1887
North Brookfield	Spectrum	Town	Worcester	4,680	1812
North Reading	Comcast · Verizon	Town	Middlesex	14,892	1853
Northampton	Comcast	City	Hampshire	28,549	1656
Northborough	Comcast · Verizon	Town	Worcester	14,155	1775
Northbridge	Spectrum	Town	Worcester	15,707	1775
Northfield	Comcast	Town	Franklin	3,032	1723
Norton	Comcast	Town	Bristol	19,031	1711
Norwell	Comcast · Verizon	Town	Plymouth	10,506	1849
Norwood	Comcast · Norwood Municipal · Verizon	Town	Norfolk	28,602	1872
Oak Bluffs	Comcast	Town	Dukes	4,527	1880
Oakham	Spectrum	Town	Worcester	1,902	1775
Orange	Spectrum	Town	Franklin	7,839	1810
Orleans	Comcast	Town	Barnstable	5,890	1797
Otis	Whip City Fiber	Town	Berkshire	1,612	1773
Oxford	Spectrum	Town	Worcester	13,709	1713
Palmer	Comcast	City	Hampden	12,140	1775
Paxton	Spectrum	Town	Worcester	4,806	1775
Peabody	Comcast	City	Essex	51,251	1868
Pelham	Comcast	Town	Hampshire	1,321	1743
Pembroke	Comcast	Town	Plymouth	17,837	1712
Pepperell	Spectrum	Town	Middlesex	11,497	1775
Peru	Vacant	Town	Berkshire	847	1771
Petersham	Vacant	Town	Worcester	1,234	1754
Phillipston	Comcast	Town	Worcester	1,682	1786
Pittsfield	Spectrum	City	Berkshire	44,737	1761
Plainfield	Whip City Fiber	Town	Hampshire	648	1807
Plainville	Comcast	Town	Norfolk	8,264	1905
Plymouth	Comcast · Verizon	Town	Plymouth	56,468	1620
Plympton	Comcast	Town	Plymouth	2,820	1707
Princeton	Spectrum	Town	Worcester	3,413	1771
Provincetown	Comcast	Town	Barnstable	2,942	1727
Quincy	Comcast	City	Norfolk	92,271	1792
Randolph	Comcast · Verizon	City	Norfolk	32,112	1793
Raynham	Comcast · Verizon	Town	Bristol	13,383	1731
Reading	Comcast · Verizon	Town	Middlesex	24,747	1644
Rehoboth	Comcast	Town	Bristol	11,608	1645
Revere	Comcast	City	Suffolk	51,755	1846
Richmond	Spectrum	Town	Berkshire	1,475	1765
Rochester	Comcast · Verizon	Town	Plymouth	5,232	1686
Rockland	Comcast · Verizon	Town	Plymouth	17,489	1874
Rockport	Comcast	Town	Essex	6,952	1840
Rowe	Whip City Fiber	Town	Franklin	393	1785
Rowley	Comcast · Verizon	Town	Essex	5,856	1639
Royalston	Vacant	Town	Worcester	1,258	1765
Russell	Russell Municipal	Town	Hampden	1,775	1792
Rutland	Spectrum	Town	Worcester	7,973	1713
Salem	Comcast	City	Essex	41,340	1626
Salisbury	Breezeline · Comcast	Town	Essex	8,283	1639
Sandisfield	Vacant	Town	Berkshire	915	1762
Sandwich	Comcast	Town	Barnstable	20,675	1638
Saugus	Comcast	Town	Essex	26,628	1815
Savoy	Vacant	Town	Berkshire	692	1797
Scituate	Comcast	Town	Plymouth	18,133	1636
Seekonk	Comcast	Town	Bristol	13,722	1812
Sharon	Comcast	Town	Norfolk	17,612	1775
Sheffield	Spectrum	Town	Berkshire	3,257	1733
Shelburne	Comcast	Town	Franklin	1,893	1775
Sherborn	Comcast · Verizon	Town	Middlesex	4,119	1674
Shirley	Comcast	Town	Middlesex	7,211	1775
Shrewsbury	Shrewsbury Municipal	Town	Worcester	35,608	1727
Shutesbury	Vacant	Town	Franklin	1,771	1761
Somerset	Comcast	Town	Bristol	18,165	1790
Somerville	Comcast · RCN	City	Middlesex	75,754	1842
South Hadley	Comcast	Town	Hampshire	17,514	1775
Southampton	Spectrum	Town	Hampshire	5,792	1775
Southborough	Spectrum · Verizon	Town	Worcester	9,767	1727
Southbridge	Spectrum	City	Worcester	16,719	1816
Southwick	Comcast	Town	Hampden	9,502	1775
Spencer	Spectrum	Town	Worcester	11,688	1775
Springfield	Comcast	City	Hampden	153,060	1636
Sterling	Comcast	Town	Worcester	7,808	1781
Stockbridge	Spectrum	Town	Berkshire	1,947	1739
Stoneham	Comcast · RCN · Verizon	Town	Middlesex	21,437	1725
Stoughton	Comcast · Verizon	Town	Norfolk	26,962	1726
Stow	Comcast · Verizon	Town	Middlesex	6,590	1683
Sturbridge	Spectrum	Town	Worcester	9,268	1738
Sudbury	Comcast · Verizon	Town	Middlesex	17,659	1639
Sunderland	Comcast	Town	Franklin	3,684	1714
Sutton	Spectrum · Verizon	Town	Worcester	8,963	1714
Swampscott	Comcast · Verizon	Town	Essex	13,787	1852
Swansea	Comcast	Town	Bristol	15,865	1667
Taunton	Comcast · Verizon	City	Bristol	55,874	1639
Templeton	Comcast	Town	Worcester	8,013	1762
Tewksbury	Comcast · Verizon	Town	Middlesex	28,961	1734
Tisbury	Comcast	Town	Dukes	3,949	1671
Tolland	Vacant	Town	Hampden	485	1810
Topsfield	Comcast · Verizon	Town	Essex	6,085	1650
Townsend	Comcast	Town	Middlesex	8,926	1732
Truro	Comcast	Town	Barnstable	2,003	1709
Tyngsborough	Comcast · Verizon	Town	Middlesex	11,292	1809
Tyringham	Vacant	Town	Berkshire	327	1762
Upton	Spectrum	Town	Worcester	7,542	1735
Uxbridge	Spectrum	Town	Worcester	13,457	1727
Wakefield	Comcast · RCN · Verizon	Town	Middlesex	24,932	1812
Wales	Spectrum	Town	Hampden	1,838	1762
Walpole	Comcast · Verizon	Town	Norfolk	24,070	1724
Waltham	Comcast · RCN · Verizon	City	Middlesex	60,632	1738
Ware	Comcast	Town	Hampshire	9,872	1775
Wareham	Comcast · Verizon	Town	Plymouth	21,822	1739
Warren	Comcast	Town	Worcester	5,135	1742
Warwick	Vacant	Town	Franklin	780	1763
Washington	Whip City Fiber	Town	Berkshire	538	1777
Watertown	Comcast · RCN	City	Middlesex	31,915	1630
Wayland	Comcast · Verizon	Town	Middlesex	12,994	1780
Webster	Spectrum	Town	Worcester	16,767	1832
Wellesley	Comcast · Verizon	Town	Norfolk	27,982	1881
Wellfleet	Comcast	Town	Barnstable	2,750	1775
Wendell	Vacant	Town	Franklin	848	1781
Wenham	Comcast · Verizon	Town	Essex	4,875	1643
West Boylston	Spectrum	Town	Worcester	7,669	1808
West Bridgewater	Comcast	Town	Plymouth	6,916	1822
West Brookfield	Spectrum	Town	Worcester	3,701	1848
West Newbury	Comcast · Verizon	Town	Essex	4,235	1819
West Springfield	Comcast	City	Hampden	28,391	1774
West Stockbridge	Spectrum	Town	Berkshire	1,306	1775
West Tisbury	Comcast	Town	Dukes	2,740	1892
Westborough	Spectrum · Verizon	Town	Worcester	18,272	1717
Westfield	Comcast · Whip City Fiber	City	Hampden	41,094	1669
Westford	Comcast · Verizon	Town	Middlesex	21,951	1729
Westhampton	Comcast	Town	Hampshire	1,607	1778
Westminster	Comcast	Town	Worcester	7,277	1770
Weston	Comcast · Verizon	Town	Middlesex	11,261	1713
Westport	Spectrum	Town	Bristol	15,532	1787
Westwood	Comcast · Verizon	Town	Norfolk	14,618	1897
Weymouth	Comcast	City	Norfolk	53,743	1635
Whately	Comcast	Town	Franklin	1,496	1771
Whitman	Comcast	Town	Plymouth	14,489	1875
Wilbraham	Spectrum	Town	Hampden	14,219	1763
Williamsburg	Comcast	Town	Hampshire	2,482	1775
Williamstown	Spectrum	Town	Berkshire	7,754	1765
Wilmington	Comcast · Verizon	Town	Middlesex	22,325	1730
Winchendon	Comcast	Town	Worcester	10,300	1764
Winchester	Comcast · Verizon	Town	Middlesex	21,374	1850
Windsor	Vacant	Town	Berkshire	899	1771
Winthrop	Comcast	City	Suffolk	17,497	1852
Woburn	Comcast · RCN · Verizon	City	Middlesex	38,120	1642
Worcester	Spectrum	City	Worcester	181,045	1684
Worthington	Vacant	Town	Hampshire	1,156	1768
Wrentham	Comcast · Verizon	Town	Norfolk	10,955	1673
Yarmouth	Comcast	Town	Barnstable	23,793	1639

== Notes ==
- MAP, Cable Television Providers, by Municipality
- Subscriber statistics in the state, Cable Television Subscriber statistics, by Municipality
- Status of communities as of November 2019
- Cable Television Licenses, Department of Telecommunications and Cable, (Massachusetts) Consumer Affairs & Business Regulation (OCABR) office.
- Cashing in on Cable Warning Flags for Local Government, October 2001, The Beacon Hill Institute of Suffolk University

== See also ==
- Administrative divisions of Massachusetts
- List of counties in Massachusetts
- List of cities in Massachusetts
- List of towns in Massachusetts
- List of villages in Massachusetts
- List of United States wireless communications service providers
- Cable television in the United States
- List of multiple-system operators
- List of United States over-the-air television networks
- List of United States cable and satellite television networks
- Satellite television in the United States
