= Marsh Marshall =

American economist

- Education: Tufts University, Stanford University, Oxford University
- Occupations: Economist, Venture Capitalist and Financial Engineering Executive

Marsh Marshall is an American economist, venture capital and hedge fund manager, and television producer. He is the author of "Organizations and Growth in Rural China", academic and newspaper articles on China's economy and on venture capital investing. He is currently Chief Executive Officer at the quantitative hedge fund, Periwinkle Trading LLC, and is writing a book on market planning.

== Early life ==
Marshall was born in 1953 and raised in Washington DC, where he graduated from Georgetown Preparatory School in 1971. In 1975, he earned a bachelor's degree in history from Tufts University (magna cum laude); a 1977 master's degree in development economics from Stanford University, and a 1983 doctorate degree in economics from Oxford University, where he was a Tutor in Economics at Magdalen College. His doctoral thesis focused on the relationship between institutions and economic growth. In July 1979, Marshall was a member of a delegation of six Oxford and Cambridge economists invited by the Chinese Academy of Social Science to discuss economic reforms with China's leader, Deng Xiaoping. In a 1979 article, Marshall presented evidence that the apparent success of Mao Zedong's agricultural model, Dazhai, was a fraud. In 1981, China's post-Mao leadership acknowledged the fraud in Beijing Review.

== Business career ==
In 1993-1995 Marshall led a Silicon Valley–based team of designers and engineers for Bell Atlantic in the development of user interfaces and electronic program guides for video-on-demand service, for which Marshall was issued a US patent. In 1996, Marshall was subsequently appointed vice president at Tele-TV, a partnership of Bell Atlantic, NYNEX and Pacific Bell. In 1998, Marshall was appointed Chief Operating Officer, IXI Corporation, where he helped establish a data modeling network of $10 trillion in directly measured financial assets from large mutual funds, banks, and insurance companies. IXI was chaired by Jay Regan, co-founder (with mathematician Ed Thorpe) of Princeton-Newport, one of the first systematic statistical arbitrage hedge funds. After the 2009 sale of IXI to Equifax (NYSE: EFX), Marshall became President of the IXI Digital division of Equifax. Prior to joining IXI, Marshall was General Partner at a $90 million, Rothschild-sponsored venture capital firm, ECentury Capital, where he made equity and debt investments in software, semiconductor, data science and digital media companies, and served on eight boards.

Marshall currently serves as Chief Executive Officer at the statistical arbitrage, systematic hedge fund Periwinkle Trading LLC, founded by the late Scott Smallwood, former managing director at Morgan Stanley's quantitative hedge fund, Process Driven Trading (PDT). Periwinkle's statistical arbitrage trading strategies focus on the systematic trading of Chinese equities using machine learning and neural network methodologies.

In 2011, Marshall was appointed chairman of the Board of Bluecava, a California software and digital device data company. He was a board director of Linkable Networks and a senior adviser at I2 Capital

== Film and television career ==
Marshall's television career was centered at the British Broadcasting Corporation in London, where from 1983 to 1990 he was trained in news and current affairs production. Marshall was a staff producer at British Broadcasting Corporation for five years and produced and directed more than a dozen major programs and films. His filmography includes Life After Debt for BBC Panorama; Moneylenders for PBS Frontline; On Course for War (for Panorama); Czech Mate (with BBC Foreign Affairs Editor John Simpson); Review of the Year 1989 with Jonathan Dimbleby, a 90-minute Christmas season film for BBC1, In 1993, he directed a BBC drama, "War with America", a special effects film set in the future, with a cast of British actors.

== Filmography ==
- "War with America" 1993 (Director)
- "Sleepwalking to War?" 1990 (Producer)
- "Czech-mate: Inside the Revolution" 1990, (Producer)
- "Conference Day Labor 89" 1989 (Producer)
- "Conference Day Sdp" 89" 1989 (Producer)
- "Conference Day Conservatives 89" 1989 (Producer)
- "Walking Tall" 1988 (Associate Producer)
- "Kilroy" 1988 (Producer)
- "On Course for War" 1984 (Associate Producer)
- "Life after Debt" 1983 (Producer)
