= Big Ten Icons =

- Genre: Sports documentary
- Narrated by: Keith Jackson
- Country of origin: United States
- Original language: English
- No. of episodes: 32

Production
- Running time: 30 minutes

Original release
- Network: Big Ten Network
- Release: September 18, 2010 – 2012

Big Ten Icons is a television show in the Big Ten Network that showcases outstanding Big Ten athletes and coaches. Its subjects range over a wide period of time and include all sports.

The series began in the fall of 2010 and featured 20 episodes, each one featuring a different Big Ten college athlete counting down in order.

The next season, Big Ten Icons: The Coaches, began in the fall of 2011 and profiled 12 coaches, one from each school, with several from football. Some of the coaches included Nebraska's Tom Osborne, Penn State's Joe Paterno, Iowa's Dan Gable and Michigan's Bo Schembechler.

The series is narrated by college sports broadcaster Keith Jackson.

== Episodes ==
Season 1:

Rank	Athlete	Original air date
20	Charles Woodson	2010
19	Suzy Favor-Hamilton	2010
18	Jack Nicklaus	2010
17	Steve Alford	2010
16	John Cappelletti	2010
15	Dave Winfield	2010
14	Otto Graham	2010
13	Ron Dayne	2010
12	John Wooden	2010
11	Mark Spitz	2010
10	Isiah Thomas	2010
9	Rick Mount	2011
6	Jerry Lucas	2011
7	Nile Kinnick	2011
6	Dick Butkus	2011
5	Tom Harmon	2011
4	Archie Griffin	2011
3	Jesse Owens	2011
2	Magic Johnson	2011
1	Red Grange	March 11, 2011

== Sponsors ==
Discover Card is the presenting sponsor of the series.
