= Sonic (ISP) =

American telco and ISP

Sonic.net, LLC
- Type: Private
- Industry: Internet and Telecommunication
- Founded: September 1994
- Founders: Dane Jasper; Scott Doty
- Headquarters: Santa Rosa, California, United States
- Area served: California; Dallas, Texas
- Key people: Dane Jasper (Founder and Board Member); Nathan Patrick (CEO)
- Website: www.sonic.com

Sonic is a telecommunications company and internet service provider based in Santa Rosa, California, acting as a competitive local exchange carrier in the San Francisco Bay Area, Sacramento, Los Angeles, and Dallas. They are most well known for defending privacy.

== History ==
Sonic began as an effort to bring network connectivity and Internet access to staff and students at the campus of Santa Rosa Junior College. In 1994, Sonic began formal Internet operations by way of a partnership between Dane Jasper and Scott Doty, both of whom had worked on the network at the college. In 1995, Sonic moved into its downtown Santa Rosa location.

In 2011, after becoming concerned about increasing requests for users' data by private law firms, mostly related to copyright infringement involving pornography, Sonic cut the time it stores logs of user activity to two weeks.

Later in 2011, the US federal government forced Sonic and Google to provide e-mail addresses of people who had corresponded with WikiLeaks volunteer and Tor developer Jacob Appelbaum. Sonic and Google fought the secret court order, which then-CEO Dane Jasper characterized as "rather expensive, but the right thing to do," and the court agreed to lift the seal on the Sonic order to give Appelbaum a copy of it.

In 2012, Jasper told TorrentFreak that Sonic would not be participating in the so-called "six strikes" plan, in which major US internet service providers would begin to warn and punish people suspected of infringing copyrights, saying that ISPs are not equipped to police the actions of individuals, and that the Motion Picture Association of America (MPAA) and Recording Industry Association of America (RIAA) had not invited small, independent ISPs to participate.

In 2013, Sonic's then-CEO Dane Jasper made comments about expanding into Los Angeles.

In late 2013, Sonic began making fiber-optic connections to its existing data network passing 700 homes in Sebastopol.

In late 2014, Sonic.net rebranded as Sonic, after acquiring sonic.com and the @sonic Twitter handle.

In April 2015, the company partnered with AT&T to expand service, using fiber-to-the-node. Due to this partnership, Sonic customers connected via that service are required to comply with AT&T's upstream policies, and may be subject to government spying. Sonic customers can utilize a VPN to avoid AT&T policies, and Sonic requires a lawful court order for any information requested by law enforcement.

In December 2018, Sonic announced a partnership with Eero—now owned by Amazon—creator of the first whole-home WiFi mesh system, to improve WiFi connectivity across the entire home.

== Company Information ==
Sonic has 175 employees and generates $21,000,000 annually in a 2009 fiscal report. Four million people across the San Francisco Bay Area are using Sonic.net services. The company's CEO Nathan Patrick was previously the CTO.

== Services ==
Sonic offers a number of services including:

- 10 Gigabit Fiber – Residential product. Sonic's XGS-PON implementation uses many components of their Gigabit Fiber offering: they use a transition box to terminate their fiber between their drop cable and customers', use of an ONT and a variety of residential gateways. Sonic only rents the eero Max 7 at $20/month as the only gateway that supports 10 gigabit; however, customers are free to provide their own gateway to avoid any monthly equipment rental fee. As of 2024, Sonic has focused on building only 10 Gigabit service and there is no longer a telephone requirement for 10 gigabit service. Per one of their sales people, the OLT splits each fiber to 32 customers.
- Gigabit Fiber – Combined voice (VoIP) and data service offering up to 1,000 Mbit/s per line using Passive Optical Networking, with unlimited nationwide land line voice. Sonic has full control of the line: subscribers are on Sonic's IP space. Available in select markets, currently only Northern California locations.
- Fusion ADSL2+ – Combined voice (POTS) and data service offering up to 20 Mbit/s per line, with unlimited nationwide land line voice. Sonic has full control of the line: subscribers are on Sonic's IP space.
- Fusion VDSL2 – Combined voice (POTS) and data service offering up to 75 Mbit/s with the same limitations as Fusion ADSL2+. This subscription is served from a CO where Sonic has full control of the line cards and therefore remove any artificial limitation in speed that a subscriber can get. The requirement for getting this service is an individual has to be relatively close to the CO, up to 4000 feet. X2 is also available which will roughly double the speed.
- Fusion FTTN (VDSL2) and Fusion IP Broadband – Combined voice (VoIP) and data service offering from 20 Mbit/s up to 75 Mbit/s through bonding (X2), with unlimited nationwide land line voice. This is resold AT&T Internet. Single pair connection is limited to 50 Mbit/s even if the line is capable of more than that; bonded pair is limited to 75 Mbit/s. Sonic has some control of the line such as not enforcing transfer caps, but customers are on AT&T's IP space. VoIP connection defaults to G.729ab and uses less than 50 Kbps.
- FlexLink – Midband Ethernet service offering symmetric speeds from 1.5 Mbit/s to 500 Mbit/s.
- AT&T DSL – ADSL service delivered over an AT&T voice line. This service is obsolete and Sonic is no longer accepting legacy ADSL1 subscriptions.
- Hosting – Website hosting services.
- Colocation – Datacenter colocation in Santa Rosa, CA.

== See also ==
- List of broadband providers in the United States
- ITU G.992.5
