= Limit of Vision =

2001 novel by Linda Nagata

- Author: Linda Nagata
- Cover artist: Stephen Youll
- Language: English
- Genre: Science fiction
- Publisher: Tor Books
- Publication date: 2001
- Publication place: United States
- Media type: Print (hardback & paperback)
- Pages: 352
- ISBN: 0-7653-4211-1
- OCLC: 50102858

Limit of Vision is a 2001 science fiction book by American writer Linda Nagata. Like many of Nagata's novels, it contains themes of nanotechnology and genetic engineering, as well as government and corporate corruption, in this case as suppressors of positive and liberating transhumanizing technology.

Limit of Vision is about a rogue colony of artificial, independently viable neural cells called asterids, which escape from containment aboard a corporate research lab in low Earth orbit. Plummeting to Earth, the colony's habitat lands off the coast of Vietnam, where it is picked up by a freelance journalist. The journalist is helped by a group of young children living under the protection of a nearly sentient computer program, who see an opportunity to benefit by cooperating with the asterids in a form of symbiosis. The corporate lab, Equasys, joins with the UN to eradicate the asterids.

== Plot summary ==
Virgil Copeland and Randall Panwar are forced to present a project review to the senior staff of Equatorial Systems, and their fellow scientist Gabrielle Villanti fails to attend. Panwar struggles with the presentation, in which they present their research about asterids (artificial neurons) known as LOVs. Although LOVs showed promise in initial experiments, the enhanced intelligence of the test animals was offset by the uncontrolled growth of the LOVs, which eventually killed their hosts. LOVs were therefore made dependent on two amino acids: nopaline for metabolism and octopine for reproduction. In the second phase of the experiment, the LOVs were encased in silicate shells. These LOVs were able to safely interact with the test animals, but an unrelated incident at a rival biotechnology company prompted a government crackdown, and the LOVs were exported to the Hammer, a space station in low Earth orbit.

Panwar's presentation is interrupted by news of an incident at the lab. Gabrielle, Panwar, and Virgil had illegally implanted LOV clusters on their foreheads to communicate with the LOV colonies in their care, and Gabrielle had entered a fugue state and died of exhaustion while connected to their latest experimental subject. Their administrators discover Virgil attempting to surreptitiously remove the LOVs from Gabrielle's corpse, and the two surviving scientists are put into quarantine. However, the LOV colony is more intelligent and resourceful than anticipated, and overcomes several obstacles to colonize key areas of the Hammer. When it learns what has happened, it takes control of several drones and severs the lab module from the space station.

Ela Suvanatat is a freelance journalist doing a story on struggling fishing villages in Vietnam when the Equasys lab module crashes offshore. Although it is quickly declared off-limits by the government, Ela hires a boat and visits the crash site. She is able to scoop up a few stray LOVs which have survived atmospheric reentry and return to shore before the military arrives and cordons off the site.

Fleeing from military patrols through marshland, Ela comes into contact with the Roi Nuoc, a group of children under the care of a nearly sentient computer program named Mother Tiger. The Roi Nuoc take her to one of their benefactors, a businessman named Ky Xuan Nguyen. At his house, Ela discovers that the packet of LOVs has torn and most of them are missing, but a few LOVs are still lodged in her forehead.

Meanwhile, Virgil and Panwar attempt to escape from quarantine, but Panwar is gunned down and Virgil is only just able to reach Panwar's one-man automated submarine. Virgil soon receives a message from Ela, who is worried that her LOVs seem to be dying. He tells her that crown galls on some plants might contain nopaline, and orders her a supply of both nopaline and octopine tablets from a chemical supply company.

Ela is forced to flee her safe house when the military begins a house-to-house search, but she stops to gather crown galls and then asks one of the Roi Nuoc to lead her back to the pool where she took shelter after swimming ashore. At the pool, Ela puts half of her crown galls into the mud, hoping to save any LOVs which had reached the water.

== Critical reception ==
The Gazette wrote that Limit of Vision "fails to live up to [Nagata's] usual standards" and that the plot left too many questions. The work was however praised by Publishers Weekly and the Science Fiction Chronicle, which wrote that it established Nagata as "one of the better hard SF writers working in the field."
