= Linda Nagata =

American writer (born 1960)

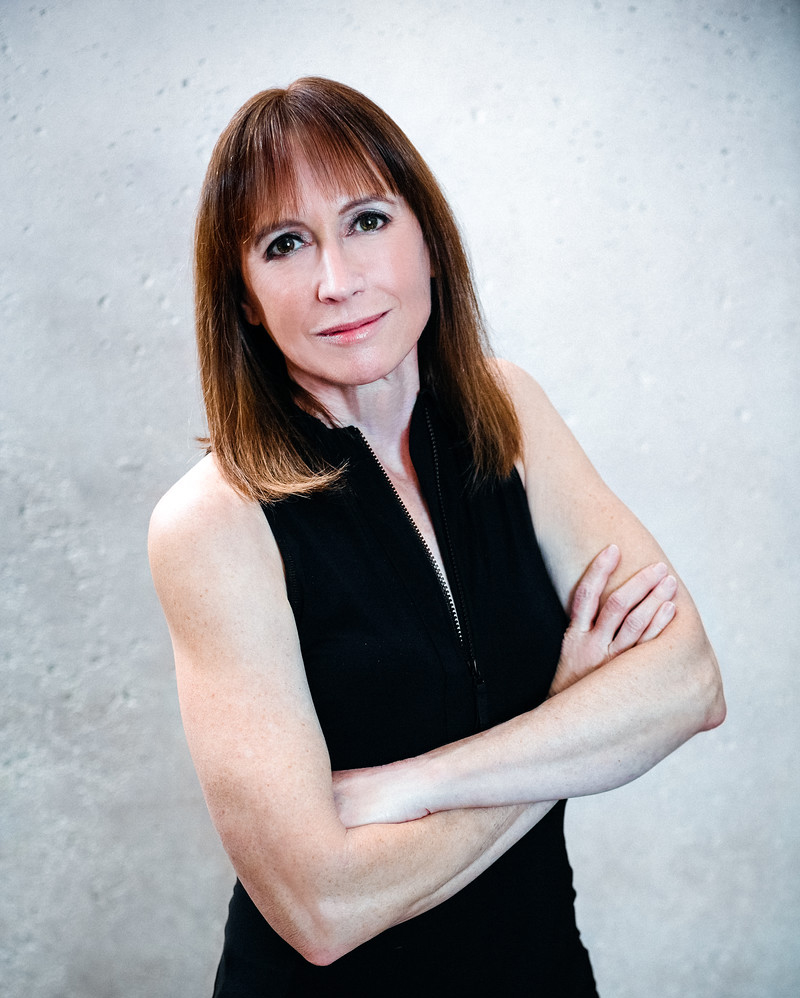
- Author Linda Nagata in 2015
- Born: Linda Webb; November 7, 1960 (age 65); San Diego, California, U.S.
- Education: University of Hawaiʻi at Mānoa
- Writing career
- Pen name: Trey Shiels
- Genres: Science fiction, fantasy

Linda Nagata (born November 7, 1960, in San Diego, California) is a Hawaii-based American author of speculative fiction, science fiction, and fantasy novels, novellas, and short stories. Her novella Goddesses was the first online publication to win the Nebula Award. She frequently writes in the Nanopunk genre, which features nanotechnology and the integration of advanced computing with the human brain.

== Life and career ==
Nagata was born in San Diego and moved with her family to Oahu, Hawai'i when she was ten years old. She earned a bachelor's degree in zoology from the University of Hawaiʻi at Mānoa before moving to the island of Maui, where she still lives with her family.

Nagata began writing after graduating from university, and published her first short story in 1987. She now publishes under her independent imprint, Mythic Island Press, LLC., which publishes e-books and trade paperbacks. She is perhaps most recognized for her Nanotech Succession series.

== Bibliography ==
=== Novels ===
- The Nanotech Succession
  - Tech-Heaven (1995)
  - The Bohr Maker (1995)
  - Deception Well (1997)
  - Vast (1998)
  - Inverted Frontier
    - Edges (2019)
    - Silver (2019)
    - Needle (2022)
    - Blade (2024)
- Limit of Vision (2001)
- Memory (2003)
- Skye Object 3270a (2011)
- Stories of the Puzzle Lands (as Trey Shiels)
  - The Dread Hammer (2011) (As Trey Shiels)
  - Hepen the Watcher (2012)
- The Red
  - The Red: First Light (2013)
  - The Trials (2015)
  - Going Dark (2015)
- The Last Good Man (2017)
- Pacific Storm (2020)
- The Wild Trilogy
  - The Snow Chanter (2021)
  - The Long War (2021)
  - Days of Storm (2021)

=== Short fiction ===
==== Collections ====
- Goddesses and Other Stories (2011)
- Two Stories: Nahiku West & Nightside on Callisto (2013)
- Light and Shadow: Eight Short Stories (2016)

==== List of stories ====
Title	Year	First published	Reprinted/collected	Notes
Nightside on Callisto	2012	Lightspeed 24 (May 2012)		
A Moment Before It Struck	2012	Lightspeed 27 (August 2012)		
Through Your Eyes	2013	Asimov's Science Fiction 37/4-5 (Apr–May 2013)		
Out in the Dark	2013	Analog 133/6 (June 2013)		
Halfway Home	2013	Nightmare Magazine 12 (September 2013)		
Codename: Delphi	2014	Lightspeed 47 (April 2014)		
Attitude	2014	Reach for Infinity (anthology, May 2014)		
Light and Shadow	2014	War Stories: New Military Science Fiction (anthology, August 2014)		
The Way Home	2015	Operation Arcana (anthology, March 2015)		
Region Five	2017	Infinite Stars (anthology, October 2017)		

== Awards ==
- Locus Award for Best First Novel for The Bohr Maker, 1996.
- Nebula Award for Best Novella for Goddesses, 2000.
