= Americast =

- Company type: formerly: joint venture
- Founded: 1996; 30 years ago
- Defunct: 2003; 23 years ago
- Headquarters: Los Angeles, California, United States
- Key people: Stephen Weiswasser
- Owner: SBC; BellSouth Corp. Ameritech Corp. GTE Corp. (later Verizon Communications); SNET; Disney Televenture

Americast (stylized americast) was a cable alternative broadcast joint venture of five telephone companies: SBC, BellSouth Corporation, Ameritech Corporation, GTE Corporation (later part of Verizon by 2000) and SNET. The Walt Disney Company's Disney Televenture subsidiary was a programming partner. No standard delivery technologies was chosen for Americast with cable, direct-broadcast satellite and microwave as options for partner companies to use.

== History ==
Americast was founded in early 1996 by SBC, BellSouth, Ameritech and GTE. Southern New England Telecommunications later joined Americast in June 1996.

In August 1996, Americast made an order with Zenith Electronics for $1 billion worth of digital set-top boxes. In July 1997, the company eliminated its programming and marketing departments outsourcing to Disney Televenture. By this time, Ameritech had built Americast systems in 29 locations.

By 2000, the Americast system was considered to be too costly to run. Ameritech owner, SBC, put Ameritech's Americast unit up for sale in early 2000. SNET was expected to discontinue the Americast service in Connecticut in 2001. In May 2001, Ameritech's Americast unit was sold to Wide Open West, LLC. Right before Americast was discontinued, it was available in the following areas, among others: Cerritos, CA (a suburb of Los Angeles), Ventura County, CA, Hartford, New Haven, Chicago, Columbus, suburban Cleveland, suburban Detroit, Atlanta, Jacksonville, Honolulu (Oahu), New Orleans, Orlando, Miami, Vestavia Hills, AL (a suburb of Birmingham), and the Tampa Bay Area of Florida. Verizon (formerly GTE) sold their cable systems to Knology in 2003.

== See also ==
- Tele-TV - completing telephone company joint venture
- GTE mainStreet - another GTE television venture
- DirecTV
- Dish Network
