= Wildlife Jams =

Wildlife Jams is a half-hour educational television program that focuses on how animals behave in the wild and is targeted to teenage viewers. The program is narrated and also provides music from critically acclaimed jazz musicians.

Wildlife Jams presents information featuring a wide variety of animal species, including fish, reptiles, birds, and land mammals. Certain episodes investigate certain types of animals, including horses ("Horsing Around"), dolphins ("Dolphins"), tortoises ("Slow and Steady in the Shell") and apes ("Apes"). Other episodes examine animal topics relevant to many species, such as "Animal Communication", "Animal Adaptation", and "Swimming". The narrative guides viewers through a wealth of information, but also frequently allows space for them to draw their own observations and conclusions based on the facts presented.

Wildlife Jams also promotes awareness and responsibility toward wildlife issues, such as endangered species, threatened habitats, and wildlife conservation.

The show is syndicated to television stations nationwide. And until its October 1, 2007 closure, it was also seen on The Tube Music Network as part of federally mandated E/I programming requirements.
