= Vast (novel) =

1998 novel by Linda Nagata

- Author: Linda Nagata
- Language: English
- Genre: Science fiction
- Publisher: Bantam Spectra
- Publication date: 1998
- Publication place: United States
- Media type: Print (Paperback)
- Pages: 403

Vast is a science fiction novel by Linda Nagata, part of her loosely connected "Nanotech Succession" sequence.

== Background ==
The main characters of Vast are the crew and passengers of the Null Boundary, who are fleeing from the alien Chenzeme. The Chenzeme, using the "cult virus" and other, more conventional, weapons have destroyed much of human-occupied space, leaving the inhabitants of the Null Boundary to attempt to discover why.

While Vast is a standalone novel, there are links to The Bohr Maker, Tech-Heaven and Deception Well, primarily in the form of two shared technological innovations: advanced nanotechnology and "ghosts", a name given to electronically preserved human memories and personalities.

== Literary significance and reception ==
SF Site gave the novel a positive review, commenting on the balance between the relatively straightforward plotline and the complex character interaction.

John Clute, in The Encyclopedia of Science Fiction, described the "Deception Well" sub-sequence (comprising Deception Well and Vast) as "an immensely complex tale," drawing comparisons with the work of Olaf Stapledon and Larry Niven.

Alastair Reynolds described Vast as "one of the most enjoyable SF books I've read in the last 12 years" and noted its influence on his own novels, particularly Redemption Ark and House of Suns.
