= Bluepeak =

- Type: Private
- Industry: Telecommunications
- Founded: 2014
- Headquarters: Sikeston, Missouri, United States
- Key people: James M. Gleason, Chief Executive Officer and President
- Products: Cable television, broadband Internet, landline telephone
- Website: www.vastbroadband.com (Defunct) www.mybluepeak.com

Bluepeak (formerly known as Vast Broadband) is a cable and internet company serving South Dakota and southwestern Minnesota, more specifically the communities of Sioux Falls, Rapid City, Spearfish, Luverne, Marshall, Watertown, Vermillion, Sturgis, Storm Lake, Yankton, Worthington, Tea and Belle Fourche among others. Vast Broadband is privately held by Clarity Telecom.

== History ==
Vast Broadband was formed in 2014 after the close of a deal in which Vast acquired cable systems from WOW! in South Dakota, Minnesota and Iowa, which WOW! had picked up through its acquisition of Knology in 2012. The deal left Vast serving approximately 293,000 residential and business customers making it the 34th largest cable company in the United States. Vast's corporate team would be largely made up of that of Clarity Telecom.

In early 2015, Vast began making major network upgrades increasing internet speeds and adding more channels to their customers this would be the beginning of Vast trying to differentiate itself from WOW!'s products and services.

Vast Broadband was purchased by GI Partners from Pamlico Capital and Oak Hill Capital for an undisclosed amount in 2020. Vast completed its rebrand to Bluepeak in June 2022. By 2022 had Bluepeak expanded to Casper, Wyoming, and was expected to launch in Cheyenne, Wyoming.

== Internet availability by state ==
State	Population Covered by Vast Broadband
Minnesota	45,389
South Dakota	236,204
Wyoming	1,000–70,000
Oklahoma	12,000
