= Tele-TV =

American media and technology company

- Industry: Interactive TV
- Founded: 1995
- Defunct: 1997
- Headquarters: Los Angeles, Washington DC, San Francisco, and New York City, United States
- Owner: Bell Atlantic, Pacific Telesis, NYNEX, CAA

Tele-TV (also known as Galaxy-TV and Pacific Bell Digital TV) was a media and technology company formed by Bell Atlantic, NYNEX, Pacific Telesis, and Creative Artists Agency in February 1995. The company, based in Reston, Virginia, USA, set out to design a pioneering interactive TV service with a set-top box that would allow customers to view video on demand over copper phone wires. Thomson Consumer Electronics was to build the set-top boxes. Ex-CBS chief and former president of Sony Howard Stringer was hired as CEO, with ex-Fox executive Sandy Grushow as president. Michael Ovitz, then head of CAA, was to play a role as dealmaker between Hollywood and the company. The company spent US$500 million before halting operations in early 1997, although some subscribers had services through the end of 2001.

Stargazer was the initial project, started in 1994 by Bell Atlantic's CEO Raymond W. Smith, a VOD (video on demand) market trial which successfully launched in 1995 - the world's first commercial VOD service - with 1,000 Virginia households. This pioneering interactive research, data and design became the foundation for the Tele-TV service. At the time, Bell Atlantic CEO Ray Smith stated, "Before the communications industry is through, your computer will speak, your TV will listen, and your telephone will show you pictures."

Tele-TV was originally intended to feed programming content to the video systems the Baby Bells were planning in the early 1990s, but the venture lost much of its Bell company support when the 1996 Telecommunications Act distracted them with the possibility of a much more lucrative revenue stream - long-distance service.

The design and identity of the Tele-TV service was completed by 1996 - creative director Morgan Almeida and executive producer Peter Stonier had led global teams (English & Pockett, Pittard Sullivan Fitzgerald, PmCD ) to brand the service and design graphical user interfaces for interactive program guides. These pioneering interfaces won several patents and numerous major interactive awards. Michael Bavaro was the senior designer and director and developed the promotional Galaxy channel. However, the project was impacted by technical challenges, increasing costs, and unanticipated market changes - primarily that the Internet took off faster than fiber-optic TV systems—and so the three Baby Bells shut the venture down. They found entering the long-distance market much more appealing than promoting interactive TV. In the end, only Pacific Bell successfully launched a service, with Bell Atlantic and NYNEX (who had merged) not having established systems outside test markets. Pacific Bell's system was via wireless cable and was eventually sold to and operated by an outside company until shutting down in 2001.

== See also ==
- Americast - rival phone company programming venture
- DirecTV - Tele-TV boxes utilized boxes similar to that of RCA-brand DirecTV boxes (both were built by Thomson)
