= Verizon Fios =

American fiber provider

- Verizon Fios logo, 2015-2024
- Type: Subsidiary
- Industry: TV, Internet, & phone
- Founded: September 22, 2004; 22 years ago Keller, Texas, U.S.
- Headquarters: New York City, New York, U.S.
- Area served: United States
- Parent: Verizon Communications
- Divisions: JuniorNet

Verizon Fios is a bundled Internet access, telephone, and television service provided by Verizon Communications that operates over a fiber-optical network within the United States.

== History ==
=== Early development (1995–1996) ===
The early stages of Fios began when Bell Atlantic (now Verizon Communications) was testing its video service "Stargazer" in 1995. This was the first commercial video on demand (VOD) service, which was tested for 1,000 homes in Northern Virginia. During this time there were talks of developing a fiber optic-based service. In 1996, VP of Programming Bob Townsend told the Baltimore Sun that Stargazer would be "folded into (Bell Atlantic's) deployment of fiber to the curb."

=== Launch and expansion (2005–2010) ===
In September 2005, Verizon Communications began offering a fiber optic digital television service, which became available for 9,000 customers in Keller, Texas. Called Fios TV, the service aimed to replace copper wires with optical fibers. By August 2006, Fios TV was available in parts of seven states.

=== Stable footprint (2010–present) ===
In March 2010, Verizon announced that it was winding down its Fios expansion, concentrating on completing its network in areas that already had Fios franchises but were not deploying to new areas, which included the cities of Baltimore and Boston, which had not yet secured municipal franchise agreements. Some viewed the halt in expansion as a violation of Verizon's agreements with some municipalities and states, since Verizon has collected revenue to deploy infrastructure upgrades that never occurred.

In New Jersey, Verizon collected $15 billion in fees from customers and tax subsidies in exchange for promising fiber optic broadband for the whole state. The New Jersey state government altered the deal in 2014 to allow Verizon to substitute wireless Internet access to fulfill its promise instead. Critics pointed out that wireless Internet was slower and less reliable.

== Television ==
Fios TV is one of three services offered by Verizon Fios. Fios TV uses QAM technology to deliver signals to a customer's property using its fiber optic cables. At the home, the optical network terminal turns the signal into a radio frequency signal that can be used on a home's existing coaxial cables, feeding the signal to a set-top box (STB). Fios is also actively moving to streaming on Fios TV Plus, although their fiber based television is still popular.

For traditional Fios TV on QAM, they use set top boxes made by Arris and historically Cisco and Motorola, such as the VMS 1100 box, or the newer more IPTV based box, the Fios TV One

== Internet ==
Fios Internet was the first service offered under Verizon's Fios brand, and is one of three of the product line's current offerings. The broadband Internet service initially launched in Keller, Texas, in 2004, a year before Fios TV was available.

== Telephone ==
In addition to its TV and Internet services, the company also has a voice over IP service via its fiber-optic network, Fios Digital Voice. The service initially launched in Virginia and Maryland in September 2008 and eventually fully replaced an earlier service, VoiceWing, which Verizon offered from 2004 to early 2009.

While Verizon also offers plain old telephone service (POTS), it has been reported in various markets that Verizon physically disconnected the copper lines for copper-line phone service at the time that Fios was installed.

== Criticism ==
On March 13, 2017, Verizon was sued by the City of New York for numerous violations of its agreements with the city, which required the provider to pass a fiber-optic network in "underground conduit, along above-ground utility poles, or otherwise—in front of (or behind) each residential building" in the city by June 30, 2014, and to provide access to officials in their deployment database within thirty days. In the lawsuit before the New York Supreme Court, The city identified approximately one million households that were not yet served by the network, including a larger number of outstanding requests than those claimed by Verizon, along with allegations that Verizon refused to install Fios in certain areas, that it routinely failed to make service available to "tens of thousands" of customers within the time it had agreed to, that it required multi-family residential units to enter into bulk purchases or exclusivity deals to receive service promptly or at all, a violation of FCC policy.

According to several property managers, Verizon refused to meet its obligations unless they entered into such deals. One additionally claimed Verizon had doubled their price per apartment unit within two years. City officials found that in the case of 37% of the properties examined, Verizon failed to meet its obligations per the agreement. Critics argued that such exclusive deals could negatively impact consumers by reducing their choices and hindering the growth of broadband access in the area.

In response, Verizon claimed it would reinforce its policies with employees to ensure this would not be an issue moving forward and questioned the investigation's integrity, although the company was never afforded the opportunity to respond to the allegations.

In November 2020, Verizon settled the lawsuit with New York City, whereby the company agreed to bring Fios to 500,000 households in the city. Verizon was required to target its fiber upgrades in low-income areas, including parts of the Bronx, Brooklyn, Manhattan, and Queens. Verizon also claimed that they would be required to make paid resident service available usually within seven days. In the settlement, Verizon did not admit wrongdoing.

=== Carriage disputes ===
==== The Weather Channel carriage dispute ====
On March 10, 2015, at midnight EDT, The Weather Channel and its sister network, Weatherscan, were pulled from Verizon Fios after the two parties were unable to come to terms on a new carriage agreement. The services have respectively been replaced by the AccuWeather Network (which launched on March 13) and a widget provided by Fios featuring forecast content provided by WeatherBug. No public announcement was made regarding the removal until over 12 hours after TWC and Weatherscan were pulled. The Weather Channel offered a less expensive deal to Verizon Fios, which rejected the offer. Verizon cited the wide availability of the Internet and mobile apps for consumers to access weather content any time of day as the reason for dropping TWC and its services.

The Weather Channel had earlier signed renewal agreements with major providers that are members of the National Cable Television Cooperative (NCTC), including Time Warner Cable and Cox Communications. While Verizon claimed it was a long-term business decision (instead of a carriage dispute), The Weather Channel launched a campaign to urge viewers to contact Fios about restoring the cable channel and its services.

It was announced on June 19, 2019, that The Weather Channel would return to Fios carriage beginning June 24, 2019.

==== ESPN lawsuit ====
In April 2015, ESPN Inc. sued Verizon for breaching its carriage contract by offering ESPN and ESPN2 as part of a separate sports package under its new "Custom TV" service. ESPN's contract requires the two networks to be part of the basic service. Verizon and ESPN reached a deal in May 2016. The terms of the deal were not made public.

==== Cablevision lawsuit ====
On May 19, 2015, Cablevision sued Verizon in the Southern District of New York to challenge Verizon's claim that it is 100 percent fiber-based. Cablevision started an advertising campaign to take the case mainstream. The two companies agreed to end the dispute in September 2015. The terms of the deal were not disclosed at the time.

== See also ==
- Fiber-optic communication
- List of multiple-system operators
