= Wide Open West =

Telecommunications provider in the United States

WideOpenWest, Inc.
- Type: Private
- Industry: Telecommunications
- Predecessor: Americast, Knology
- Founded: November 1996; 30 years ago in Denver, Colorado
- Headquarters: Denver, Colorado, U.S.
- Area served: Alabama; Florida; Georgia; Illinois; Indiana; Maryland; Michigan; Ohio (1996-2021); South Carolina; Tennessee
- Key people: Frank van der Post (CEO); Patrick Bratton (CFO); Aaron Brace (CTIO); Courtland Madock (CCO); Heather McCallion (CXO)
- Products: Broadband; Cable television IPTV; Digital cable Digital telephone HDTV; Internet; Internet security VoIP phone
- Brands: WOW!
- Revenue: ▲US$1,148.4 million(2020)
- Operating income: ▼US$22.2 million(2020)
- Net income: ▼US$14.4 million(2020)
- Total assets: ▲US$2,487.0 million(2020)
- Subsidiaries: Broadstripe
- Website: www.wowway.com

WideOpenWest, Inc. (doing business as WOW!) is the eighth largest cable operator in the United States with their network passing 1.9 million homes and businesses. With 538,100 subscribers as of November 2022, the company offers landline telephone, broadband Internet services, and (until 2026) cable television.

== History ==
Founded in 1996 in Denver, Colorado, WOW! built a network and was serving about 200 people in the Denver area five years later. Years later, Oak Hill Capital Partners and ABRY Partners sold the firm to Avista Capital Partners, without disclosing the terms of the sale.

In November 2001, it purchased Americast, an overbuild system in the Midwest built and operated by Ameritech New Media for an undisclosed amount per subscriber, estimated to have been at a cost of $600 per sub.

Although it currently does not operate in some of these areas, the Pennsylvania-based company began serving the more than 310,000 customers acquired through the purchase and previously served by Americast in the metropolitan areas surrounding Chicago, Cleveland, Columbus, Detroit, Denver, and Evansville.

On August 23, 2011, Wave Broadband and WOW! announced that they entered into an agreement to purchase substantially all of the assets of Broadstripe LLC, a provider of residential and commercial bundled communications services. On January 14, WOW! completed the acquisition of Broadstripe's cable systems in Michigan.

As of April 2012, the combined customer total exceeded 800,000 after WOW! acquired Knology, a broadband firm that operated in 13 markets. Knology had previously merged with Valley Telephone Company in 1999, Prairiewave Communications in 2007, Graceba Total Communications in 2008, and Sunflower Broadband in 2011.

In June 2014, it sold its cable, Internet and phone systems in the South Dakota markets to Clarity Telecom. Part of the multimillion-dollar deal, worth $262 million, included the markets in Iowa and Minnesota previously served by Knology and PrairieWave Communications. In 2015, these markets would officially become known as Vast Broadband.

In September 2016, WOW! purchased NuLink, a cable company serving Newnan, Georgia with approximately 34,000 customers at the time the deal closed. In October, it came to an agreement with Midco to sell its systems in Lawrence, Kansas; these systems currently pass approximately 67,000 homes and businesses in the area.

After a 2017 initial public offering, the firm was publicly traded with Avista Capital Partners and Crestview Partners retaining significant stakes. On June 28, WideOpenWest officially no longer serves the Lawrence, Kansas area.

On March 6, 2018 WOW! announced that they had deployed DOCSIS 3.1 to 95% of their footprint, one of the first cable operators to reach that near-ubiquitous threshold. As of August 6, 2019 Avista sold their shares in the firm, leaving Crestview WOW's largest shareholder holding a 37% stake in the company.

On June 30, 2021 WOW! stated that it is selling its Cleveland and Columbus, Ohio, service areas to Atlantic Broadband (since renamed Breezeline) for $1.13 billion; it closed the deal on September 1. Also in June, WOW! announced the sale of its systems in Chicago, Evansville, and Anne Arundel, Maryland to Astound Broadband for $661 million.

On May 15, 2023, WOW! has announced that it would discontinue its in-house TV services, including WOW! TV+ and migrating its video customers to YouTube TV across its footprint. WOW! would still maintain its cable TV system while the said migration took place. This move frees up bandwidth for the company's ISP overall. The full transition has been completed on April 2026, in which traditional cable TV service has dissolved.

On December 31, 2025, DigitalBridge and Crestview announced that they had completed the take-private acquisition of WOW! for $1.5 billion.

== Internet availability by state ==
State	Population Covered by WOW!
Michigan	1,872,510
Alabama	624,373
Illinois	1,604,922
South Carolina	260,525
Florida	804,094
Indiana	317,809
Georgia	474,460
Tennessee	139,600

== Network availability by city ==
City	Homes passed	Coaxial Miles	Fiber Miles	Total Network Miles
Detroit, MI	706,366	6,286	2,155	8,441
Chicago, IL	488,219	3,242	1,073	4,315
Pinellas, FL	297,635	3,441	586	4,027
Huntsville, AL	127,211	1,943	454	2,397
Baltimore, MD (Broadstripe)	110,806	1,226	427	1,653
Montgomery, AL	107,554	1,303	336	1,639
Evansville, IN	105,939	1,323	459	1,782
Augusta, GA	96,887	1,356	448	1,804
Charleston, SC	93,599	1,209	563	1,772
Lansing, MI	92,533	2,045	732	2,777
Columbus, GA	86,131	1,033	300	1,333
Panama City, FL	84,228	951	218	1,169
Knoxville, TN	54,597	764	317	1,081
Newnan, GA	43,440	838	352	1,190
Dothan, AL	33,184	547	214	761
West Point, GA	17,748	336	338	674
Auburn, AL	15,251	188	202	390

== See also ==
- NebuAd
