= Broadstripe =

American telecommunications and cable company

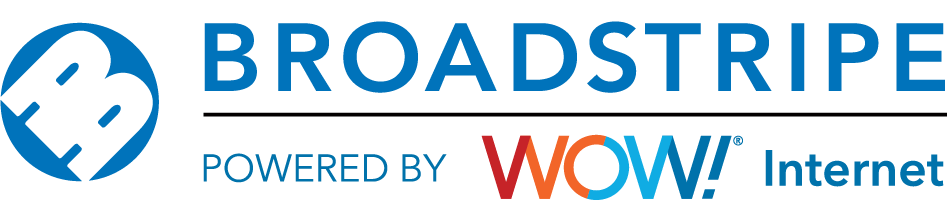
- Company type: Subsidiary
- Industry: Telecommunications
- Founded: 1998; 28 years ago
- Headquarters: Millersville, Maryland
- Products: Cable television, Broadband internet, VoIP
- Parent: WOW!
- Website: www.broadstripe.com

Broadstripe is a telecommunications and cable company owned by WideOpenWest and Anne Arundel Broadband, with WideOpenWest holding a majority stake in the company. Serving communities in Maryland, Broadstripe serves residential customers with WOW! serving business customers, with entertainment and communications products including digital cable, home phone and broadband internet services.

== History ==
In 1998, John Brooks, co-founder of Brooks Fiber Media, along with former Charter Communications, Inc. executives Kelvin Westbrook, Jeffrey Sander and Charles Prayer, Jr. formed Millennium Digital Media (Millennium.) In September 2006, Millennium named Bill Shreffler, president and chief executive officer. Millennium officially changed its name to Broadstripe in October 2007. In November of that year, Broadstripe attempted to acquire James Cable LLC of Bloomfield Hills, Michigan for $125 million, the deal eventually fell through between the two companies. Since then, the cable provider has reorganized its leadership team, adding a number of telecommunications industry veterans, including its chief executive Gustavo Prilick in August 2008. According to an August 2009 article in the St. Louis Business Journal, Broadstripe spent nearly $20 million upgrading its network and overhauling customer care operations.

=== Bankruptcy ===
On January 2, 2009, Broadstripe filed for Chapter 11 bankruptcy protection in St. Louis, MO. Growing mostly via acquisition, efforts to increase margins were unsatisfactory due to increased competition from satellite providers, and two land-line based competitors in Maryland. In an effort to reduce debt, management attempted to sell parts of the company to competitors, but was unsuccessful.

The company has reported a $2.63 million net loss in September, 2010 on revenue of $7.68 billion. Depreciation and amortization for the month totaled $2.2 million. Also, Broadstripe was authorized in October to adopt a bonus program for 12 executives that may cost as much as $446,000. To qualify, the cable system for which the employees work must be sold.

In February 2010, the company launched a 60-day, money-back guarantee program offering both new and existing residential customers 60 days to test new services from the cable provider’s offerings. According to the company, if the customer is not satisfied or has issues, Broadstripe will pay for the subscriber to restore service with their old provider.

=== Sale of Systems ===
On August 26, 2011 Broadstripe announced the sale of its Michigan cable system to WideOpenWest (WOW!). On the same date it announced the sale of its Oregon and Washington cable systems to WaveDivision's Wave Broadband unit. Its Maryland system was sold to Anne Arundel Broadband, and will be operated under the Broadstripe name by former Broadstripe Management. These sales closed on January 13, 2012.

In October 2014 WideOpenWest (WOW!) acquired a majority ownership in the Maryland system owned by Anne Arundel Broadband operating as Broadstripe, making Broadstripe a subsidiary of WOW!

== Services ==
Broadstripe offers the following services:

- Digital Cable, which includes commercial-free music channels, pay-per-view movies and television shows, premium and High-Definition (HD) channels.
- Internet, offering speeds from 100 mbps-1000 mbps
- VoIP Phone Service
