= Breezeline =

American telecommunications company

Cogeco US Finance, LLC
- Trade name: Breezeline
- Formerly: Atlantic Broadband (2004–2022)
- Type: Subsidiary
- Industry: Telecommunications
- Predecessors: Metrocast; G-Force Cable; Charter Communications; WOW! (Ohio Systems)
- Founded: 2004; 22 years ago, as spin-off of Charter Communications
- Headquarters: Quincy, Massachusetts, USA
- Areas served: Ohio; New Hampshire; Maine; Connecticut; New York; Pennsylvania; Delaware; Maryland; Massachusetts; West Virginia; Virginia; South Carolina; Florida
- Key people: Frank Van Der Post (President); Patrick Bratton (CFO)
- Products: Broadband Internet; Cable television IPTV; Digital cable Digital telephone HDTV; Internet; Internet security VoIP phone
- Parent: Cogeco (2012–present)
- ASN: 11776
- Website: www.breezeline.com

Breezeline (previously Atlantic Broadband) is the trade name for the United States operations of Cogeco Communications, constituting the 8th largest cable operator in the United States, based on the number of television service customers served. The company currently provides TV, Internet and phone services using a combined coaxial cable & fiber-to-the-premises (FTTP) network. Breezeline currently has approximately 707,000 broadband customers located in thirteen states. The company is headquartered in Quincy, Massachusetts.

== History ==
Breezeline was formed as Atlantic Broadband in 2004 through the acquisition of nonstrategic regions from Charter Communications, later growing with the acquisition of properties from MetroCast, G Force Cable, and WOW!.

Logo as Atlantic Broadband following Cogeco purchase

On July 18, 2012, it was announced that Cogeco would be purchasing Atlantic Broadband for US$1.36 billion.

Originally spun off from Charter, Atlantic at the time was the 14th largest cable group in the U.S. market, it was owned by Abry Partners IV, L.P. and Oak Hill Capital (the private equity firm run by Robert M. Bass).

In 2018, Cogeco acquired MetroCast and merged it with the Atlantic Broadband system. MetroCast networks covered around 236,000 homes and businesses in New Hampshire, Maine, Pennsylvania, Maryland and Virginia and served about 120,000 Internet, 76,000 cable and 37,000 telephone customers.

In 2020, Atlantic Broadband announced that it had signed an agreement to acquire Thames Valley Communications, a broadband services company operating in Southeastern Connecticut.

On June 30, 2021, it was announced that Atlantic Broadband would be purchasing the Ohio markets of Columbus and Cleveland from WOW! in a deal valued at $1.125 billion USD The WOW! Ohio broadband systems Atlantic Broadband will be purchasing pass approximately 688,000 homes and businesses in Cleveland and Columbus and serve approximately 196,000 Internet, 61,000 video and 35,000 telephony customers, as of March 31, 2021. On September 1, 2021 Atlantic Broadband closed the transaction to acquire WOW!'s Ohio markets.

In January 2022, the company announced it would be adopting the new "Breezeline" brand, as the Atlantic Broadband name does not accurately reflect the provider's current geographical reach, which now stretches into the Midwest and Deep South.

== Internet availability by state ==
State	Population Covered by Breezeline	Max Internet speed Offered
Connecticut	141,341	1000Mbit/s
Delaware	52,295	1000Mbit/s
Florida	271,212	1000Mbit/s
Maine	33,061	1000Mbit/s
Maryland	231,522	1000Mbit/s
New Hampshire	157,090	1000Mbit/s
New York	10,881	1000Mbit/s
Ohio	1,521,373	1000Mbit/s
Pennsylvania	457,177	1000Mbit/s
South Carolina	131,510	1000Mbit/s
Virginia	100,998	1000Mbit/s
West Virginia	37,638	1000Mbit/s

== Network availability by city ==
City	Number of houses Breezeline passes	Coaxial Miles	Fiber Miles	Total Network Miles
Columbus, OH	434,697	4,685	1,695	6,380
Cleveland, OH	252,579	2,676	835	3,511

== See also ==
- Cable television in the United States
- List of United States telephone companies
- List of multiple-system operators
- List of wired multiple-system broadband providers in Massachusetts (by municipality)
