= Hans Vestberg =

Swedish business executive

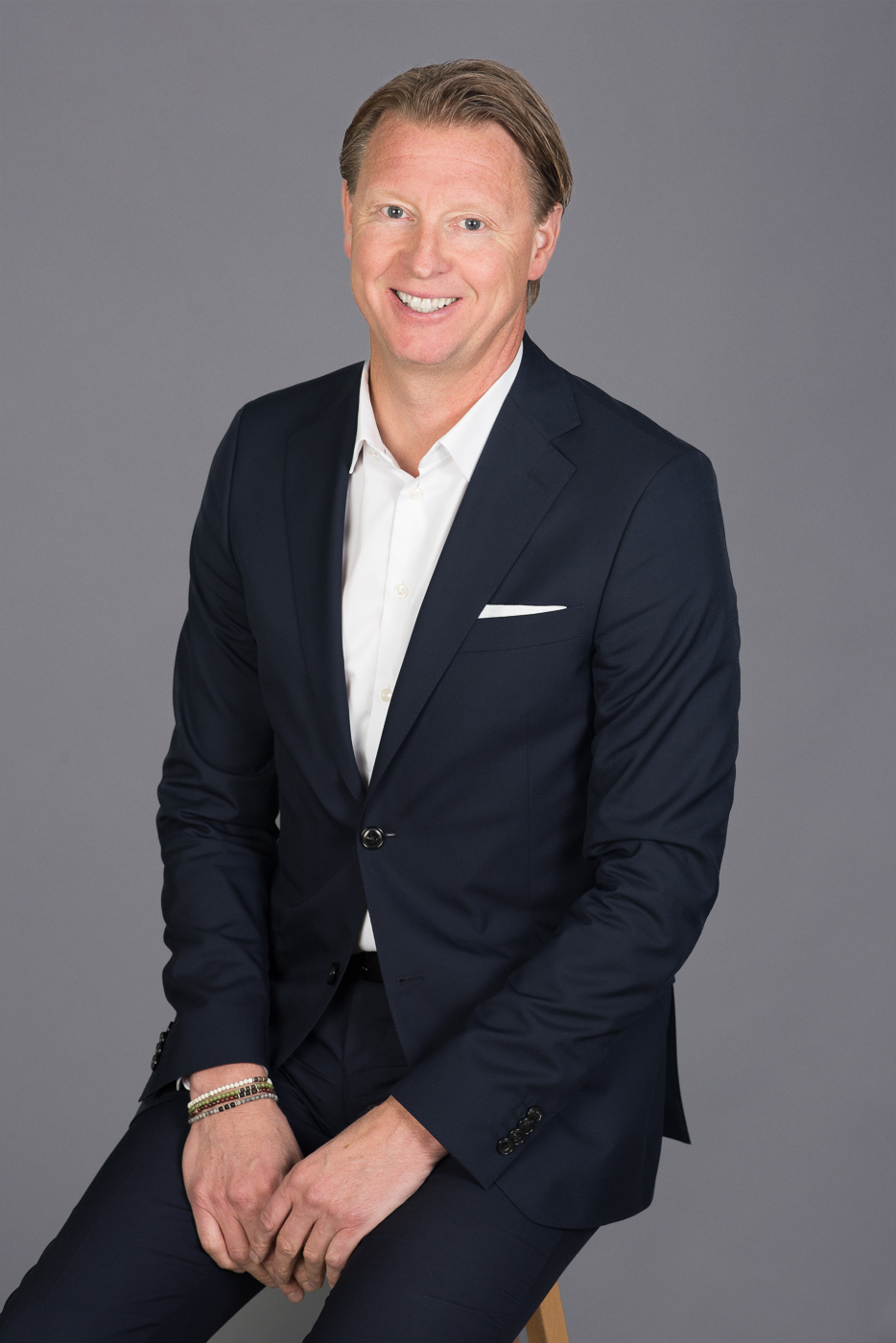
- Born: 23 June 1965 (age 61); Hudiksvall, Sweden
- Education: Uppsala University (BBA)
- Occupations: CEO of Ericsson (2010–2015); CTO of Verizon Communications (2017–2018); CEO of Verizon (2018–2025)
- Board member of: BlackRock

Hans Vestberg (born 23 June 1965) is the former CEO and Chairman of Verizon, where he has worked as executive vice president of the company's network and technology team, and as chief technology officer. Vestberg was previously the CEO of telecommunications company Ericsson, president of the Swedish Olympic Committee, and chairman of the Swedish Handball Federation.

== Early life and education ==
Hans Vestberg was born in Hudiksvall, Sweden, in 1965. He received a Bachelor of Business Administration from Uppsala University in Sweden in 1991.

== Career ==
Vestberg began his career in Hudiksvall at Ericsson Cables in 1991. He worked at Ericsson for 25 years, with management roles for the company in Sweden, China, Brazil, Mexico and the United States. He was CFO for Ericsson in Brazil from 1998 to 2000. From 2000 to 2002, Vestberg was CFO for Ericsson in North America and comptroller for the Americas. He was president for Ericsson in Mexico from 2002 to 2003. Afterward, he was a senior vice president and executive vice president for Ericsson before he was named chief financial officer in 2007, a post he held through 2009. Vestberg became the first CEO of Ericsson without an engineering background when he replaced Carl-Henric Svanberg in January 2010. Slowing industry demand and new competition impacted Vestberg's tenure as CEO, despite his cost cutting efforts and acquisitions. He was ousted July 2015, following Ericsson's poor financial performance.

Vestberg joined Verizon as the company's chief technology officer and executive vice president of its network and technology team on April 3, 2017. There, he oversaw Verizon's fiber network and the development of Verizon's nascent 5G network. On June 8, 2018, Verizon announced that Vestberg would succeed Lowell McAdam as the company's chief executive officer on August 1, 2018. In 2021, Verizon and Vestberg were criticized by with a group of retired shareholders called the Association of BellTel Retirees for Vestberg's $39.4 million golden parachute executive compensation plan.

== Awards and recognition ==
In 2019, Corporate Responsibility Magazine named him Responsible CEO of the Year for a public company.

In 2021, the Ad Council recognized his corporate citizenship for Verizon's role in supporting its COVID-19 vaccination education initiative.

In 2024, the McCain Institute recognized Vestberg with the In The Arena Award for his character-driven leadership and philanthropic work.

== Board participation ==
Vestberg chairs the World Economic Forum's Edison Alliance, a global telecom ecosystem that in 2021 focused on digital inclusion. In May 2021, Vestberg was elected to the board of directors of BlackRock, where he is on the governance committee. Vestberg is a board member on the United Nations Foundation, and the Whitaker Peace & Development Initiative, as well as a commissioner on the Broadband Commission for Sustainable Development.

== Sports ==
Vestberg was the chairman of the Swedish Handball Federation from 2007 to 2016. He left the Swedish Handball Federation to be president of the Swedish Olympic Committee from 2016 to 2018 as the country vied to host the 2026 Winter Olympics in Stockholm and Åre. Vestberg had previously played semipro handball in Brazil.

== Personal life ==
Vestberg is married and has two children. He is fluent in Swedish, English, Spanish, and Portuguese.
