= Telogis =

- Type: Subsidiary
- Industry: Software as a service
- Founded: 2001
- Headquarters: Aliso Viejo, California
- Number of employees: 500-1000 (2015)
- Parent: Verizon Connect
- Website: www.telogis.com

Telogis was a US-based company that developed location-based software to manage mobile resources. Telogis sold software as a service (SaaS) which incorporated location information into applications for fleet owners as well as geospatial software development toolkits.

In 2016, Telogis was acquired by Verizon.

== History ==
Telogis was founded in 2001 by Newth Morris, Jason Koch and Ralph Mason, as a trunked radio hardware and software provider. Former Novell Inc. Chairman and CEO Jack Messman was chairman of the board of directors. The company was started with investments from its founders, and by 2012 the privately held company had approximately $69 million in revenue.

Wall Street Journal reporter Don Clark stated of the company's technology that, "Telogis exploited the evolution of software-as-a-service–placing data from vehicles in the cloud ... so that companies that own vehicle fleets can track their cars and trucks without the need to set up their own servers for the purpose." In July 2010 Telogis acquired the assets of Remote Dynamics, then in February, 2011 Telogis acquired the assets of Intergis, a provider of routing, mobile resource and fleet management software. In July 2012 Telogis acquired Navtrak. The acquisition resulted in Telogis Navigation, a commercial navigation software that used a built-in feedback system to provide current road network information.

The company's first outside venture capital was announced in October 2013, with $93 million from Kleiner Perkins Caufield & Byers. In February 2011 private investors provided $2.9 million. Additional funding was received from GM Ventures in 2014.

On 21 June 2016, it was announced that Telogis would be acquired by Verizon.

On 6 March 2018, a press release announced that Telogis would be rebranded along with its sister companies, Fleetmatics and Verizon Telematics, as Verizon Connect.

== Software ==
Telogis software collects location-based data from embedded and installed hardware in vehicles, as well as from mobile devices. It works on over 40 different hardware platforms from 12 different manufacturers and collects various data. Telogis also provides a software development kit for users to create location-based mobile and desktop applications. One of the primary functions of Telogis's software is to provide United States Federal Government mandated hours of service commercial driver activity logs.

== OEM agreements ==
Telogis provides a built-in telematics option for several OEMs including Ford, GM, Volvo, Mack, Hino, Isuzu (United States based trucks), and Manitowoc. This allows fleet owners to opt for factory-installed telematics hardware when purchasing selected new cars and trucks. This option provides immediate over-the-air activation when adding new vehicles to their fleet management system and additional data points such as DEF (Diesel Exhaust Fluid) quality, water in the diesel and extra DTCs (Diagnostic Trouble Codes) across the body, powertrain and chassis. For off-highway vehicles, Telogis also works with John Deere.

In addition to the OEM built-in options, selected Freightliner trucks offer a pre-wired option that makes it simpler to add the required hardware for tracking trucks.

== Uses ==
In October 2013 the Wall Street Journal reported that trucking companies were using Telogis to monitor their drivers, using the data they received to either reward or discipline their drivers. This has led some employees to become concerned about privacy issues. Councilman Lewis Rotella of Niagara Falls, New York, stated that, "It’s almost like big brother’s watching you ... You have to put some trust into the employees doing the job," in response to a 2006 contract placing Telogis devices in Niagara city vehicles. He stated further that he believed that such devices can be used to ensure safety, but should not be used for "surreptitiously trailing employees". Rotella also admitted to using the devices himself in his private business to monitor safety. Stephen Roy, president of Mack Trucks, another Telogis partner, also stated that the software would be used by Mack to help manage workflow and not to track the minute-by-minute decisions of its employees.

== Recognition ==
- In March 2014, Telogis was listed among Inc. Magazine's "Build 100" for sustained year-over-year growth.
- In November 2013, Telogis was ranked among Deloitte's "Technology Fast 500".
- In October 2010, the company was ranked on the Inc 5000.

== See also ==
- Fleetmatics
- Field service management
- Field force automation
- Mobile enterprise application framework
- Mobile asset management
