= University of San Diego =

Private research university in San Diego, California

- Former names: San Diego College for Women (1949–1972); San Diego University (1949–1972)
- Motto: Emitte Spiritum Tuum (Latin)
- Motto in English: Send Forth Thy Spirit
- Type: Private university
- Established: 1949; 77 years ago
- Religious affiliation: Catholic
- Academic affiliations: ACCU; CONAHEC; NAICU; Space-grant
- Endowment: $767 million (2025)
- President: James T. Harris III
- Faculty: 1007
- Undergraduates: 5,702
- Postgraduates: 2,529
- Other students: 810
- Location: San Diego, California, United States; 32°46′16″N 117°11′15″W
- Campus: Urban
- Colors: Blue and white
- Nickname: Toreros
- Sporting affiliations: NCAA Division I – WCC, Pioneer Football League
- Mascot: Diego Torero
- Website: www.sandiego.edu

The University of San Diego (USD) is a private Catholic research university in San Diego, California, United States. Chartered in 1949 as the independent San Diego College for Women and San Diego University (comprising the College for Men and School of Law), the two institutions merged in 1972.

The university includes the College of Arts and Sciences, Hahn School of Nursing and Health Science, Joan B. Kroc School of Peace Studies, Division of Professional and Continuing Education, Knauss School of Business, School of Law, School of Leadership and Education Services (SOLES), and the Shiley-Marcos School of Engineering.

USD has 89 undergraduate and graduate programs, and enrolls approximately 9,073 undergraduate, paralegal, graduate and law students. It is classified among "R2: Doctoral Universities – High research activity". The San Diego Toreros compete in NCAA Division I (FCS) as a member of the West Coast Conference.

== History ==
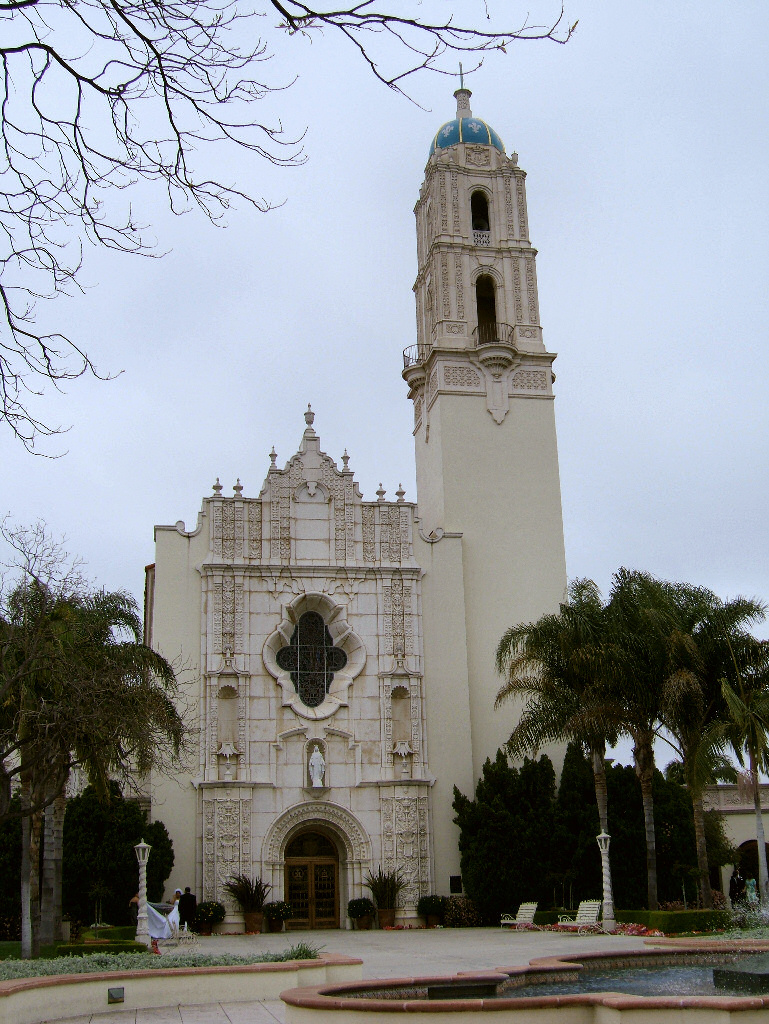
Immaculata Parish Church at USD showing the architectural style of the campus

Charters were granted in 1949 for the San Diego College for Women and San Diego University, which included the College for Men and School of Law. The College for Women opened its doors to its first class of students in 1952. The Most Reverend Charles F. Buddy, D.D., then bishop of the Diocese of San Diego and Reverend Mother Rosalie Hill, RSCJ, a Superior Vicaress of the Society of the Sacred Heart of Jesus, chartered the institution from resources drawn from their respective organizations on a stretch of land known as "Alcalá Park," named for Didacus of Alcalá. In 1954, the College for Men and the School of Law opened. These two schools originally occupied Bogue Hall on the same site of University High School, which would later become the home of the University of San Diego High School. Starting in 1954, Alcalá Park also served as the diocesan chancery office and housed the episcopal offices, until the diocese moved to a vacated Benedictine convent that was converted to a pastoral center. In 1957, Immaculate Heart Major Seminary and St. Francis Minor Seminary were moved into their newly completed facility, now known as Maher Hall. The Immaculata Chapel, now no longer affiliated with USD, also opened that year as part of the seminary facilities. For nearly two decades, these schools co-existed on Alcalá Park. Immaculate Heart closed at the end of 1968, when its building was renamed De Sales Hall; St. Francis remained open until 1970, when it was transferred to another location on campus, leaving all of the newly named Bishop Leo T. Maher Hall to the newly merged co-educational University of San Diego in 1972.

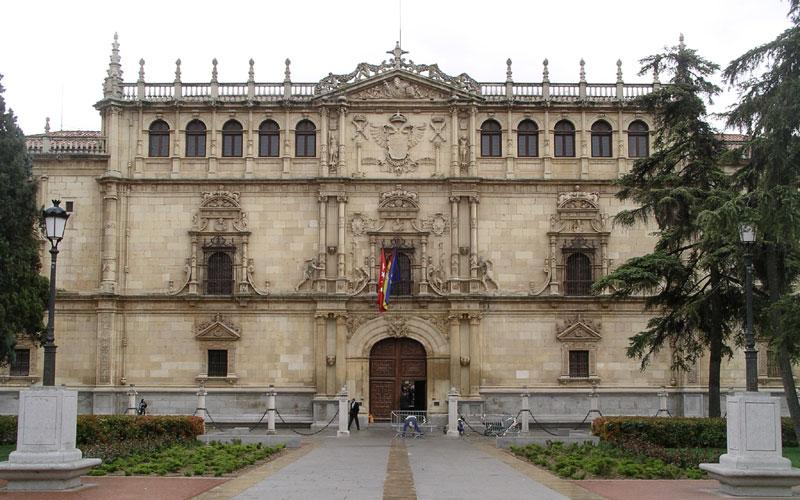
The Universidad de Alcalá in Spain, inspiration for Mother Hill's USD

Significant periods of expansion of the university, since the 1972 merger, occurred in the mid-1980s, as well as in 1998, when Joan B. Kroc, philanthropist and wife of McDonald's financier Ray Kroc, endowed USD with a gift of $25 million for the construction of the Institute for Peace & Justice. Other significant donations to the college came in the form of multimillion-dollar gifts from weight-loss tycoon Jenny Craig, inventor Donald Shiley, investment banker and alumnus Bert Degheri, and an additional gift of $50 million Mrs. Kroc left the School of Peace Studies upon her death. These gifts helped make possible, respectively, the Jenny Craig Pavilion (an athletic arena), the Donald P. Shiley Center for Science and Technology, the Degheri Alumni Center, and the Joan B. Kroc School of Peace Studies. As a result, USD has been able to host the West Coast Conference (WCC) basketball tournament in 2002, 2003 and 2008, and hosted international functions such as the Kyoto Laureate Symposium at the Joan B. Kroc Institute for Peace & Justice and at USD's Shiley Theatre. Shiley's gift has provided the university with some additional, and more advanced, teaching laboratories than it had previously. In 2005, the university expanded the Colachis Plaza from the Immaculata along Marian Way to the east end of Hall, which effectively closed the east end of the campus to vehicular traffic. That same year, the student body approved plans for a renovation and expansion of the Hahn University Center which began at the end of 2007. The new Student Life Pavilion (SLP) opened in 2009 and hosts the university's new student dining area(s), offices for student organizations and event spaces. The Hahn University Center is now home to administrative offices, meeting and event spaces, and a restaurant and wine bar, La Gran Terazza.

In 2022, students began taking classes at the new Knauss Center for Business Education, a 120,000-square-foot complex that serves as an innovation and collaboration ecosystem for business students.

In the spring of 2022, USD's total enrollment was 9,041 undergraduate, graduate, paralegal and law students from 85 countries and 50 US states.

In 2026, the Institute for Shipboard Education selected the University of San Diego as the next academic partner for the Semester at Sea study-abroad program. The first University of San Diego-sponsored voyage is scheduled for Fall 2028.

== Environment and location ==
Alcalá Park sits atop the edge of a mesa overlooking Mission Bay and provides stunning panoramic views of San Diego.

The philosophy of USD's founder and her fellow religious relied on the belief that studying in beautiful surroundings could improve the educational experience of students. Thus, the university's buildings are designed in a 16th-century Plateresque architecture, a style of the Spanish Renaissance, paying homage to both San Diego's Catholic heritage and the Universidad de Alcalá in Spain.

The campus is located approximately two miles north of downtown San Diego, on the north crest of Mission Valley in the community of Linda Vista. From the westernmost edges of Alcalá Park the communities of Mission Hills, Old Town, Point Loma, Ocean Beach, Bay Park, Mission Beach and Pacific Beach can be seen. Also, the Pacific Ocean, San Diego Bay, the Coronado Islands and La Jolla are visible from the campus.

In February 2022, Travel+Leisure named USD campus as one of the most beautiful college campuses in the United States, and Best Choice Schools ranked it the most beautiful urban campus in the United States.

== Administration ==
Though a Catholic university, the school is no longer governed directly by the Diocese of San Diego. Today, a lay board of trustees governs the university's operations. However, the Bishop of San Diego, currently Michael Pham, retains a seat as a permanent member and retains control of the school's designation of "Catholic."

== Academics ==
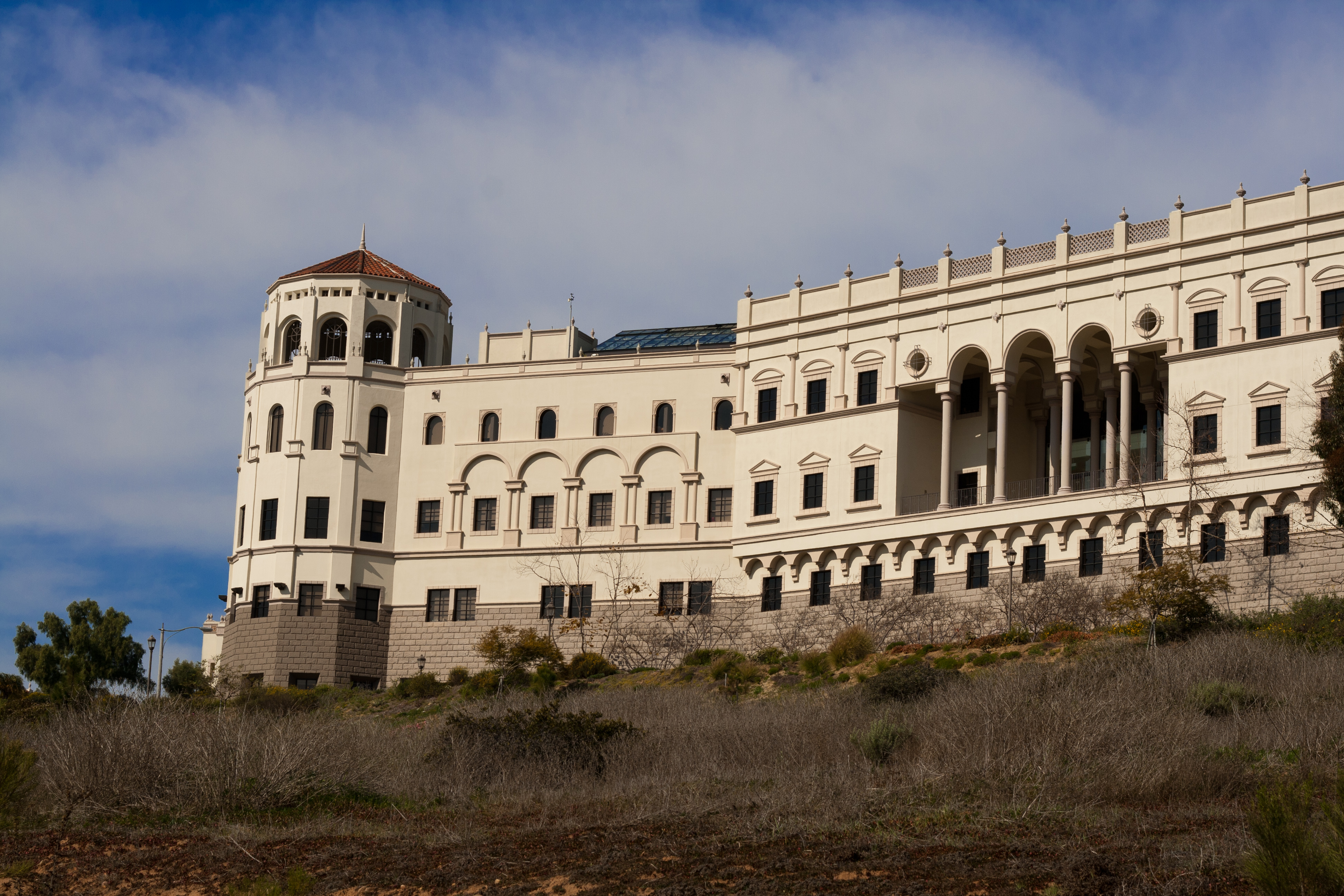
The Donald P. Shiley Center for Science and Technology, opened in 2003

USD offers more than 80 degrees at the bachelor's, master's, and doctoral levels. Students choose from undergraduate and graduate degree programs from the seven schools and college that comprise the University of San Diego:

- College of Arts and Sciences
- Knauss School of Business
- Shiley-Marcos School of Engineering
- Hahn School of Nursing and Health Science
- Joan B. Kroc School of Peace Studies
- School of Law
- School of Leadership and Education Sciences

The College of Arts and Sciences and the School of Law are the oldest academic divisions at USD; the Joan B. Kroc School of Peace Studies is the university's newest school. USD offers an honors program at the undergraduate level, with approximately 300 students enrolled annually.

- Undergraduate Programs: 43 bachelor's degrees with many concentrations; 56 minors
- Graduate Programs: 36 master's degrees, Juris Doctor (JD), five LLM degrees, four doctorates, dual degree programs

USD has a Carnegie Classification of R2- Doctoral University: High Research Activity. Carnegie gives this ranking to "institutions that awarded at least 20 research/scholarship doctoral degrees and had at least $5 million in total research expenditures (as reported through the National Science Foundation (NSF) Higher Education Research & Development Survey (HERD))."

The School of business was recently renamed to Knauss School of Business after Don Knauss announced to increase the philanthropic giving to the university to $50 million as an investment in educating ethical and compassionate business leaders

=== Rankings ===
Academic rankings

National
- Forbes: 106
- U.S. News & World Report: 98
- Washington Monthly: 74
- WSJ/College Pulse: 47

Global
- QS: 1001-1200
- THE: 601-800

Undergraduate demographics as of Fall 2020
Race and ethnicity	Total
White	49%
Hispanic	22%
Other (Note: Other consists of multiracial Americans & those who prefer to not say.)	10%
Asian	7%
Foreign national	7%
Black	3%

USD was ranked 47th in the WSJ/College Pulse 2025 Best Colleges in the U.S., an annual ranking that rates the top 500 universities in the country.

USD is the youngest independent institution on the U.S. News & World Report list of top 100 universities in the United States. In 2021, University of San Diego was ranked tied for 88th in the "National Universities". U.S. News & World Report also ranked the University of San Diego's undergraduate Engineering program tied for 13th in the U.S. for engineering schools where doctorates are not offered, and the #1 Catholic Graduate Nursing School in the nation.

The Knauss School of Business was ranked the second-highest undergraduate business school in California, according to the 2022 ranking from Poets & Quants for undergraduate business schools. The School of Business has ranked No. 1 in the nation for two years in a row on College Factual’s ranking of Best Real Estate Colleges in the United States and No. 13 of Best Communications Schools in the United States.

In February 2022, Travel+Leisure named USD campus as one of the most beautiful college campuses in the United States. In 2021, The Princeton Review ranked the University of San Diego 6th in Most Beautiful Campus, 8th in Best Quality of life, 14th in Most Popular Study Abroad Program, and 18th in Green Colleges.

In 2014, University of San Diego was ranked the 482nd top college in the United States by Payscale and CollegeNet's Social Mobility Index college rankings. 18% of students are pell-grant eligible.

In 2013, QS Global 200 Business Schools Report ranked USD's MBA program 59th in North America.

USD's Shiley Theatre Program in partnership with The Old Globe was ranked in the Top 10 "Best Drama Schools" by the Hollywood Reporter in 2024. The two-year MFA in Classical Acting is one of the most competitive in the country, with a two percent acceptance rate. Seven students are recruited from across the U.S. and internationally each year, receive full scholarships as well as stipends for living expenses, and work in productions at The Old Globe during the summer.

== Student Life ==
The university hosts a diverse Greek life community, including fraternities and sororities. Approximately 25% of USD’s undergraduate population participates in fraternity and sorority life.

In 2020, the undergraduate chapter of Nu Alpha Kappa at USD suspended operations following allegations against members of nearby chapters. Reports indicated that members were found guilty of theft and had also been accused of sexual assault at other close by institutions. Lambda Chi Alpha currently operates as an unrecognized group.

== Athletics ==
The Toreros compete in NCAA Division I Football Championship Subdivision (FCS) of the National Collegiate Athletic Association (NCAA) and are members of the West Coast Conference for most sports.

=== Facilities ===
Athletic facilities for the school include:

- Jenny Craig Pavilion
- Torero Stadium
- Fowler Park and Cunningham Field
- Skip and Cindy Hogan Tennis Center
- USD Basketball Performance Center
- USD Sports Center Pool
- USD Softball Complex
- McNamara Fitness Room
- Varsity Weight Room
- Practice/Recreation Facilities
- Erg Room
- USD Boat House

USD has hosted NCAA Tournament events in men's and women's soccer, as well as men's and women's tennis. Additionally, between 2001 and 2003, the Jenny Craig Pavilion played host to the West Coast Conference Basketball Championships, as well as in 2008. Torero stadium has also played host to the 2012 Women's Soccer College Cup.

== Notable alumni ==
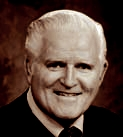
Thomas J. Whelan, 1961 (BA) & 1965 (JD), Senior United States district judge of the United States District Court for the Southern District of California

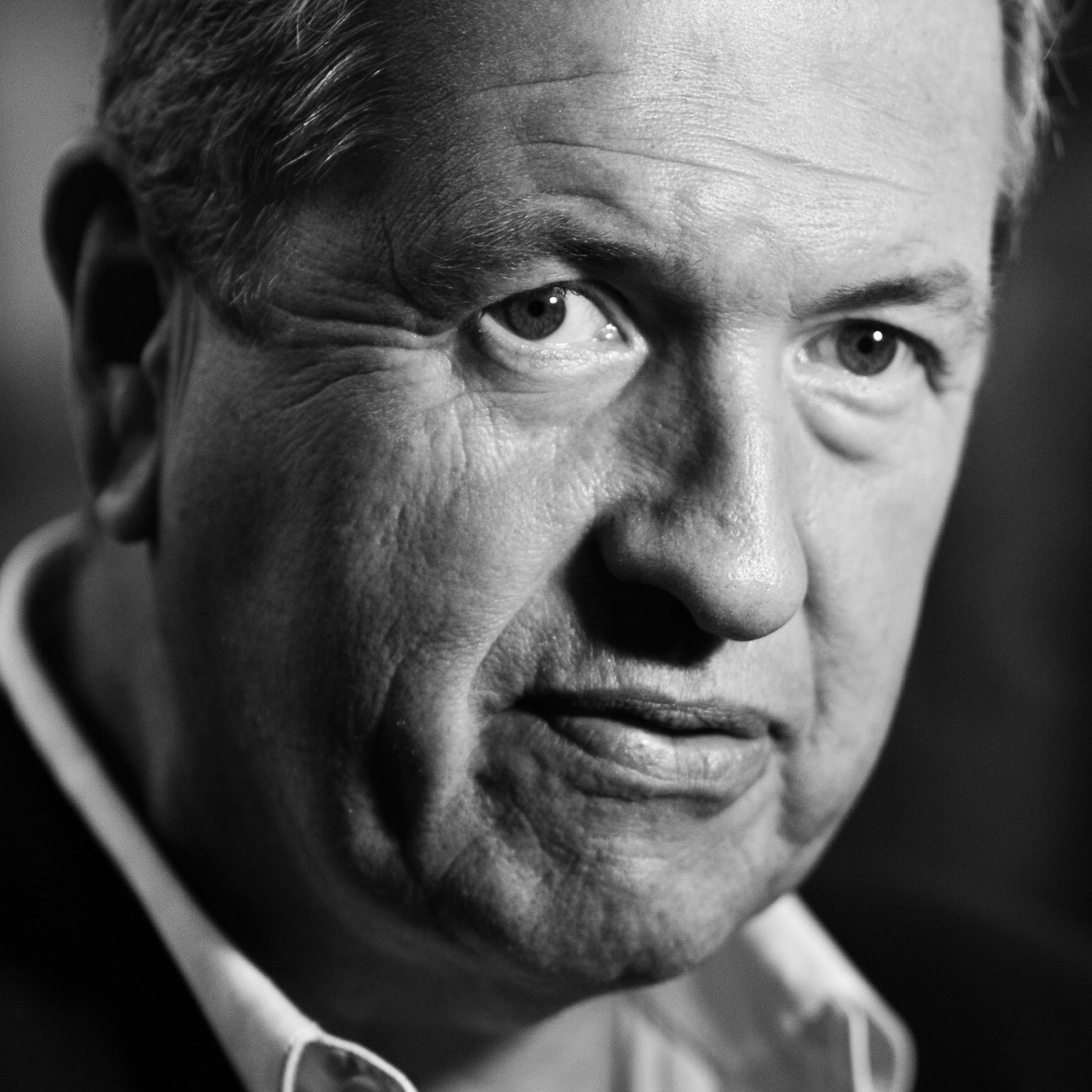
Mario Testino, 1975 (BA), Peruvian fashion and portrait photographer

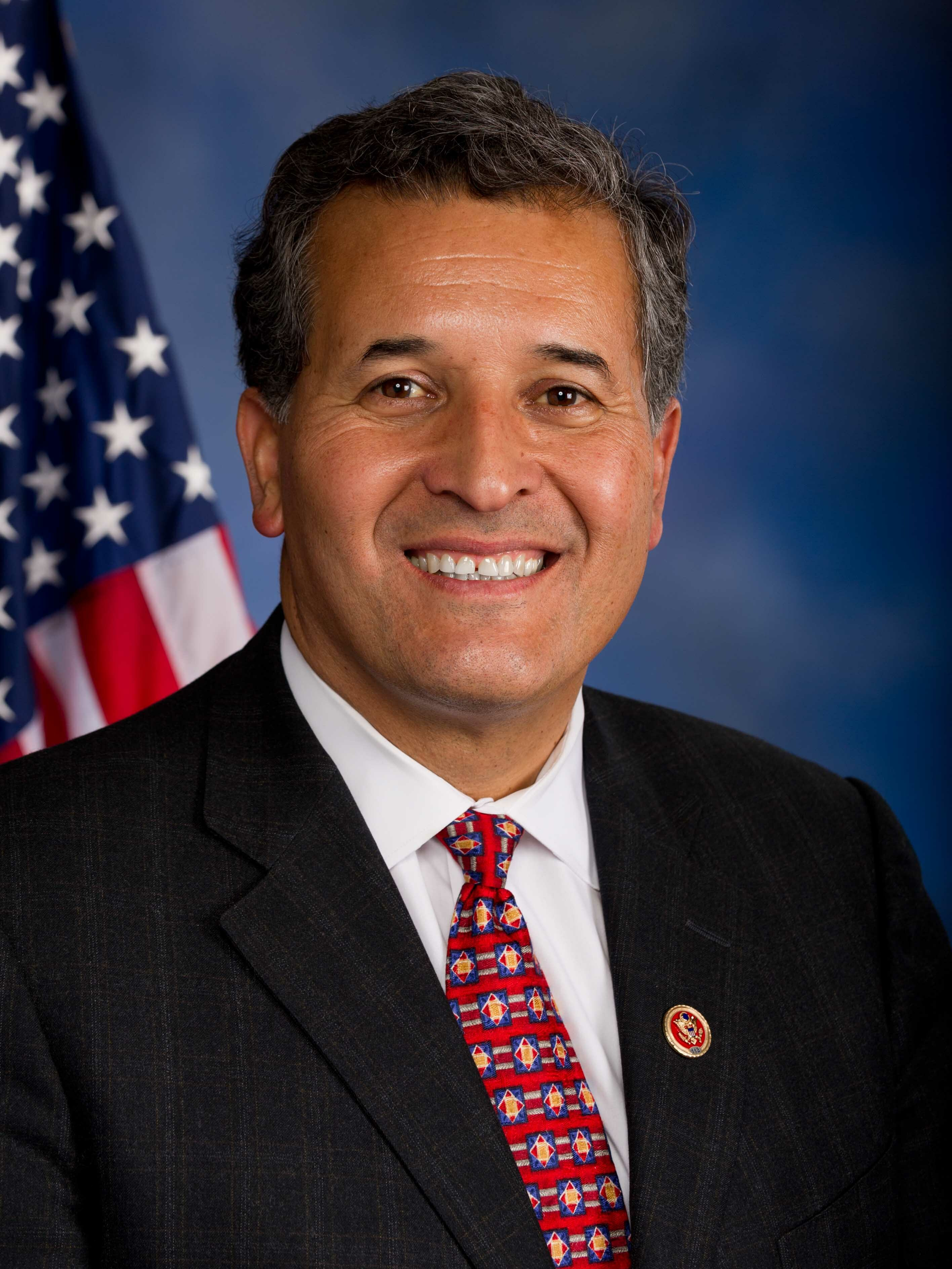
Juan Vargas, 1983 (BA), U.S. Representative for California's 51st congressional district

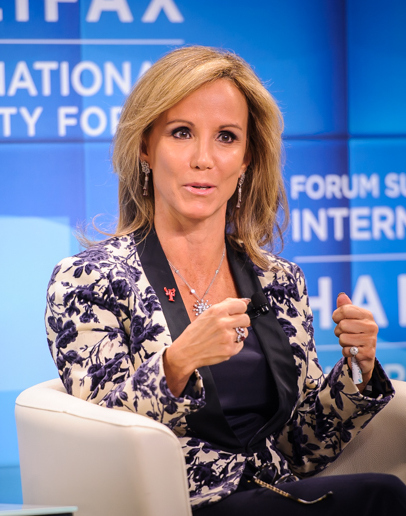
Frances Townsend, 1984 (JD), former Homeland Security Advisor to President of the United States George W. Bush; TV personality

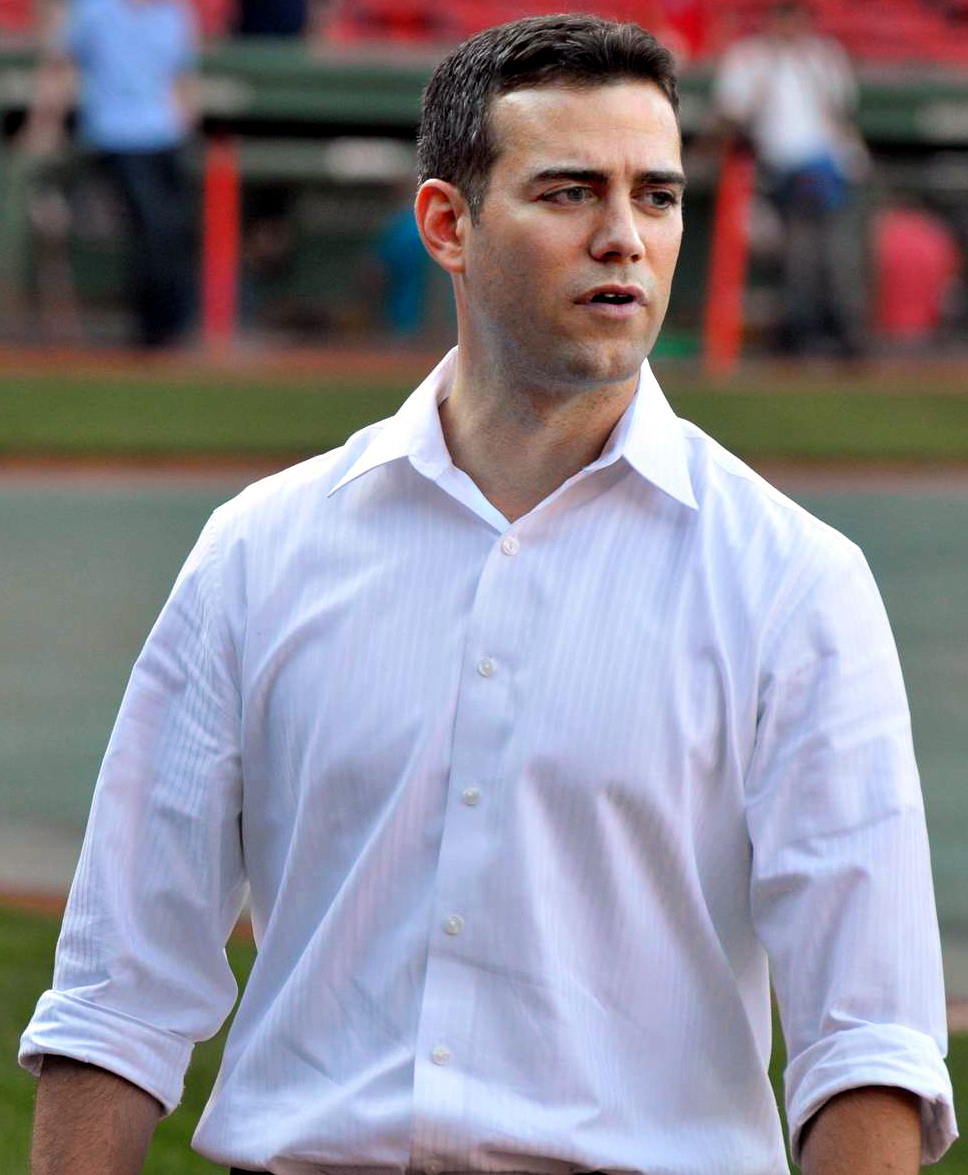
Theo Epstein, 2000, (JD), President of Baseball Operations for the Chicago Cubs

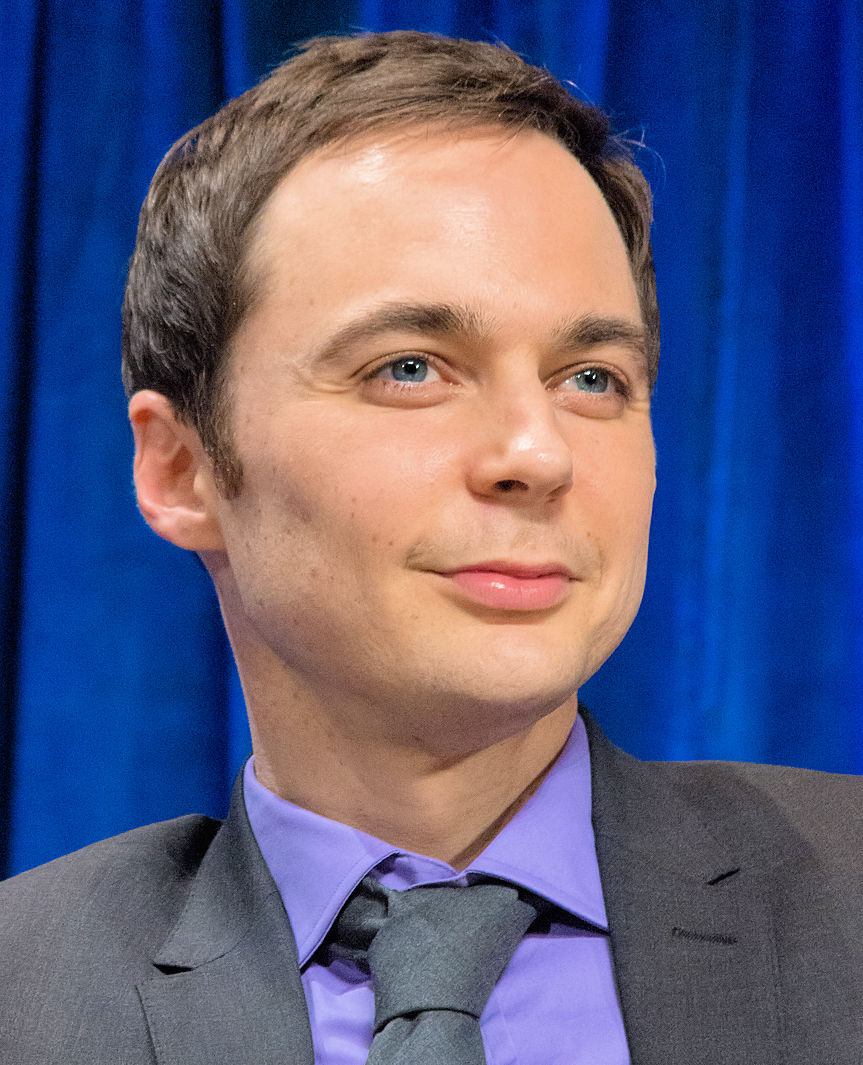
Jim Parsons, 2001 (MFA), actor, Emmy Award-winning actor for The Big Bang Theory

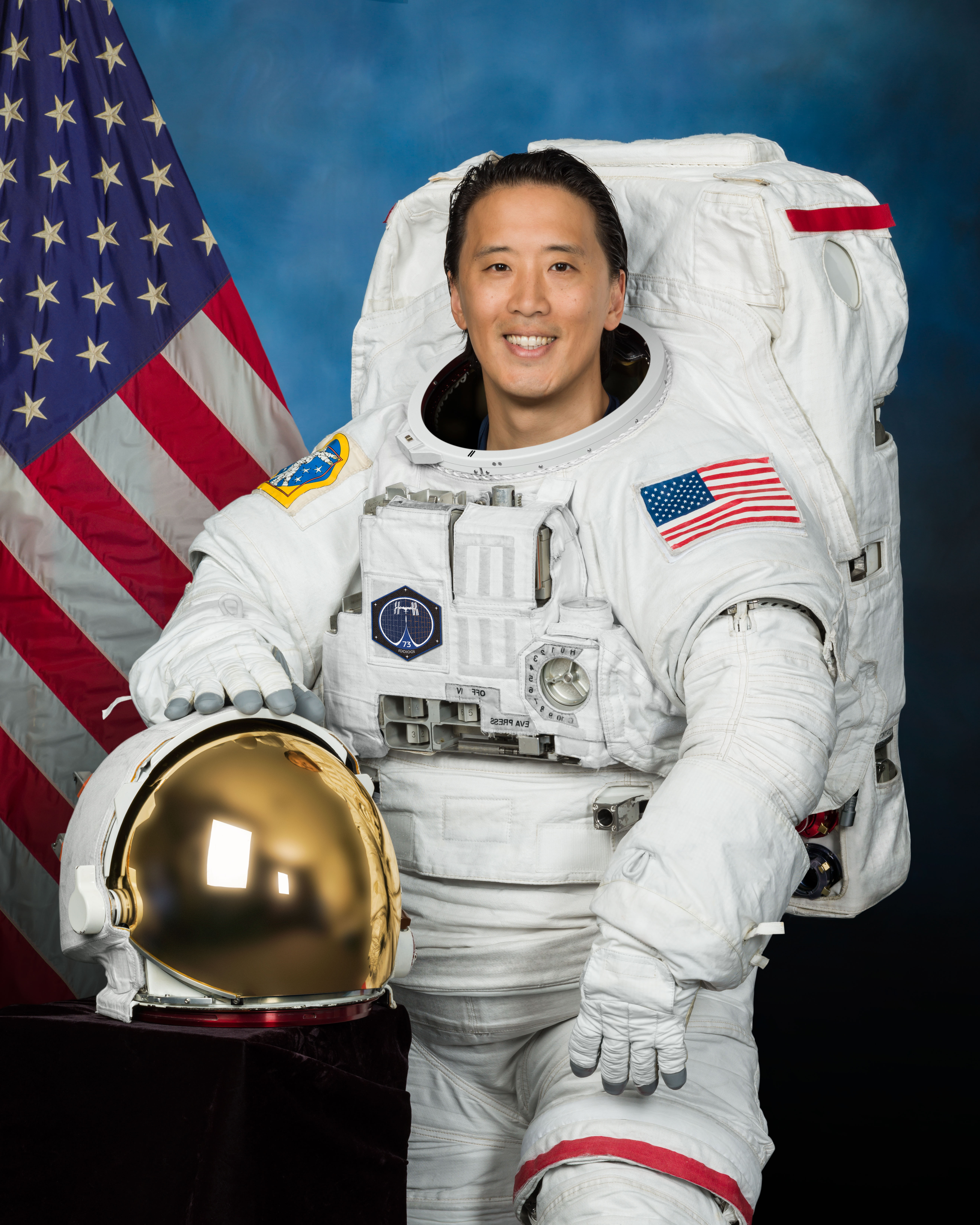
Jonny Kim, 2012, NASA Astronaut and Navy Seal

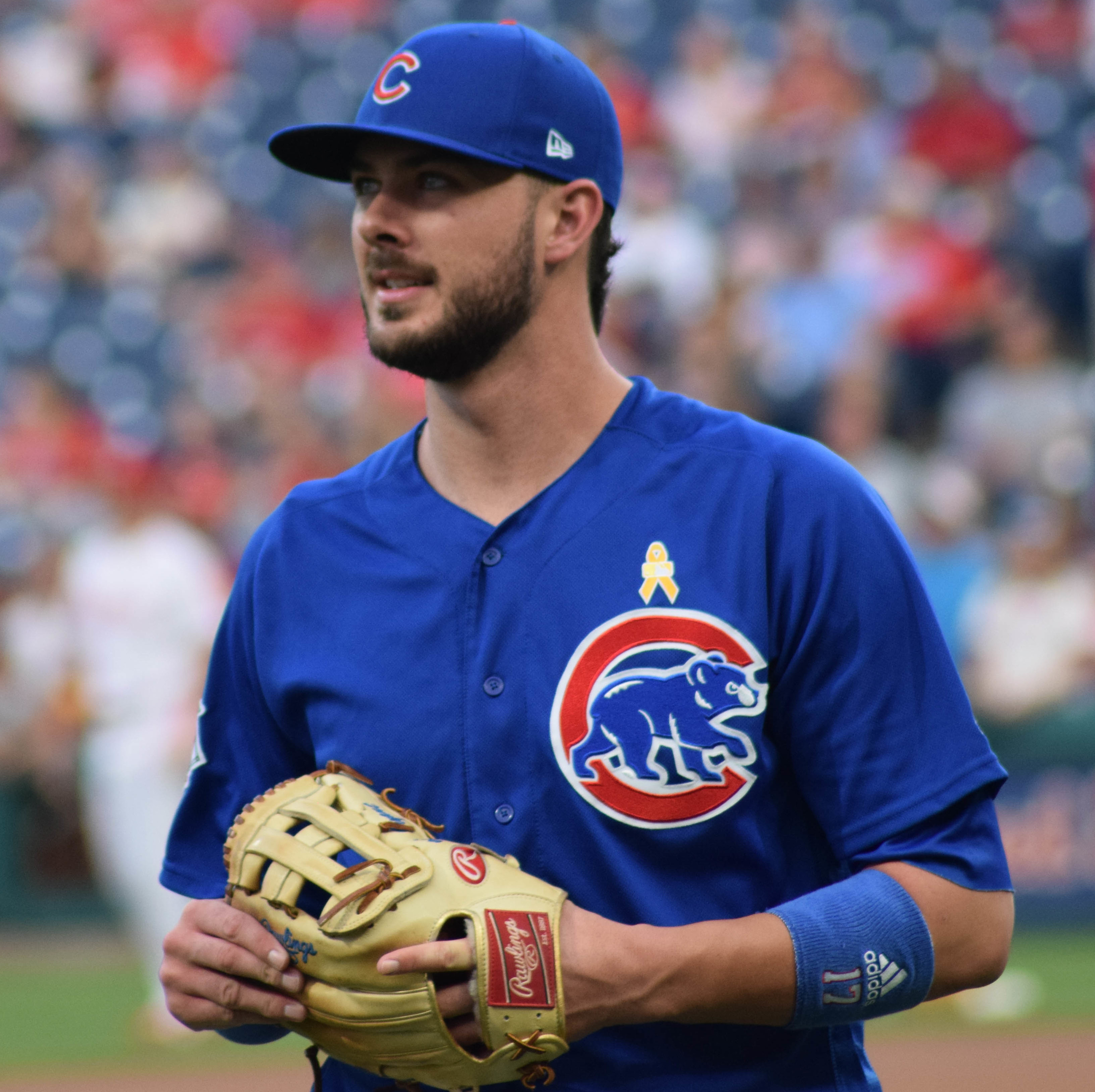
Kris Bryant, 2011–13, baseball player for 2016 World Series champion Chicago Cubs, National League Rookie of the Year (2015) and Most Valuable Player (2016)
- Riley Adams, professional baseball player
- Sattam bin Abdulaziz Al Saud, 1965 (BA), and an honorary doctorate from USD in 1975; one of senior members of House of Saud; son of King Abdulaziz; 12th governor of Riyadh Province, Saudi Arabia
- Alison Armitage, swimmer, actress, and Playboy Playmate
- George Coker, 1976 (BA), retired United States Navy commander awarded the Navy Cross for extraordinary heroism as a prisoner of war during the Vietnam War
- Salvatore Cordileone, 1978 (JCD), Canon Law, Archbishop of San Francisco
- Lorenzo Fertitta, 1991 (BBA), entrepreneur, casino executive, and sports promoter
- Andrew Firestone, 1998 (BBA), television personality and businessman
- Todd Gloria, 2000 (BA), former California State Assembly Member and current mayor of San Diego
- Connor Joe, professional baseball player
- Robert Kardashian, lawyer for O. J. Simpson and father of reality show personalities
- Lowell McAdam, 1983 (MBA), chairman and CEO of Verizon Communications
- Eric Musselman, 1987 (BA), college and professional basketball coach
- Paul Sewald, professional baseball player
- Juan Vargas, 1983 (BA), U.S. Representative for California's 51st congressional district
- John "Jocko" Willink, author, podcaster, and retired United States Navy officer who served in the Navy SEALs
- Richard Wagener, engraver, printer, book designer, publisher of fine press books, Mixolydian Editions
- Ryan Zinke, 2003 (MS), former United States Secretary of the Interior
