= Hums =

Hums may refer to:

- Health and usage monitoring systems (HUMS), a technique to ensure availability, reliability and safety of vehicles
- Thomas Hums (born 1989), a Canadian male track cyclist

== See also ==
- Hum (disambiguation)
- Homs
