= Humming (disambiguation) =

Humming is a noise.

Humming may also refer to:

- Humming (film), 2008
- Humming (album), a 1998 album by Duncan Sheik

== Songs ==
- "Humming", by Kate Bush from The Other Sides, recorded 1975
- "Humming", by Portishead from the self-titled album, 1997
- "Humming", by Turnover from Peripheral Vision, 2015
- "Humming", by Wire from Mind Hive, 2020

== See also ==
- Hum (disambiguation)
