= Lowell McAdam =

American businessman (born 1954)

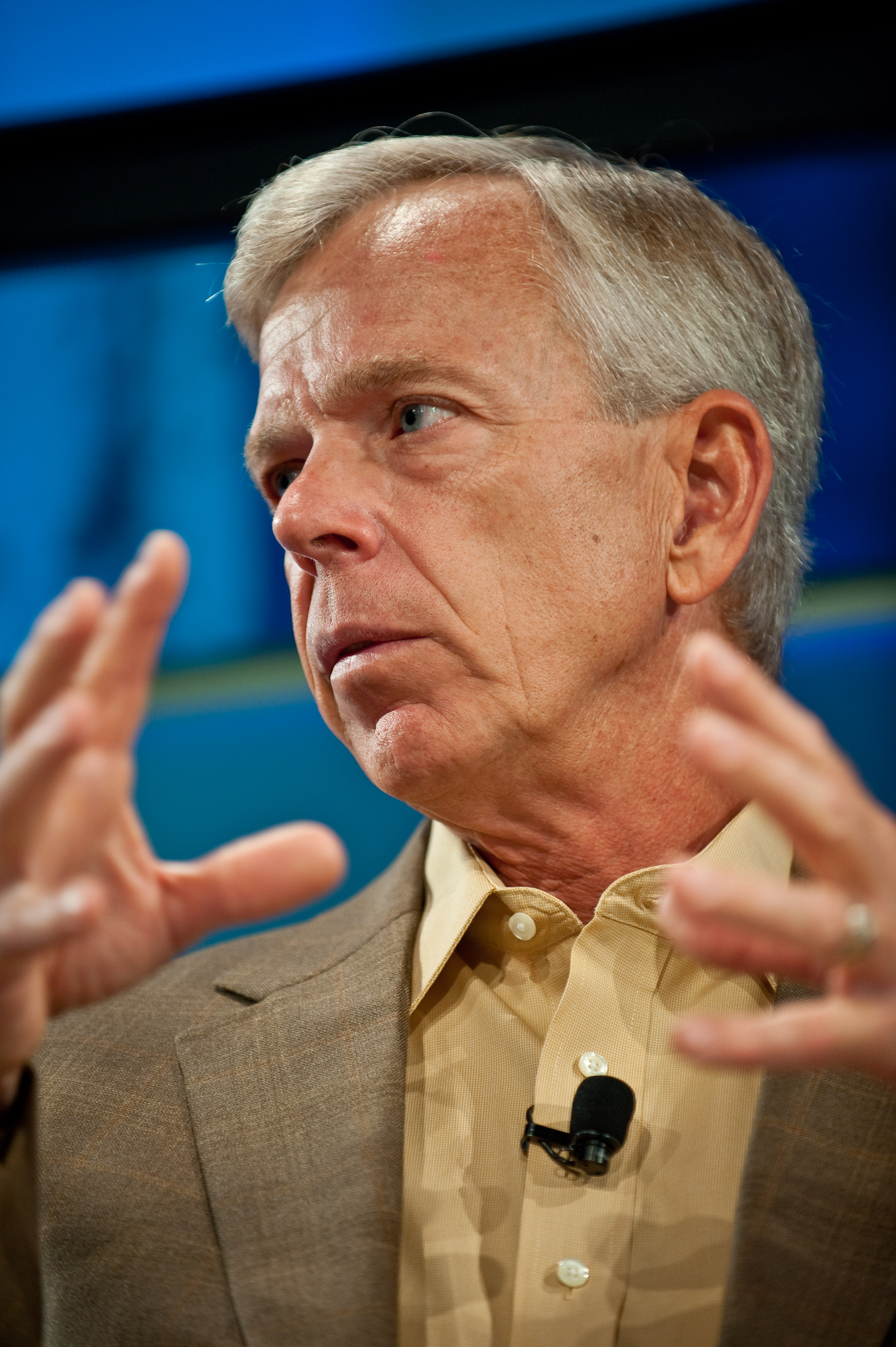
- McAdam in 2011
- Born: May 28, 1954 (age 72); Buffalo, New York, United States
- Education: Cornell University; University of San Diego (MBA)
- Occupations: former Chairman and former CEO of Verizon Communications

Lowell Clayton McAdam (born May 28, 1954) is an American businessman. He is the former chairman and CEO of Verizon Communications, a company he joined in 2000.

== Early life ==
McAdam earned a bachelor's degree in engineering from Cornell University and a master's degree in business administration (MBA) from the University of San Diego.

He spent six years in the U.S. Navy's Civil Engineer Corps and is a licensed professional engineer.

== Career ==
In 2006, McAdam became the chief operating officer (COO) and chief executive officer (CEO) of Verizon Wireless. On September 20, 2010, parent company Verizon Communications announced he would be president and COO beginning October 1, 2010, succeeding Ivan Seidenberg. He was made chairman of Verizon Communications on January 1, 2012, and its CEO on August 1, 2011. In June 2018, Verizon announced that McAdam would retire from his role as CEO on August 1, 2018, remaining executive chairman through the end of the year. He then concluded his tenure as non-executive chairman in March 2019.

McAdam had previously been the CEO for PrimeCo Personal Communications, a joint venture of Bell Atlantic and Vodafone AirTouch. He was vice president of international operations for AirTouch Communications and a lead technical partner for cellular ventures in Spain, Portugal, Sweden, Italy, Korea and Japan. He joined AirTouch as executive director of international applications and operations in 1993. From 1983 to 1993, he held various executive titles with Pacific Bell, including area vice president of Bay Area marketing and general manager of South Bay customer services.

McAdam is past chairman of the board of directors of CTIA – The Wireless Association, a trade association. He is a director of the National Academy Foundation, a partnership between business leaders and educators that aims to help high schools across the US establish and run technical and service academies. He is also co-chair of the CEO Council on Health and Innovation, which encourages affordable improvements in employee health. He is an emeritus member of the Cornell University Board of trustees.

Business positions
Preceded by Ivan G. Seidenberg	Verizon Chairman; 2011–2019	Succeeded by Hans Vestberg
