= Ivan Seidenberg =

American businessman (born 1946)

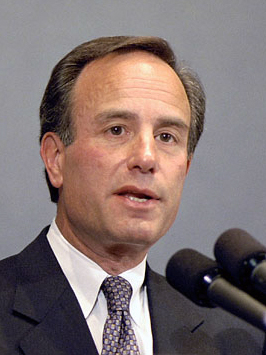
- Seidenberg (Jim Wallace, 2001)
- Born: December 10, 1946 (age 79); New York City, New York, U.S.
- Education: Lehman College; Pace University

Ivan Seidenberg (born December 10, 1946) is the former chairman and CEO of Verizon Communications Inc.

His telecommunications career began more than 40 years ago when he joined New York Telephone, one of Verizon's predecessor companies, as a cable splicer. He went on to lead Verizon from its inception in 2000, first as co-Chief Executive Officer, then as sole CEO, and then as CEO and chairman. Seidenberg stepped down as CEO in July 2011 and continued to serve as chairman and as a member of the Verizon Board of Directors through December 2011 when he retired from the company, succeeded by Lowell McAdam.

Previously, Seidenberg was chairman and CEO of Verizon's predecessor companies, NYNEX and Bell Atlantic.

== Early life ==
Born into a Jewish family, Seidenberg began his career in telecommunications as a cable splicer, straight from high school. He served in the United States Army and was wounded in the Vietnam War. He subsequently earned a bachelor's degree in mathematics from Lehman College, part of the City University of New York, and an MBA from Pace University.

== Career ==
Seidenberg started his career as a cable splicer helper at New York Telephone, eventually becoming head of NYNEX in 1994. He took a senior position in Bell Atlantic after that company merged with NYNEX. When Bell Atlantic became Verizon, Seidenberg was sole CEO of the company.

in 1996 Seidenberg became a Trustee of NewYork–Presbyterian Hospital where, as of 2018, he serves as Vice Chair.

In 2006, Seidenberg donated $15 million to Pace University. Pace's School of Computer Science and Information Systems was officially renamed the Ivan G. Seidenberg School of Computer Science and Information Systems.

In 2007, President George W. Bush named Seidenberg to the National Security Telecommunications Advisory Committee, which advises the president on communications issues related to national security, emergency preparedness and the protection of critical infrastructure.

Seidenberg is a member of the President's Export Council, which advises the President on how to promote U.S. exports, jobs and growth, and the National Security Telecommunications Advisory Committee, which provides counsel on communications issues related to national security. From 2009 to 2011, he chaired the Business Roundtable.

Seidenberg is also a member of the New York Academy of Sciences’ President's Council and serves on the board of trustees of the New York-Presbyterian Hospital, The New York Hall of Science, Pace University, the Paley Center for Media, and on the Board of Directors of BlackRock Inc.

In 2012, Seidenberg joined Perella Weinberg Partners as an advisory partner.

In 2015, Seidenberg joined the Board of Directors of Afiniti, a US based unicorn big data business.

Seidenberg continues his involvement in wireless communication technology businesses as a member of Ingenu's board of directors.

As of 2015, Seidenberg is also a part-owner of the New York Mets baseball franchise.

== Compensation ==
While CEO of Verizon in 2009, Seidenberg earned a total compensation of $17,012,407, which included a base salary of $2,100,000, a cash bonus of $2,953,125, stocks granted of $11,079,000, no options granted, and other compensation of $880,282.

== Controversy ==
On October 14, 2008, Ivan Seidenberg stated as reported in the WSJ: "Verizon CEO No Bailout for Me, Thanks," Seidenberg clearly indicated that Verizon was in great shape and would not take any TARP money. Despite subsequent allegations and reports to the contrary, Verizon did not take TARP money. The Federal Reserve Bank bought $1.5 billion of Verizon's short term (90 days) commercial paper. The funds for the purchase of the short term IOUs, from several corporations, did not come from the TARP program.

== Personal life ==
Seidenberg and his wife, Phyllis, have two adult children and reside in the New York City suburbs.

Business positions
Preceded by Company formed by merger between GTE and Bell Atlantic (where he was CEO) (and CEO of NYNEX since 1994 before its merger to become Bell Atlantic)	Verizon CEO; 2000–2011; Co-CEO with GTE's Charles Lee 2000-2002; Sole CEO 2002-2011	Succeeded by Lowell McAdam
