= San Diego College for Women =

Catholic college, after merger became University of San Diego

The San Diego College for Women was a private Catholic women's college in San Diego, California. In 1972, it merged with San Diego University, a men's college founded by the Roman Catholic Diocese of San Diego, to form the coeducational University of San Diego.

== History ==
San Diego College was founded by the Mother Rosalie Hill, superior vicar of the Society of the Sacred Heart, in 1950. It first opened to students in February 1952, enrolling about 33 students and having a staff of nine. The first president was Mother Catherine Parks, with Hill serving as honorary president. The first College for Women graduate was Therese Truitt Whitcomb, Class of 1953, though the first ceremony was not held until the next year when nine degrees were granted.

In 1956, Mother Frances Danz was named the president of the college. Within her first year, the college received full accreditation from the State of California and established a nursing program in collaboration with nearby Mercy College of Nursing. The college expanded again two years later, offering its first graduate degrees in 1958.

Mother Anne Farraher became president of the college in 1963. Two years later, following the Second Vatican Council that encouraged Catholic educational institutions to "unite in a mutual sharing of effort," the San Diego College for Women and San Diego University began to consider combining their resources. Mother Nancy Morris became president in 1968, and by 1969 had introduced coeducational classes in cooperation with the College for Men. That same year, the colleges also combined their graduation ceremonies for the first time.

Citing financial deficits and a desire to share more resources, the San Diego College for Women fully merged with the College for Men and the School of Law in 1972.

== See also ==
- List of current and historical women's universities and colleges in the United States
- Schools of the Sacred Heart
