= Shiley–Marcos School of Engineering =

Engineering school of the University of San Diego

The Shiley–Marcos School of Engineering is the engineering school of the University of San Diego (USD), a private Roman Catholic university in San Diego, California. Established in 2013, the school offers undergraduate and graduate programs in engineering and computer science and is known for its interdisciplinary curriculum and dual-degree structure.

== History ==
Engineering programs at the University of San Diego began in 1987 as a departmental offering before expanding into a standalone school in 2013, following a $20 million gift from philanthropist Darlene Marcos Shiley.

Since its establishment, the school has undergone significant expansion in programs, enrollment, and facilities. By the late 2010s, the school had grown in both student population and academic offerings.

In 2015, the school received a $2 million grant from the National Science Foundation as part of its "Revolutionizing Engineering Departments" initiative to reform engineering education and increase participation from underrepresented groups.

In 2018, the school received a $10 million gift to expand and renovate its facilities, leading to the development of the Belanich Engineering Center.

In 2024, Darlene Marcos Shiley pledged $75 million to support STEM initiatives at USD, including expanded facilities, research opportunities, and interdisciplinary programs connected to the engineering school.

== Campus and facilities ==
The school is primarily housed in the Belanich Engineering Center on the USD campus. The complex includes laboratories, innovation spaces, and collaborative learning environments designed to support hands-on engineering education and industry collaboration.

Planned and ongoing expansions associated with the Shiley STEM Initiative include new interdisciplinary STEM facilities, makerspaces, and expanded laboratory infrastructure.

== Academics ==
The Shiley–Marcos School of Engineering offers undergraduate programs in disciplines including computer science, electrical engineering, industrial and systems engineering, integrated engineering, and mechanical engineering.

Graduate programs include fields such as applied artificial intelligence, applied data science, and cybersecurity engineering.

A distinguishing feature of the school is its dual Bachelor of Science/Bachelor of Arts (BS/BA) degree requirement, which integrates engineering education with liberal arts coursework and emphasizes communication and interdisciplinary skills.

All undergraduate engineering programs are accredited by the Accreditation Board for Engineering and Technology (ABET).

== Rankings and reputation ==
The Shiley–Marcos School of Engineering has been ranked among the top undergraduate engineering programs at institutions that do not offer doctoral degrees by U.S. News & World Report. The school has been reported as ranking No. 12 nationally in this category.

The school has also been noted for its focus on project-based learning, interdisciplinary curriculum, and relatively small class sizes compared to larger engineering programs.

== Programs and approach ==
The school emphasizes interdisciplinary and project-based learning, including capstone design experiences and collaborative research opportunities.

Through initiatives supported by the National Science Foundation, the school has incorporated coursework connecting engineering with social, environmental, and global challenges, with an emphasis on diversity and inclusion in engineering education.

The curriculum aligns with USD’s broader "Changemaker" mission, focusing on ethical leadership, social impact, and global awareness in engineering practice.

== See also ==
- University of San Diego
- Engineering education
