= Fleetmatics =

Fleetmatics Group PLC
- Company type: Subsidiary
- Industry: SaaS Fleet management software
- Founded: 2004
- Defunct: 6 March 2018
- Fate: Rebranded as Verizon Connect
- Headquarters: Dublin, Ireland (Global HQ); Waltham, Massachusetts (United States HQ)
- Owner: Verizon Consumer (Verizon)
- Number of employees: 3000+ (as of 2018)
- Parent: Verizon Connect
- Subsidiaries: SageQuest; Visirun; Inosat Global; Communicate 2 Field; TrackEasy
- Website: fleetmatics.com

Fleetmatics was a provider of software-as-a-service (SaaS) for fleet management, a key component of Fleet digitalization. Based in Dublin, Ireland, the company offered web-based and mobile application services that provided fleet operators with information on vehicle location, speed, mileage, and fuel usage. Verizon was one the largest GPS fleet management system globally (alongside Wialon and Geotab) with over 1.8 million vehicles managed through over 80,000 customers. Fleetmatics also provides field management, job scheduling and workflow services.

== History ==
Fleetmatics Group PLC, founded in 2004, was a provider of fleet management services delivered as software-as-a-service. In 2010, FleetMatics acquired the US software company SageQuest LLC, which provided GPS vehicle management tools for utility, cable, and broadband companies throughout North America. In 2016, FleetMatics expanded its Southern Europe presence with the acquisition of Inosat Global.

On 1 August 2016, Verizon announced its intention to acquire Fleetmatics for $2.4 billion in cash to expand its Telematics services, and the deal was completed in November 2016.

In October 2017, Fleetmatics registered its Electronic Logging Device (ELD) for Android with the Federal Motor Carrier Safety Administration (FMCSA).

On 6 March 2018, Fleetmatics and its sister companies, Telogis and Verizon Telematics, were rebranded as Verizon Connect.
