= Hum =

Hum or HUM may refer to:

== Science ==
- Hum (sound), a sound produced with closed lips, or by insects, or other periodic motion
- Mains hum, an electric or electromagnetic phenomenon
- The Hum, an acoustic phenomenon
- Venous hum, a physiological sensation

== Arts, entertainment, and media ==
=== Music ===
- Hum (band), a band from Champaign, Illinois, US
- The Hum (Hookworms album), 2014
- The Hum (O'Hooley & Tidow album), 2014
- Hum (Eerie Wanda album), 2016
- "Hum", 2014 song by Tigers Jaw from Charmer
- "The Hum" (Dimitri Vegas & Like Mike song), 2015
- The Hum, Unwritten Law album
- "Hums", a song by Swans from Leaving Meaning

=== Other uses in arts, entertainment, and media ===
- Hum (film), a 1991 Bollywood film
- Hum – I'm Because of Us, an Indian web series
- Highly unusual method, or HUM, in contract bridge
- Hum FM, an Emirati radio station
- Hum TV, a Pakistani television channel

== Places ==
=== Historical ===
- Hum (zemlja), a medieval principality, now part of Bosnia and Herzegovina and Croatia

=== Bosnia and Herzegovina ===
- Mount Hum (Sarajevo), a hill north of Sarajevo
- Mount Hum (Mostar), a hill south of Mostar
- Hum, Bugojno, a village in the Federation of Bosnia and Herzegovina
- Hum, Foča, a village in Republika Srpska
- Hum, Trebinje, a village in Republika Srpska

=== Croatia ===
- Hum, Istria County, a town in Istria
- Hum, Virovitica-Podravina County, a village near Voćin
- Hum na Sutli, a village and municipality in Krapina-Zagorje County
- Mount Hum (Lastovo), a hill on the island of Lastovo in Dalmatia
- Mount Hum (Plaški), a hill in the region of mountainous Croatia
- Mount Hum (Vis), a hill on the island of Vis in Dalmatia

=== Elsewhere ===
- Hum (Niš), a village in Serbia
- Hum (Pešter), a mountain on the border of Serbia and Montenegro
- Mount Hum (Laško), a hill in Styria, Slovenia
- Hum, Brda, a village in the Littoral region of Slovenia
- Hum Island near Antarctica
- HUM, the Chapman code for Humberside, former county in England, United Kingdom
- HUM, the IATA code for Houma–Terrebonne Airport, in Louisiana, United States

== People ==
- Hum Jayega (1922–1992), Nepali Indian comedian
- Christopher Hum (born 1946), British diplomat
- Nicholas Hum (1993–2025), Australian Paralympic athlete
- Phan Văn Hùm (1902–1946), Vietnamese Trotskyist

== Other uses ==
- Honda of the UK Manufacturing, British motor vehicle assembler
- Verizon Hum, a vehicle diagnostic and tracking system

== See also ==
- Human
