= Hum (system) =

- Developer: Verizon Communications
- Released: August 26, 2015; 10 years ago
- CPU: MODEM/Baseband processor + AP – VIA Telecom CBP8.2
- Connectivity: ODB II
- Power: 1000mAh battery
- Dimensions: Reader: 2.24" (H) × 1.90" (W) × 1.00" (D), Speaker: 4.45" (H) × 2.44" (W) × .90" (D)
- Weight: 1.41 oz
- Website: www.hum.com

Hum was a vehicle diagnostic and tracking system from Verizon Communications. The system was composed of two devices: a diagnostics reader which connects to a vehicle's OBDII and a speaker with Bluetooth connectivity that can be clipped to the visor. A monthly subscription was required, but also includes a mobile application for reviewing collected data and receiving alerts as well as roadside assistance. The Hum was first revealed in January 2015 under the name Verizon Vehicle, but was rebranded before its release in August of that year.

Hum was discontinued on December 31, 2025.

The initial product launch included features such as maintenance reminders, parking assistance, incident alerts, emergency assistance and stolen vehicle location assistance. In 2016 Verizon added location-based features that were marketed to parents as a way of keeping track of teen driving habits. The newer features allow users to set alerts for when the vehicle exceeds certain speeds or goes outside of set geographical boundaries (called geo-fencing). A new model, Hum X, was launched in March 2017, featuring Wi-Fi hotspot capability, and priced at $15/month.
