= Verizon =

American telecommunications company

Verizon Communications Inc.
- Logo used since 2024 (Note: Wordmark used since 2015)

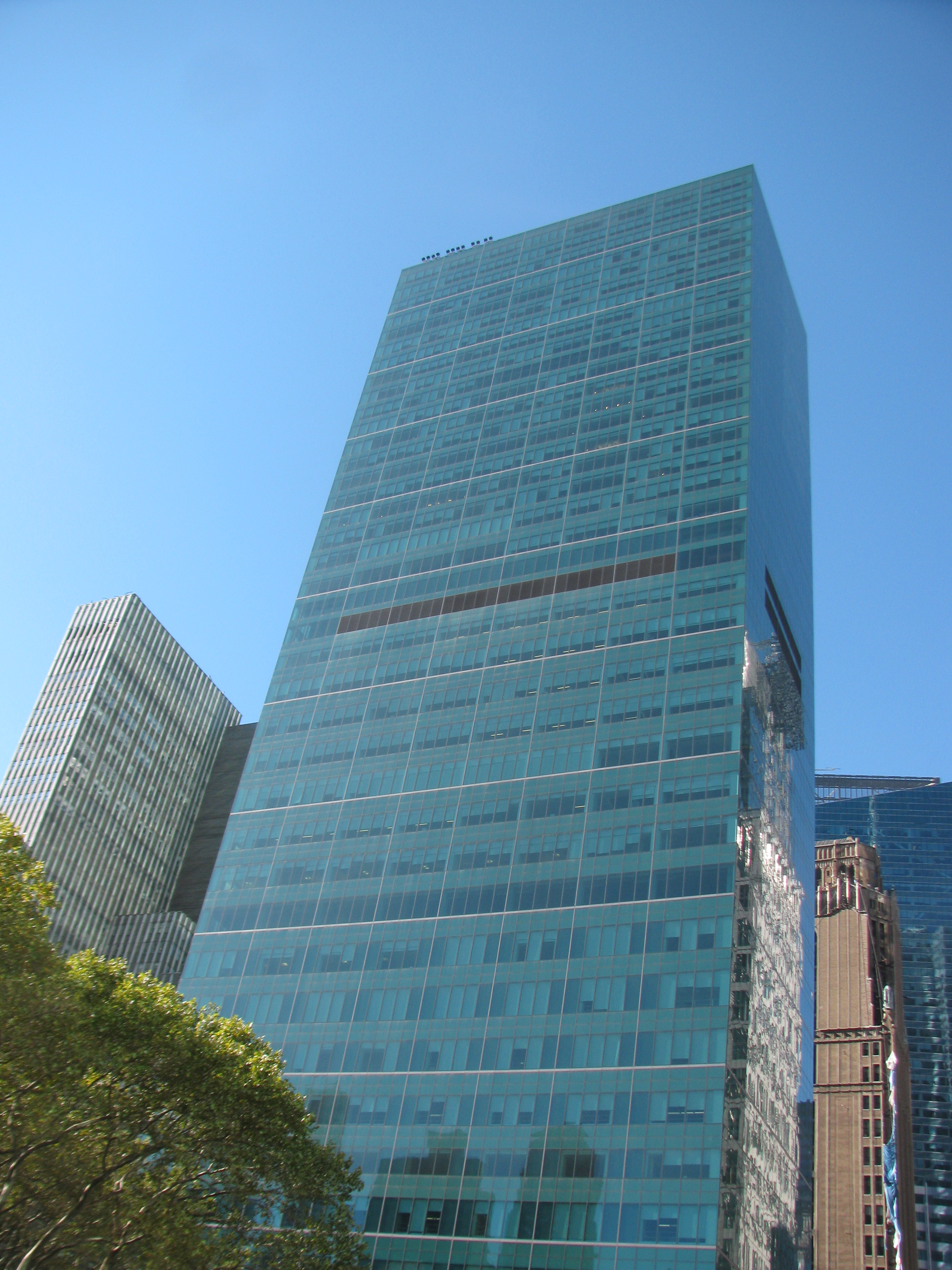
- Headquarters in New York
- Formerly: Bell Atlantic Corporation (1983–2000) (Note: According to SEC filings and publicly accessible state corporation databases such as the New York State Division of Corporations, Verizon is using the original legal entity that was previously called Bell Atlantic Corporation. After Bell Atlantic's acquisitions of NYNEX and GTE, Bell Atlantic legally renamed itself to Verizon Communications Inc in 2000. Therefore, the official start date remains 1983 as opposed to the renaming date in 2000. It is still operating as the same legal entity since 1983.)
- Type: Public
- Traded as: NYSE: VZ; S&P 100 component; S&P 500 component
- ISIN: US92343V1044
- Industry: Telecommunications
- Predecessors: NYNEX Corporation; GTE Corporation
- Founded: October 7, 1983; 43 years ago
- Headquarters: 1095 Avenue of the Americas, New York City, U.S.
- Area served: United States (consumer services); Worldwide (business services)
- Key people: Mark Bertolini (chairman); Dan Schulman (CEO); Tony Skiadas (CFO / EVP)
- Products: Fixed telephony; Mobile telephony; Broadband; Digital television; Internet television; IPTV; IoT
- Revenue: ▲US$138.2 billion (2025)
- Operating income: ▲US$29.26 billion (2025)
- Net income: ▼US$17.61 billion (2025)
- Total assets: ▲US$404.3 billion (2025)
- Total equity: ▲US$105.7 billion (2025)
- Number of employees: 89,900 (2025)
- Subsidiaries: Verizon Wireless; Verizon Fios; Verizon Value; Visible by Verizon; Frontier Communications; Yahoo (10%)
- Website: verizon.com

Verizon Communications Inc. (/vəˈraɪzən/ və-RY-zən) is an American telecommunications company headquartered in New York City. It is the world's second-largest telecommunications company by revenue and its mobile network is the largest wireless carrier in the United States, with 146.8 million subscribers as of March 31, 2026. The company was founded as Bell Atlantic Corporation and renamed to Verizon on June 30, 2000 as a result of a merger with GTE. (Note: Verizon uses terms "created" or "formed" to describe its corporation renaming after the Bell Atlantic, GTE, and NYNEX mergers, however, officially it was only a legal name change and rebrand.)

Bell Atlantic was originally headquartered in Philadelphia and operated in the states of Pennsylvania, New Jersey, Delaware, Maryland, Virginia, and West Virginia. In 1997, the company expanded into New York and the New England states by merging with fellow Baby Bell NYNEX. While Bell Atlantic was the surviving company, it moved its head office to NYNEX's old headquarters in New York City. In 2000, Bell Atlantic merged with GTE, which operated telecommunications companies across most of the rest of the country not already in Bell Atlantic's footprint.

In 2015, Verizon expanded into content ownership by acquiring AOL, and two years later, it acquired Yahoo! Inc. AOL and Yahoo were amalgamated into a new division named Oath Inc., which was rebranded as Verizon Media in January 2019, and was spun off and rebranded to Yahoo! Inc. after its sale to Apollo Global Management.

As of 2026, Verizon is one of three remaining companies with roots in the former Baby Bells. The other two, like Verizon, exist as a result of mergers among fellow former Baby Bell members. SBC Communications bought the Bells' former parent AT&T Corporation and began using the AT&T name, while CenturyLink acquired Qwest (formerly US West) in 2011, renaming to Lumen Technologies in 2020; only for AT&T to reacquire the broadband business of Lumen in February 2026.

== History ==
=== Bell Atlantic mergers and rebrand to Verizon (1983–2002) ===
In 1983, the US Department of Justice reached a settlement with the original AT&T to break up the Bell System. Bell Atlantic Corporation was created as one of the original "Baby Bell" Regional Bell Operating Companies (RBOCs).

Bell Atlantic's original roster of operating companies included:

- The Bell Telephone Company of Pennsylvania
- New Jersey Bell
- Diamond State Telephone
- C&P Telephone (itself comprising four subsidiaries)

In 1996, CEO and Chairman Raymond W. Smith orchestrated Bell Atlantic's merger with fellow Baby Bell NYNEX, which had received New York Telephone and New England Telephone in the breakup. When it merged, it moved its corporate headquarters from Philadelphia to New York City. NYNEX was consolidated into the Bell Atlantic name by 1997.

First logo used from June 30, 2000 to September 1, 2015

In April 2000, two months before the Federal Communications Commission (FCC) gave final approval on the merger with GTE, Bell Atlantic formed Verizon Wireless in a joint venture with the British telecommunications company Vodafone, which owned the mobile operator AirTouch. The companies established Verizon Wireless as its own business operated by Bell Atlantic, which owned 55% of the venture. Vodafone retained 45% of the company. The deal was valued at approximately $70 billion and created a mobile carrier with 23 million customers. Verizon Wireless merged Bell Atlantic's wireless network, Vodafone's AirTouch and PrimeCo holdings, and the wireless division of GTE. Due to its size, Verizon Wireless was able to offer national coverage at competitive rates, giving it an advantage over regional providers typical of the time.

Bell Atlantic became Verizon Communications in June 2000, when the FCC approved the merger with telephone company GTE, nearly two years after the deal was proposed in July 1998. The merger was announced on April 4. The name Verizon derives from the combination of the words veritas, Latin for truth, and horizon.

The approval came with 25 stipulations to preserve competition between local phone carriers, including investing in new markets and broadband technologies. The new entity was headed by co-CEOs Charles Lee, former CEO of GTE, and Bell Atlantic CEO Ivan Seidenberg.

Verizon became the largest local telephone company in the United States, operating 63 million telephone lines in 40 states. The company also inherited 25 million mobile phone customers. Additionally, Verizon offered internet services and long-distance calling in New York, before expanding long-distance operations to other states.

Approximately 85,000 Verizon workers went on an 18-day labor strike in August 2000 after their union contracts expired. The strike affected quarterly revenues, resulting in Verizon Wireless's postponement of the company's initial public offering (IPO) (the IPO was ultimately cancelled in 2003 because the company no longer needed to raise revenue for Verizon Wireless due to increased profits), and created a backlog of repairs. This strike did not involve all company employees, as most line technicians and user technicians of the company are in a union.

Verizon launched 3G service in 2002, which doubled the Internet speed of the time to 144 kb per second. In August 2002, Verizon began offering local, long-distance, and mobile calling, as well as Internet service, in a bundle. It was initially only available to customers in New York and Massachusetts.

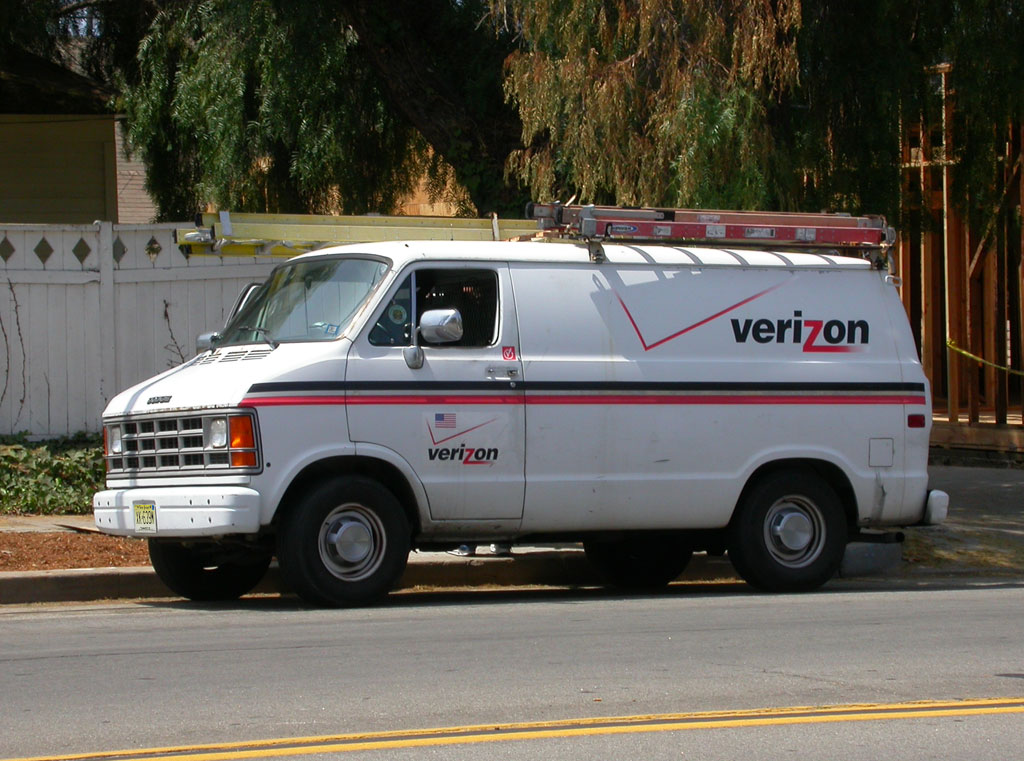
Service van with Verizon's former logo and livery

=== Growth (2003–2010) ===
The Dow Jones Industrial Average added Verizon Communications to its stock market index in April 2004. Verizon replaced telecom competitor AT&T, which had been a part of the index since the Great Depression.

Verizon launched its Fios Internet service, which transmits data over fiber optic cables, in Keller, Texas, in 2004. The company launched Fios TV in September 2005, also in Keller. Twenty percent of qualified homes had signed up by the end of 2004. By January 2006, Fios offered over 350 channels in seven states, including 20 high-definition television channels and video on demand.

Mail servers at Verizon.net were configured in December 2004 to not accept connections from Europe by default in an attempt to reduce spam email that was originating from the region. Individual domains would only be unblocked upon request. The move was criticized by its customers for disrupting their communications without notice, causing them to initiate a class-action lawsuit. Verizon proposed a settlement in April 2006.

Beginning in 2005, Verizon reinforced its focus on its mobile phone, Internet, and TV businesses by selling a number of its U.S.-based wireline-focused businesses and international assets. It sold 700,000 lines in Hawaii in 2005, and spun off lines in Maine, New Hampshire and Vermont in January 2007, which were then purchased by FairPoint Communications for $2.72 billion. Verizon also shed its telephone directory business in 2006. In May 2009, the company spun off wirelines in Arizona, Idaho, Illinois, Indiana, Michigan, Nevada, North Carolina, Ohio, Oregon, South Carolina, Washington, West Virginia, and Wisconsin into a company that then merged with Frontier Communications in a deal valued at $8.6 billion. It sold its interests in telecommunications providers in the Dominican Republic (Verizon Dominicana, previously CODETEL), Puerto Rico and Venezuela to América Móvil. A decade later, it would continue moves to invest in wireless. In 2015, American Tower Corp. acquired the exclusive right to lease, acquire or otherwise operate and manage many of Verizon's wireless towers for an upfront payment of $5.1 billion, which also included payment for the sale of approximately 165 towers. Verizon used the funds from this sale to support a $10.4 billion purchase of AWS-3 spectrum licenses at an FCC auction. In 2016, Verizon sold its wireline operations in Texas, Florida, and California to Frontier.

Verizon began negotiations in 2005 to purchase long-distance carrier MCI, who accepted the company's initial $6.75 billion offer in February but then received a higher offer from Qwest Communications. Verizon increased its bid to $7.6 billion, which MCI accepted on March 29, 2005. The acquisition gave the company access to MCI's million corporate clients and international holdings, expanding Verizon's presence into global markets. As a result, Verizon Business was established as a new division to serve the company's business and government customers. The FCC approved the deal on October 31, 2005, valuing it at $8.5 billion. Verizon's 2006 revenues rose by as much as 20% following the purchase.

USA Today reported in May 2006 that Verizon, as well as AT&T and BellSouth, had given the National Security Agency landline phone records following the September 11 attacks. That same month, a $50 billion lawsuit was filed by two lawyers on behalf of all Verizon subscribers for privacy violations and to prevent the company from releasing additional records without consent or warrant. Protesters staged the National Day of Out(R)age due in part to the controversy. In 2007, Verizon stated that it fulfilled only "lawful demands" for information, but also acknowledged surrendering customer information to government agencies without court orders or warrants 720 times between 2005 and 2007.

Verizon won a lawsuit against Vonage for patent infringement in March 2007. The three patents named were filed by Bell Atlantic in 1997, and relate to the conversion of IP addresses into phone numbers, a key technology of Vonage's business. The company was awarded US$58 million in damages and future royalties. Vonage later lost an appeal and was ordered to pay Verizon $120 million.

In May 2007, Verizon acquired CyberTrust, a privately held provider of global information security services.

In September 2007, Verizon Wireless reversed a controversial decision to deny NARAL Pro-Choice America a short code through which the organization could text consumers who had signed up for messaging from the group. The company had initially refused the group access to a code by reserving the right to block "controversial or unsavory" messages.

Verizon opened its networks to third party apps and devices for the first time in 2007, a decision that allowed it to participate in the FCC's 2008 700 MHz auction of "open access" spectrum. During that auction, the company bid $9.4 billion and won the bulk of national and local licenses for airwaves reaching approximately 469 million people. Verizon utilized the increased spectrum for its 4G service.

Verizon acquired Rural Cellular Corp. for $2.7 billion in cash and assumed debt in 2008. That summer, Verizon announced it would purchase wireless carrier Alltel for $28.1 billion. The acquisition included 13 million customers, which allowed Verizon Wireless to surpass AT&T in number of customers and reach new markets in rural areas.

4chan began receiving reports on February 4, 2010, from Verizon Wireless customers that were having difficulties accessing the site's image boards. Administrators of the site found that only traffic on port 80 to the boards.4chan.org domain was affected, leading them to believe the block was intentional. On February 7, 2010, Verizon Wireless confirmed that 4chan.org was "explicitly blocked" after Verizon's security and external experts detected sweep attacks coming from an IP address associated with the 4chan network. Traffic was restored several days later.

The chairmen of Verizon and Google agreed that network neutrality should be defined and limited in August 2010.

In October 2010, Verizon Wireless paid $77.8 million in refunds and FCC penalties for overcharging 15 million customers for data services. The company stated the overcharges were accidental and only amounted to a few dollars per customer.

Verizon introduced its 4G LTE network in 38 markets, as well as airports in seven additional cities in December 2010. The company planned on a three-year continuous expansion of the 4G service.

=== Expansion of services (2011–2021) ===
Verizon logo used from September 2, 2015 to June 25, 2024. Still used as a secondary logo without a checkmark.

Verizon acquired Terremark, an information technology services company, for $1.4 billion in early 2011.

Ivan Seidenberg retired as Verizon's CEO on August 1, 2011, and was succeeded by Lowell McAdam.

In December 2011, the non-partisan organization Public Campaign criticized Verizon for its tax avoidance procedures after it spent $52.34 million on lobbying while collecting $951 million in tax rebates between 2008 and 2010 and making a profit of $32.5 billion. The same report also criticized Verizon for increasing executive pay by 167% in 2010 for its top five executives while laying off 21,308 workers between 2008 and 2010. However, in its Form 10-K filed with the SEC on February 24, 2012, Verizon reported having paid more than $11.1 billion in taxes (including income, employment and property taxes) from 2009 to 2011. In addition, the company reported in the 10-K that most of the drop in employment since 2008 was due to a voluntary retirement offer.

Verizon purchased Hughes Telematics, a producer of wireless features for automobiles, for $612 million in June 2012 as part of its strategy to expand into new growth areas in its wireless business. The same month, Verizon's E-911 service failed in the aftermath of the June 2012 derecho storm in several northern Virginia suburbs of Washington, D.C., with some problems lasting several days. The FCC conducted an investigation and released a report detailing the problems that led to the failure in January 2013. Verizon reported that it had already addressed or was addressing a number of the issues related to the FCC report, including the causes of generator failures, conducting audits of backup systems, and making its monitoring systems less centralized, although the FCC indicated that Verizon still needed to make additional improvements.

The FCC ruled that Verizon must stop charging users an added fee for using 4G smartphones and tablets as Wi-Fi hotspots (known as "tethering"). Verizon had been charging its customers, even those with "unlimited" plans, $20 per month for tethering. As part of the 2012 settlement, Verizon made a voluntary payment of $1.25 million to the U.S. Treasury.

In August 2012, the Department of Justice approved Verizon's purchase of Advanced Wireless Services (AWS) spectrum from a consortium of cable companies, including Comcast, Time Warner Cable and Bright House Networks, for $3.9 billion. Verizon began expanding its LTE network utilizing these extra airwaves in October 2013.

The Guardian reported it had obtained an order by the Federal Bureau of Investigation (FBI) and approved by the United States Foreign Intelligence Surveillance Court that required Verizon to provide the National Security Agency (NSA) with telephone metadata for all calls originating in the U.S. Verizon Wireless was not part of the NSA data collection for wireless accounts due to foreign ownership issues.

Verizon purchased Vodafone's 45% stake in Verizon in September 2013 for $130 billion. The deal closed on February 21, 2014, and became the third largest corporate deal ever signed, giving Verizon Communications sole ownership of Verizon Wireless.

On January 14, 2014, the DC Circuit Court of Appeals struck down the FCC's net neutrality rules after Verizon filed suit against them in January 2010. In June 2016, in a 184-page ruling, the United States Court of Appeals for the District of Columbia Circuit upheld, by a 2–1 vote, the FCC's net neutrality rules and the FCC's determination that broadband access is a public utility rather than a luxury. AT&T and the telecom industry said they would seek to appeal the decision to the Supreme Court.

The Wall Street Journal reported that Verizon received more than 1,000 requests for information about its subscribers on national security grounds via National Security Letters. In total, Verizon received 321,545 requests from federal, state and local law enforcement for U.S. customer information. In May 2015, Verizon agreed to pay $90 million "to settle federal and state investigations into allegations mobile customers were improperly billed for premium text messages".

Verizon Wireless launched the technology news website SugarString in October 2014. The publication attracted controversy after it was reported that its writers were forbidden from publishing articles related to net neutrality or domestic surveillance. Although Verizon denied that this was the case, the site (described as being a pilot project) was shuttered in December.

Verizon acquired AOL in 2015 at $50 per share, for a deal valued around $4.4 billion. The following year, Verizon announced it would acquire the core internet business of Yahoo! for $4.83 billion. Following the completion of the acquisitions, Verizon created a new division called Oath, which includes the AOL and Yahoo brands. The sale did not include Yahoo's stakes in Alibaba Group and Yahoo! Japan.The integrated AOL-Yahoo operation, housed under the newly created Oath division, would be organized around key content-based pillars.Verizon completed its acquisition of Yahoo for $4.48 billion on June 13, 2017.

In May 2015, cybersecurity researcher Blake Welsh disclosed a flaw in Verizon's systems that left millions of home internet users vulnerable to account information leaks.

In August 2015, Verizon launched Hum, a service and device offering vehicle diagnostic and monitoring tools for vehicles. On August 1, 2016, Verizon announced its acquisition of Fleetmatics, a fleet telematics system company in Dublin, Ireland, for $2.4 billion, to build products that it offers to enterprises for logistics and mobile workforces. On September 12, 2016, Verizon announced its acquisition of Sensity, a startup for LED sensors, in an effort to bolster its IoT portfolio. A few months later, Verizon acquired mapping startup SocialRadar, whose technology would be integrated with MapQuest.

Verizon was accused by Communications Workers of America of deliberately refusing to maintain its copper telephone service in 2016. The organization released internal memos and other documents stating that Verizon workers in Pennsylvania were being instructed to, in areas with network problems, migrate voice-only customers to VoiceLink, a system that delivers telephone service over the Verizon Wireless network, instead of repairing the copper lines. VoiceLink has limitations, including incompatibility with services or devices that require the transmission of data over the telephone line, and a dependency on battery backup in case of power failure. The memo warned that technicians who do not follow this procedure would be subject to "disciplinary action up to and including dismissal". A Verizon spokesperson responded to the allegations, stating that the company's top priority was to restore service to customers as quickly as possible, and that VoiceLink was a means of doing so in the event that larger repairs had to be done to the infrastructure. The spokesperson stated that it was "hard to argue with disciplining someone who intentionally leaves a customer without service".

Verizon was reported to be in talks with Charter Communications in January 2017 to discuss a possible buyout. Charter reportedly rejected the deal around the end of May 2017, citing that the offer was too low for them to accept, and its largest shareholder Liberty Media stated that they were not ready to sell.

Verizon CEO Lowell McAdam in 2017 confirmed the company planned to launch a streaming TV service.

Verizon added to its fiber-optic network and 5G capabilities in February 2017 when it closed its $1.8 billion acquisition of XO Communications' fiber-optic network business. Verizon and Corning Inc. announced a deal in April 2017 whereby Verizon would purchase 12.4 million miles of optical fiber per year from Corning from 2018 through 2020. Months later, Verizon purchased WideOpenWest's fiber-optic assets in the Chicago market for $225 million.

Also in 2017, Verizon was sued by New York City for violating its cable franchise agreement, which required the provider to pass a fiberoptic network to all households in the city by June 30, 2014. Verizon disputed the claims, citing landlords not granting permission to install the equipment on their properties, and an understanding with the government that the fiber network would follow the same routes as its copper lines, and did not necessarily mean it would have to pass the lines in front of every property.

Verizon Connect was created in 2018, combining the individual Telematics, Fleetmatics, and Telogis units.

On December 10, 2018, Verizon announced that 10,400 managers had agreed to leave the company as part of a "voluntary separation program" offered to 44,000 employees, resulting in a cut of around 7% of its workforce. At the same time, the company announced a $4.6 billion write-off on its media division, citing "increased competitive and market pressures throughout 2018 that have resulted in lower-than-expected revenues and earning".

Verizon underwent structural and organizational changes from 2018 to 2019. Hans Vestberg succeeded Lowell McAdam as CEO on August 1, 2018. Vestberg's strategy focused on Verizon's 5G technology. In early 2019, Verizon reorganized itself into three new divisions—Consumer, Business and Media.

Verizon began offering anti-spam and robocalling features free of charge to all customers beginning in March 2019.

Verizon began rolling out its 5G mobile network in April 2019; the network was active in 30 cities by the end of the year. Verizon uses millimeter-wave (mmWave) spectrum as part of its 5G network. While capable of very high speeds, mmWave has limited range and poor building penetration.

On January 14, 2020, Verizon announced the launch of its privacy-focused search engine OneSearch.

Verizon acquired videoconferencing service BlueJeans in May 2020 in order to expand its business portfolio offerings, particularly its unified communications offerings. While the price of the acquisition was not announced, it was believed to be in the sub $500 million range.

In September 2020, Verizon announced its plans to acquire TracFone Wireless (a business unit of Mexican telecom business, América Móvil) for $6.25 billion. The deal was approved by the FCC on November 22, 2021, and closed the following day.

Verizon more than doubled its existing mid-band spectrum holdings in early 2021 by adding an average of 161 MHz of C-Band nationwide, purchased for $52.9 billion at an FCC C-Band auction. The company won between 140 and 200 MHz of C-Band spectrum in every available market.

Verizon sold its media group, including AOL and Yahoo, to Apollo Global Management for $5 billion in 2021, with Verizon retaining a 10% stake in the division.

=== Post-Aol and Yahoo era (2022-present) ===
In 2022, Verizon and AT&T delayed 5G network deployment because the service could interfere with airplane cockpit security systems. In early January 2022, the companies announced 5G deployment but agreed to a two-week delay. In mid-January, Verizon said the high-speed wireless service would still launch, but with a temporary restriction around airports. In late January 2022, the Federal Aviation Administration agreed with AT&T and Verizon on a list of measures that would make it possible to activate 5G on more towers. As a result, carriers have been able to pinpoint areas around airports where the 5G signal should be attenuated, and the FAA reported that about 90% of US commercial aircraft are equipped with approved radio altimeters, allowing them to land in areas of poor visibility with a deployed 5G network. The agency also said work is continuing to ensure that all aircraft can operate within range of the service.

In December 2023, Verizon announced plans to open a new global center of excellence in Limerick, Ireland, in early 2024, aiming to create over 400 jobs in the next two years. This expansion, which adds to its existing workforce of 1,000 employees in Dublin, will offer various positions in technology and communications, including financial operations and network engineering.

In May 2024, Verizon announced a partnership to access direct-to-cell capabilities with satellite manufacturer AST SpaceMobile, which will improve cellular and broadband access in remote areas of the United States.

On September 5, 2024, Verizon announced its intent to acquire Frontier in an all-stock deal for $38.50 per-share, valuing the company at $20 billion. Vestberg stated that the proposed acquisition was a "strategic fit" to expand its fiber network. On May 16, 2025, the Federal Communications Commission approved the acquisition. In January 2026, the California Public Utilities Commission approved the proposed acquisition of Frontier, subject to a series of regulatory conditions relating to affordability, service quality, infrastructure investment, and workforce and supplier diversity. The approval (following the FCC's approval in May 2025) cleared a major remaining regulatory hurdle for the acquisition. The acquisition was completed on January 20, 2026.

In May 2025, Verizon announced that they would end diversity, equity and inclusion programs after the Trump administration opened a probe into them.

On October 6, 2025, the company announced the appointment of Dan Schulman as its new chief executive.

In 2026, Verizon acquired Frontier Communications for $20 billion.

Effective August 16, 2026, Verizon announced it is laying off approximately 3,000 employees and selling 274 corporate-owned stores to independent franchises as part of a restructuring plan to cut $5 billion in operating expenses, amid ongoing customer losses and a strategy to replace routine roles with AI.

== Finances ==
For the fiscal year 2024, Verizon reported earnings of US$17.95 billion, with an annual revenue of US$134.788 billion, an increase of 0.6% over the previous fiscal cycle. Verizon's shares traded at over $45 per share, and its market capitalization was valued at over US$163.96 billion in January 2025. Verizon is currently ranked #31 in the Fortune 500 for 2023 and #68 in the Fortune Global 500.

Year	Revenue in million US$	Net income in million US$	Total Assets in million US$	Price per Share in US$	Employees
2005	69,518	7,397	168,130	33.85	
2006	88,182	6,197	188,804	34.05	
2007	93,469	5,521	186,959	41.22	
2008	97,354	−2,193	202,352	34.90	
2009	107,808	4,894	226,907	30.46	
2010	106,565	2,549	220,005	30.41	
2011	110,875	2,404	230,461	36.64	
2012	115,846	875	225,222	42.00	
2013	120,550	11,497	274,098	48.66	176,800
2014	127,079	9,625	232,616	48.61	177,300
2015	131,620	17,879	244,175	47.17	177,700
2016	125,980	13,127	244,180	51.40	160,900
2017	126,034	30,101	257,143	48.24	155,400
2018	130,863	15,528	264,829	52.08	144,500
2019	131,868	19,265	291,727	58.06	135,000
2020	128,292	18,348	316,481	58.75	132,200
2021	133,613	22,618	366,596	52.25	118,400
2022	136,835	21,748	379,680	39.40	117,100
2023	133,974	12,095	380,255	40.15	105,400
2024	134,788	17,949	374,711	38.90	99,600

== States ==
The company offers Internet, traditional landline phone or VoIP, home security, pay television, web hosting and wholesale data in nine states across the eastern United States.

Key markets include

- Delaware
- Maryland
  - Baltimore
  - Salisbury
- Massachusetts
  - Boston
- New Jersey
- New York
  - Albany
  - Auburn
  - Binghamton
  - Buffalo
  - Glens Falls
  - Saratoga Springs
  - Long Island
  - New York City
  - Plattsburgh
  - Syracuse
- Pennsylvania
  - Harrisburg
  - Philadelphia
  - Pittsburgh
- Rhode Island
  - Providence
- Virginia
  - Norfolk
  - Richmond
- Washington, DC

== Marketing campaigns ==
Since its inception, Verizon Communications has run several marketing campaigns, including:

=== Can you hear me now? ===
The "Can you hear me now?" campaign, which was created for the newly formed Verizon Wireless, started running in 2001, and featured actor Paul Marcarelli in the role of "Test Man", a character based on a Verizon network tester, who travels the country asking "Can you hear me now?". The campaign, originally conceived by New York agency Bozell, ran from early 2001 to September 2010. Data from the technology tracking firm The Yankee Group showed that, in the early years of the campaign, net customers grew 10% to 32.5 million in 2002 and 15% more to 37.5 million in 2003. In addition, customer turnover dropped to 1.8% in 2001, down from 2.5% in 2000. In 2011, Marcarelli parted ways with Verizon, and in 2016, he became a spokesperson for Sprint.

=== There's a map for that ===
The "There's a map for that" campaign was launched in late 2009, designed as a parody of AT&T's "There's an app for that" campaign. The ads depicted a side-by-side comparison of Verizon and AT&T network coverage maps. In early November 2009, AT&T filed a lawsuit in Atlanta federal court, claiming that the coverage maps being used in the ads were misleading. The suit was dropped later that month in conjunction with Verizon dropping a similar suit against AT&T.

== Corporate governance ==
=== Executives ===
As of 2025:

- Dan Schulman, chief executive
- Sowmyanarayan Sampath, head of Verizon consumer
- Kyle Malady, head of Verizon Business

== Corporate responsibility ==
Verizon grants money to organizations through its philanthropic arm, The Verizon Foundation. The company ran HopeLine, which had provided mobile phones to victims of domestic violence. Verizon's educational initiatives include the Verizon Innovative Learning Schools program that provides children access to STEM education programs.

Between 2019 and 2023, Verizon issued five green bonds for a total of $5 billion. Proceeds from its 2023 issue were earmarked to transition to more environmentally friendly electrical grids.

In 2020, Verizon launched its "Citizen Verizon" plan with an outline of social and environmental goals. Among this plan is a pledge to be completely carbon neutral by 2035. The plan also includes digital-skills training for young people.

== Criticism ==
=== Security concerns ===
According to Google Project Zero researcher Tavis Ormandy, Verizon applies a simplistic certification methodology to give its "Excellence in Information Security Testing" award, e.g. to Comodo Group. It focuses on GUI functions instead of testing security relevant features. Not detected were Chromodo browser disabling of the same-origin policy, a VNC-delivered with a default of weak authentication, not enabling address space layout randomization (ASLR) when scanning, and using access control lists (ACLs) throughout its product.

Verizon was reported to have been affected by a 2024 attack from the Salt Typhoon advanced persistent threat linked to the Chinese government.

=== Net neutrality ===
Verizon and Comcast have been actively lobbying for current changes in the FCC's regulations that require internet service providers to offer all content at one internet speed regardless of the type of content since the early 2000s. In 2014, Verizon unsuccessfully sued the FCC for these powers.

In July 2017, it was reported that Verizon's mobile network had been limiting streaming services such as Netflix and YouTube to a speed of 10 Mbit/s; Verizon stated to Ars Technica that it had been testing a system to "optimize the performance of video applications on our network", and that it would not affect video quality.

=== Deceptive advertising of 5G ===
In May 2020, the Better Business Bureau criticized Verizon for claiming it was "building the most powerful 5G experience for America" and recommended that the company make clear and conspicuous disclosures to consumers about the limited actual availability of its 5G network. Verizon had been cited by the Better Business Bureau in March 2019 for ads that "convey the message that Verizon has achieved the important milestone of deploying the first mobile wireless 5G network" prior to 5G availability, falsely conveying that the technology was currently available.

=== Privacy ===
Verizon has a one-star privacy rating from the Electronic Frontier Foundation.

In April 2024, Verizon was fined nearly $47 million by the FCC for illegally sharing access to customers' real-time location data.

== Sponsorships and venues ==
Verizon is the title sponsor of several large performance and sports venues as well as a sponsor of many major sporting organizations.

=== National Hockey League ===
In January 2007, Verizon secured exclusive marketing and promotional rights with the National Hockey League. The deal was extended for another three years in 2012 and included new provisions for the league to provide exclusive content through Verizon's GameCenter app.

=== Motorsports ===
In 2009 and 2010 Verizon sponsored Justin Allgaier in the NASCAR Nationwide Series, before they chose to opt out of a two-year-old NASCAR team sponsorship with Penske Racing in order to pursue an expanded presence with the IndyCar Series. In March 2014 Verizon became title sponsor of the series through 2018.

Verizon also sponsored a race in the 2021 NASCAR Cup Series season, the Verizon 200 at the Brickyard at Indianapolis Motor Speedway.

=== National Football League ===
In late 2010, Verizon Communications joined with Vodafone Group in a joint partnership to replace Sprint as the official wireless telecommunications partner of the National Football League. The four-year deal was estimated at $720 million. In June 2013, Verizon announced a four-year extension with the NFL in a deal reportedly valued at $1 billion. The new agreement gave Verizon the right to stream every NFL regular-season and playoff game.

=== USA Team Handball ===
In January 2020, Verizon became a founding partner of USA Team Handball through the year 2020, with an option to extend the deal until 2024. They are the jersey sponsor for the men's and women's national handball team and the men's and women's national beach handball teams. They are presenter of the USA Team Handball College Nationals.

In 2020 USA Team Handball CEO Barry Siff that they are planning to create an American professional team handball league sponsored by Verizon. They are planning to have the owners until the end of 2020. They are planning to launch the league in 2023 with 10 teams with each team initially worth $3 million to $5 million and want to cooperate with NBA or NHL owners in one-tenant arena situations. To create multisports clubs like FC Barcelona or Paris Saint-Germain.

=== 2026 FIFA World Cup ===
In September 2024, Verizon announced they would be a sponsor for the 2026 FIFA World Cup in the United States, Canada, and Mexico, where they will provide access to their cellular network for visiting fans at stadiums, fan fests, and the metropolitan areas of the host cities.

=== Branded venues ===
The main home concert hall of the Philadelphia Orchestra at the Kimmel Center for the Performing Arts is named Verizon Hall.

Verizon was the former sponsor for a number of sporting and entertainment arenas, including Simmons Bank Arena (formerly Verizon Arena) in North Little Rock, Arkansas, the Mayo Clinic Health System Event Center (formerly Verizon Center) in Mankato, Minnesota, and the SNHU Arena in Manchester, New Hampshire, which was originally known as the Verizon Wireless Arena until September 2016 when Southern New Hampshire University acquired the naming rights for a period of at least 10 years. Verizon was also the title sponsor of entertainment amphitheaters in locations throughout the United States, including four individually referred to as the "Verizon Wireless Amphitheatre" in Irvine, California, Maryland Heights, Missouri, Selma, Texas, and Alpharetta, Georgia.

Verizon is a former sponsor of the Capital One Arena in Washington, DC.

== See also ==
- Verizon strike of 2016
- List of mobile network operators
- List of United States telephone companies
