= RCN Corporation =

American cable television, telephone, and Internet service provider

- Type: Private
- Industry: Telecommunications
- Founded: 1993; 33 years ago (as Residential Communications Network)
- Defunct: 2022; 4 years ago
- Headquarters: Princeton, New Jersey, U.S.
- Key people: Jim Holanda, CEO
- Services: High Speed Internet; Digital Television; Digital Telephone
- Revenue: $636 million
- Number of employees: 1,315
- Parent: Astound Broadband
- Subsidiaries: Grande Communications; Patriot Media Consulting
- Website: www.rcn.com

RCN Corporation, originally Residential Communications Network, founded in 1993 and based in Princeton, New Jersey, was the first American facilities-based ("overbuild") provider of bundled cable telephony, cable television, and internet service delivered over its own hybrid fiber-coaxial local network as well as dialup and DSL Internet service to consumers in the Boston, Chicago, Los Angeles, New York City, the Lehigh Valley in eastern Pennsylvania, and Washington, D.C. areas.

In the late 1990s RCN bought the Internet service providers Erol's for $83.5 million, and Ultranet for $27 million, making RCN the largest northeast regional ISP at the time.

As of 2006, RCN claimed over 424,000 domestic customers and 130 cable franchises. As of 2013 RCN's network offered coverage to approximately 3.8 million people, making it the 11th largest provider of cable Internet access in the U.S. Its operations, as well as sister companies Grande Communications, and Wave Broadband are handled under affiliate Patriot Media Consulting.

RCN serves in or around the following locations: Allentown, Boston, Chicago (limited coverage), New York City, Philadelphia and Washington, D.C.

== History ==
RCN (Residential Communications Network) was originally created in 1993 by developer David McCourt and Peter Kiewit Sons' Inc. Kiewit also owned MFS, a Competitive Access Provider (CAP). In a series of moves, RCN purchased C-TEC, the parent of Pennsylvania's Commonwealth Telephone, while MFS spun off its small residential telephone operations to RCN. MFS was later purchased by Worldcom. RCN/C-TEC became a competitive local exchange carrier (CLEC) when the Telecom Act of 1996 passed.

RCN then began its growth as a cable TV overbuilder, constructing competitor cable systems in markets that already had cable service. Most of its systems were partnerships with power companies, which provided rights-of-way on poles. RCN featured "triple play" (television, internet, and telephone) service though for some time its voice operations were largely resold incumbent telephone company lines. It purchased existing US East Coast Internet service providers Erol's Internet, UltraNet Communications, Interport, and JavaNet. On the West Coast, it purchased existing ISPs DNAI and Brainstorm. In Chicago, it bought into the market by acquiring overbuilder 21st Century Telecom. In Washington, D.C., they formed a 50/50 joint venture with local power company Pepco named StarPower Communications in 1999; they bought out Pepco's stake in 2004, and rebranded StarPower systems to the RCN name.

In 2004, RCN declared Chapter 11 Bankruptcy and on December 21, 2004, the court canceled all outstanding shares of RCN stock traded under the "RCNC" and "RCNCQ" symbols.

In early February 2009, RCN converted to an all-digital network. With the transition, the company was able to use the entire spectrum for digital and high-definition television broadcasting, reducing the need to compress signals.

ABRY Partners, a private equity firm, acquired RCN Corporation for $1.2 billion in 2010.

== Acquisitions and selloffs ==
In 1996, RCN bought much of C-TEC Corporation. On January 21, 1998, RCN paid $110.5M for UltraNet in Massachusetts and Erol's in Virginia. On June 16, 1998, RCN paid $11 million in stock and $871,000 in cash for Interport Communications, Inc. On July 27, 1998, RCN paid $13.4 million in stock and $2.4 million in cash for Javanet, Inc.

In 1999 RCN won in a lawsuit of Cablevision v. Boston Edison. New York City-based Cablevision and the City of Boston had argued that RCN was unfairly working with the electric company's right-of-ways directly to bypass rules that governed other traditional cable companies who wish to attach to the utility poles or enter conduit.

In 2004, its New Jersey systems were spun off to a new company, Patriot Media, which was subsequently sold to Comcast in 2007. The owners of Patriot Media were later tapped to oversee RCN and Grande under ABRY Partners as Patriot Media Consulting.

On March 20, 2006, RCN bought Consolidated Edison Communications Holding Co., a subsidiary of Consolidated Edison, for $32 million and $7 million in working capital.

On August 18, 2006, RCN announced it was selling its San Francisco operations, representing 18,000 subscribers, to Astound Broadband for $45 million.

On September 13, 2006, Bloomberg News, citing two anonymous sources, reported that RCN hired the Blackstone Group to examine the possibility of putting the company up for sale.

On August 15, 2016, the Chicago Tribune reported that TPG, a Texas-based private equity firm, has agreed to buy RCN Telecom Services for $1.6 billion, giving it control of one of Chicago's largest cable providers, the company announced Monday. In a separate transaction, TPG is buying Grande Communications Networks for $650 million, combining the two regional companies into a "top 10" cable player whose most valuable asset is likely its broadband network.

== Merger ==
On May 22, 2017, RCN Corporation, Wave Broadband, and Grande Communications announced the combination of the three companies to create the sixth largest cable operator across seven of the 10 top US cities. The transaction closed in January 2018.

On February 24, 2020, RCN Corporation announced its planned merger of EnTouch Systems, a provider of high-speed internet, video, voice and home security services to the Houston area. The transaction was expected to close by year end 2020. Upon closing, the transaction will add approximately 22,000 customers in Texas.

On November 2, 2020, the US cable operator group of RCN, Grande, Wave and enTouch, collectively known as Astound Broadband, was sold by TPG Capital and Patriot Media Management to Stonepeak Infrastructure Partners for $8.1 billion, including debt.

In 2022, all the companies in the group began rebranding their services to the consumer as "Astound", temporarily keeping a tagline, for example: "Astound Broadband, powered by RCN".

== Internet availability by state ==
State	Areas	Population Covered by RCN
District of Columbia		379,430
Illinois		615,842
Maryland		172,696
Massachusetts	Arlington; Boston (Allston, Brighton, Charlestown, Hyde Park, Jamaica Plain, Mattapan, Roslindale, West Roxbury); Brookline; Burlington; Chestnut Hill; Dedham; Everett; Framingham; Lexington; Milton; Natick; Needham (Needham Heights); Newton (Auburndale, Newton Center, Newton Highlands, Newtonville, Newton Lower Falls, Waban, West Newton); Revere; Somerville; Stoneham; Wakefield; Waltham; Watertown; Woburn	864,398
New York		1,019,475
Pennsylvania		763,355
Texas		22,000 (upon completion of merger expected by YE 2020)
Virginia		16,951

== See also ==
- Sidera Networks
