= Companies listed on the New York Stock Exchange (T) =

== T ==
Stock name	Symbol	Country of origin
The Taiwan Fund, Inc.	TWN	Hong Kong
Taiwan Semiconductor Manufacturing Company Ltd.	TSM	Taiwan
Takeda Pharmaceutical Company Limited	TAK	Japan
TAL Education Group	TAL	China
Talos Energy Inc.	TALO	US
Tanger Factory Outlet Centers, Inc.	SKT	US
Tapestry, Inc.	TPR	US
Targa Resources Corp.	TRGP	US
Target Corporation	TGT	US
Taro Pharmaceutical Industries Ltd.	TARO	Israel
Taylor Morrison Home Corporation	TMHC	US
TC Energy Corporation	TRP	Canada
TCW Strategic Income Fund, Inc.	TSI	US
TD SYNNEX Corporation	SNX	US
TDCX Inc.	TDCX	Singapore
TE Connectivity Ltd.	TEL	Switzerland
Team Inc.	TISI	US
TechnipFMC plc	FTI	United Kingdom
Teck Resources Limited	TECK	Canada
Tecnoglass Inc.	TGLS	Colombia
Teekay Corporation	TK	Bermuda
Teekay Tankers Ltd.	TNK	Bermuda
Tegna Inc.	TGNA	US
Tejon Ranch Co.	TRC	US
Tekla Healthcare Investors	HQH	US
Tekla Healthcare Opportunities Fund	THQ	US
Tekla Life Sciences Investors	HQL	US
Tekla World Healthcare Fund	THW	US
Teladoc Health, Inc.	TDOC	US
Telecom Argentina S.A.	TEO	Argentina
Teledyne Technologies Incorporated	TDY	US
Teleflex Inc.	TFX	US
Telefónica S.A.	TEF	Spain
Telefônica Brasil S.A.	VIV	Brazil
Telephone and Data Systems, Inc.	TDS	US
Telephone and Data Systems, Inc.	TDS.PRU	US
Telephone and Data Systems, Inc.	TDS.PRV	US
Telekomunikasi Indonesia (Persero) Tbk	TLK	Indonesia
Telus Corporation	TU	Canada
Telus International (CDA) Inc.	TIXT	Canada
Templeton Dragon Fund, Inc. (Delaware)	TDF	Singapore
Templeton Emerging Markets Fund, Inc.	EMF	Singapore
Templeton Emerging Markets Income Fund, Inc.	TEI	US
Templeton Global Income Fund, Inc.	GIM	US
Tempur Sealy International, Inc.	TPX	US
Tenaris S.A.	TS	Luxembourg
Tencent Music Entertainment Group	TME	China
Tenet Healthcare Corporation	THC	US
Tennant Company	TNC	US
Tennessee Valley Authority	TVC	US
Tennessee Valley Authority	TVE	US
Teradata Corporation	TDC	US
Terex Corporation	TEX	US
Ternium S.A.	TX	Luxembourg
Terra Income Fund	TFSA	US
Terra Property Trust, Inc.	TPTA	US
Terran Orbital Corporation	LLAP	US
Terran Orbital Corporation	LLAP.WS	US
Terreno Realty Corporation	TRNO	US
Tetra Technologies Inc.	TTI	US
Teva Pharmaceutical Industries Ltd.	TEVA	Israel
Texas Pacific Land Corporation	TPL	US
Textainer Group Holdings Limited	TGH	Bermuda
Textainer Group Holdings Limited	TGH.PRA	Bermuda
Textainer Group Holdings Limited	TGH.PRB	Bermuda
Textron Inc	TXT	US
TFI International Inc.	TFII	Canada
Thermo Fisher Scientific Inc.	TMO	US
Thermon Group Holdings, Inc.	THR	US
Thomson Reuters Corporation	TRI	Canada
Thor Industries, Inc.	THO	US
Thor Low Volatility ETF	THLV	US
Tidewater Inc.	TDW	US
Tillys, Inc.	TLYS	US
TIM S.A.	TIMB	Brazil
The Timken Company	TKR	US
TimkenSteel Corporation	TMST	US
Titan International, Inc.	TWI	US
TJX Companies Inc.	TJX	US
TLG Acquisition One Corp.	TLGA	US
TLG Acquisition One Corp.	TLGA.U	US
Toast, Inc.	TOST	US
Toll Brothers Inc.	TOL	US
Tootsie Roll Industries Inc.	TR	US
TopBuild Corp.	BLD	US
Topgolf Callaway Brands Corp.	MODG	US
The Toro Company	TTC	US
Toronto-Dominion Bank	TD	Canada
Torrid Holdings Inc.	CURV	US
Tortoise Energy Independence Fund, Inc.	NDP	US
Tortoise Energy Infrastructure Corporation	TYG	US
Tortoise Midstream Energy Fund, Inc.	NTG	US
Tortoise Pipeline & Energy Fund, Inc.	TTP	US
Tortoise Power and Energy Infrastructure Fund, Inc.	TPZ	US
TortoiseEcofin Acquisition Corp. III	TRTL	US
TortoiseEcofin Acquisition Corp. III	TRTL.U	US
TortoiseEcofin Acquisition Corp. III	TRTL.WS	US
TotalEnergies SE	TTE	France
Townsquare Media, Inc.	TSQ	US
Toyota Motor Corporation	TM	Japan
TPG RE Finance Trust, Inc.	TRTX	US
TPG RE Finance Trust, Inc.	TRTX.PRC	US
Traeger, Inc.	COOK	US
Trane Technologies plc	TT	Ireland
TransAlta Corporation	TAC	Canada
Transcontinental Realty Investors Inc.	TCI	US
TransDigm Group Incorporated	TDG	US
Transocean Ltd.	RIG	Switzerland
Transportadora de Gas del Sur S.A.	TGS	Argentina
TransUnion	TRU	US
Travel + Leisure Co.	TNL	US
The Travelers Companies, Inc.	TRV	US
Tredegar Corporation	TG	US
TreeHouse Foods, Inc.	THS	US
Trex Company, Inc.	TREX	US
Tri-Continental Corporation	TY	US
Tri-Continental Corporation	TY.PR	US
Tri Pointe Homes, Inc.	TPH	US
Tricon Residential Inc.	TCN	Canada
TriNet Group, Inc.	TNET	US
Trinity Industries Inc.	TRN	US
Trinseo PLC	TSE	US
Triple Flag Precious Metals Corp.	TFPM	Canada
TriplePoint Venture Growth BDC Corp.	TPVG	US
Tristar Acquisition I Corp.	TRIS	US
Tristar Acquisition I Corp.	TRIS.U	US
Tristar Acquisition I Corp.	TRIS.WS	US
Triton International Limited	TRTN	Bermuda
Triton International Limited	TRTN.PRA	Bermuda
Triton International Limited	TRTN.PRB	Bermuda
Triton International Limited	TRTN.PRC	Bermuda
Triton International Limited	TRTN.PRD	Bermuda
Triton International Limited	TRTN.PRE	Bermuda
Triumph Group Inc.	TGI	US
Tronox Holdings plc	TROX	US
TrueBlue, Inc.	TBI	US
Truist Financial Corporation	TFC	US
Truist Financial Corporation	TFC.PRO	US
Truist Financial Corporation	TFC.PRR	US
Truist Financial Corporation	TFC.PRI	US
Tsakos Energy Navigation Limited	TNP	Greece
Tsakos Energy Navigation Limited	TNP.PRE	Greece
Tsakos Energy Navigation Limited	TNP.PRF	Greece
Tupperware Brands Corporation	TUP	US
Turkcell Iletisim Hizmetleri A.S.	TKC	Turkey
Turning Point Brands, Inc.	TPB	US
Tutor Perini Corporation	TPC	US
Tuya Inc.	TUYA	China
Twilio Inc.	TWLO	US
Twin Ridge Capital Acquisition Corp.	TRCA	US
Twin Ridge Capital Acquisition Corp.	TRCA.U	US
Twin Ridge Capital Acquisition Corp.	TRCA.WS	US
Two Harbors Investment Corp.	TWO	US
Two Harbors Investment Corp.	TWO.PRA	US
Two Harbors Investment Corp.	TWO.PRB	US
Two Harbors Investment Corp.	TWO.PRC	US
two	TWOA	US
TXO Partners L.P.	TXO	US
Tyler Technologies, Inc.	TYL	US
Tyson Foods Inc.	TSN	US
