= TXTR =

TXTR or Txtr may refer to:

- Motorola TXTR, portable-phone keyboard
- txtR, a transcriptional regulator protein in Streptomyces scabies
- TXTR, the NYSE stock symbol for Textura Corporation
