= Wave Broadband =

American telecommunications provider

WaveDivision Holdings, LLC
- Trade name: Wave Broadband
- Company type: Subsidiary
- Industry: Telecommunications
- Founded: 2003
- Founder: Steve Weed
- Headquarters: Bothell, Washington, U.S.
- Area served: Washington, Oregon, and California
- Key people: James Holanda, CEO
- Services: Residential, business, and enterprise class fiber-optic, Internet access, VoIP, and cable television
- Revenue: 133,000,000 United States dollar
- Parent: Astound Broadband
- ASN: 11404
- Website: wavebroadband.com

WaveDivision Holdings, LLC, doing business as Wave Broadband, is an American provider of residential, business, and enterprise class cable TV, broadband Internet, and telephone services to around 455,000 customers in Washington, Oregon, and California. Wave provides services via their own fiber-optic network and has approximately 1,300+ employees.

The company was founded by its former CEO, Steve Weed, in 2003, by purchasing cable systems owned by Northland Communications, Cedar Communications, and Charter Communications in Washington and Oregon. It was expanded by acquiring other, some distressed, cable, telecommunications, and broadband companies.

On May 22, 2017, it was announced that Wave was to be acquired by TPG Capital for $2.36 billion. Wave Broadband was combined with RCN Grande, two other cable/internet companies controlled by TPG Capital. RCN provides services along the East Coast and in Chicago similar to those of Wave; Grande operates throughout Texas. Wave is expected to continue to operate under its own brand after the merger is complete. The acquisition of Wave by TPG was completed on January 24, 2018. In November 2020, Stonepeak Infrastructure Partners announced that it would acquire Astound Broadband, which operates Wave, from TPG for $3.6 billion in a leveraged buyout that included an additional $4.5 billion of debt.
