= Astound Broadband =

American telecommunications holding company based in Princeton, New Jersey

- Current logo used since 2022.
- Type: Subsidiary
- Industry: Telecommunications
- Founded: January 24, 2018
- Headquarters: Princeton, New Jersey, United States
- Services: Broadband Internet access; Voice over IP; Cable television
- Parent: Stonepeak Infrastructure Partners
- Divisions: Digital West; enTouch Systems; Grande Communications; RCN Corporation; Wave Broadband
- Website: astound.com

Astound Broadband is an American telecommunications holding company based in Princeton, New Jersey. It was formed on January 24, 2018, with the completion of the $2.36 billion purchase of Kirkland-based Wave Broadband by private-equity firm TPG Capital. TPG combined Wave with its existing combination of Princeton-based RCN Corporation and San Marcos-based Grande Communications, both of which were acquired on February 1, 2017, in a $2.25 billion deal; TPG bought RCN for $1.6 billion and Grande for $650 million.

Initially, WTPG treated the Internet providers as a single, unnamed group, with each provider operating independently, with shared resources. TPG then expanded the unit with its purchase of Houston-based enTouch Systems on September 18, 2020, for an undisclosed sum. Less than two months later, Stonepeak Infrastructure Partners announced on November 1 that it would purchase the unit, by then named Astound after a previous name used by Wave in San Francisco, from TPG for $3.6 billion along with $4.5 billion in debt through a leveraged buyout; TPG had explored selling Astound due to the increased demand for Internet bandwidth during the COVID-19 pandemic. Astound's expansion continued with its purchase of San Luis Obispo-based Digital West on January 26, 2021, also for an undisclosed sum.

On March 12, 2026, the company announced it would be merging with Google Fiber. The combined company will be majority-owned by investment company Stonepeak. The transaction is expected to close by the end of 2026.

== History as an Internet service provider ==
Former logo used in areas served by Wave Broadband (2018–2022)

Astound Broadband was a provider of cable TV, broadband internet, and telephone services on the West Coast, and served over 325,000 residential and business customers within communities in the San Francisco Bay Area. Astound provided services via their fiber-optic network, including high speed internet, digital cable, home phone service, international programming, DVR, HDTV, and TV On Demand. Astound Broadband was part of WaveDivision Holdings, LLC, which is headquartered in Kirkland, Washington. On May 1, 2015, Astound Broadband in San Francisco adopted the parent company's name and was rebranded Wave, which offers the same services to the same geographical areas.
