= Erol's =

Three American companies

Erol's can refer to any of three companies, all founded by Erol Onaran, a Turkish immigrant to Virginia, United States.

== Erol's Inc. ==
Erol's Inc. was a video rental and electronic sales and repair company founded in 1963, which included video rental in 1980. By 1985, Erol's was the country's largest privately owned videocassette rental company. It was sold to Blockbuster Video for $40 million (~$87 million in 2025) in 1990. At the time of the sale, Erol's was the nation's third largest video rental chain with 208 stores in five states and the District of Columbia. Its success was widespread enough to spawn imitations. In Chile, Juan Pablo Correa created in the late 1980s a copycat of Erol's, named locally "Errol's" (with two R's), using the same typeface and color schemes of the American one. The same Chilean company opened several video rental stores called Errol's in Argentina and Bolivia during the 1990s.

== Erol's Internet ==
Using the money from the sale of the video company, Erol expanded his TV repair company and began selling and repairing computers. Soon afterward, he created an ISP bearing his name in the mid-1990s, called Erol's Internet. The ISP was based in Northern Virginia, at the longtime Erol's headquarters at 7921 Woodruff Court in Springfield, Va., and was the Washington D.C area's main competitor to AOL and smaller ISPs such as ClarkNet and CAIS. While owned by Erol Onaran, the business was run by his son, Orhan Onaran. Services provided by Erol's Internet were basic dial-up access with e-mail accounts and web space. Initially, Unix shell accounts were also provided. Unlike AOL, Erol's did not provide subscriber content, though limited attempts at this were made in later years. Erol's popularity was due to its locally based customer support, as well as cheaper prices. At one point a five-year contract for dial-up access could be purchased for just over $300, bringing the monthly cost well below $19.95, which was the average price for all other competitors.

While focused mostly on residential customers, a unit called the Business Services Group (BSG) was set up to provide business services, such as custom domain names with web sites and email, RealAudio, dedicated servers, and static IPs or network blocks. BSG was phased out after less than two years, although business services were available for several years longer.

In the late 1990s, Erol's sought to become a publicly traded corporation and began the process toward an IPO. Instead, the Internet portion of the company was sold to RCN. It was rebranded Erols Internet (without an apostrophe). Slowly, over time, the Erols brand was reduced in favor of the Starpower and later RCN brand, although the domain name still resolves to RCN servers.

== Erol's Computer ==
The Onaran family retained a small store in the nearby Ravensworth shopping center under the name Erol's Computer; it sold computer parts and repaired computers and video equipment. It expanded later to include a modest selection of DVD rentals. It was located where one of their old video rental stores used to be, which was taken over by Blockbuster Video, which was then converted back into an Erol's store. Later, the store moved down the street, near its old ISP headquarters, to a converted storage unit at 5232 Port Royal Road, Springfield, Va., where it operated as Erol's TV-VCR & Computer Service. It was closed shortly after Erol Onaran's death in 2005.
