= Grande Communications =

Telecommunications firm based in Texas

Grande Communications Networks, LLC
- Company type: Subsidiary
- Industry: Telecommunications
- Headquarters: Princeton, New Jersey, U.S.
- Key people: Jim Holanda, CEO
- Services: High-speed Internet access Digital television Digital telephone
- Parent: Astound Broadband

Grande Communications Networks, LLC was an American telecommunications company, based in San Marcos, Texas, that used a fiber optic and cable network to offer broadband services. The company was established in 1999 when it was the recipient of the largest round of venture capital funding in Texas. Grande delivered internet access, local and long-distance telephone service and digital cable over its own network to nine different markets in Texas. Grande Communications served as the primary provider of cable services for dormitories on the campuses of Texas State University, University of the Incarnate Word, Baylor University and the University of Texas at Austin. It was controlled by private equity firm TPG Capital through its affiliate Patriot Media Consulting. Grande Communications was available to an estimated 1.1 million people, previously making it the 16th largest provider of cable broadband in the U.S. by coverage area.

== Acquisitions and mergers ==
On May 22, 2017 RCN Corporation, Wave Broadband and Grande Communications announced the combination of the three companies to create the sixth largest cable operator across seven of the ten top US cities.

On February 24, 2020, RCN Corporation announced its planned merger of enTouch Systems, a provider of high-speed internet, video, voice and home security services to the Houston area. The transaction is expected to close by the end of 2020. Upon closing, the transaction will add approximately 22,000 customers.

On November 2, 2020, the US cable operator group of RCN, Grande, Wave and enTouch, collectively known as Astound Broadband, was sold by TPG Capital and Patriot Media Management to Stonepeak Infrastructure Partners for $8.1 billion, including debt.
