= Michael Dorrell =

Australian billionaire businessman

Michael Dorrell (born August 1973) is an Australian billionaire businessman. He is the co-founder of American private equity firm Stonepeak.

== Early life and education ==
Dorrell grew up in Griffith, New South Wales, Australia, a farming town 7 hours drive south-west of Sydney. He earned a bachelor of laws and a bachelor of commerce degree, both from the University of New South Wales in Sydney.

== Career ==
Dorrell worked at Macquarie Group, and at 2001 at age 25 moved from the company's Sydney headquarters to work in the United States. He stated that the company "didn’t take the U.S. all that seriously", and "that's why a 25-year-old kid could be sent over here and be one of six people looking at this whole market".

Dorrell co-founded Stonepeak with Trent Vichie. In April 2025, Forbes estimated Dorrell's net worth at US$8.5 billion.

The Wall Street Journal reported that Dorrell bought Tarpon Island, the only private island in Palm Beach, Florida for $150 million.
