= Seaco =

Shipping container company

Seaco Srl
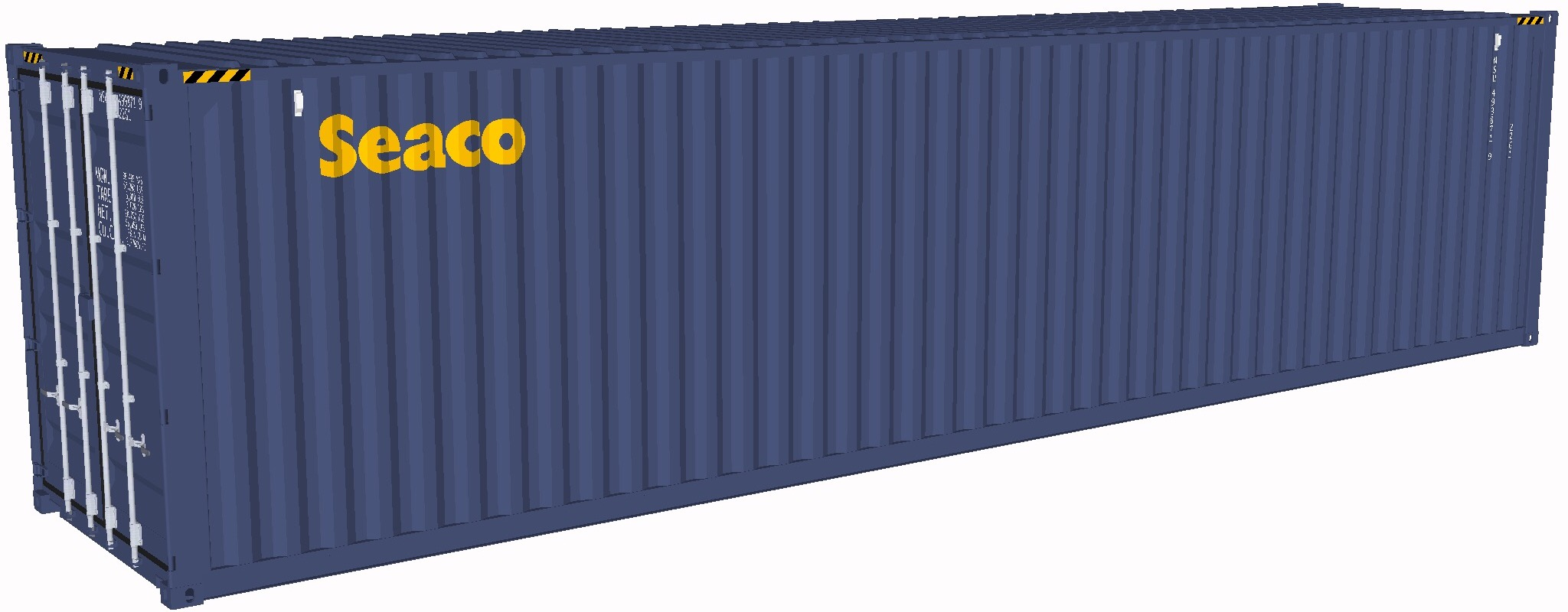
- A Seaco 40ft container.
- Type: Limited liability company
- Industry: Marine container leasing
- Founded: 1998; 28 years ago
- Headquarters: Hamburg, Germany
- Area served: Worldwide
- Key people: Jeremy Matthew (CEO), Rohit Saxena (CFO)
- Owner: Bohai Leasing
- Parent: Global Sea Containers Ltd.
- Website: www.seacoglobal.com

Seaco Srl is a company that sells and leases marine containers. It has operational offices in Hamburg, Houston, Singapore and Sydney and is registered in Bermuda and Barbados.

Seaco is owned by the Bermuda-based Global Sea Containers Ltd., which is itself indirectly owned by Bohai Leasing. HNA Group own the majority of shares in Bohai Leasing, which is listed on the Shenzhen Stock Exchange.

== History ==
The company was formed as GE Seaco in 1998 as a joint venture between General Electric and Sea Containers. Sea Containers filed for Chapter 11 bankruptcy protection in 2006, and its interests including the stake in GE Seaco were transferred to a new company, Seaco Ltd. Seaco Ltd sold GE Seaco, renamed Seaco Srl, to HNA Group in 2011.

== See also ==
- List of largest container shipping companies
- Triton International
- Textainer Group Holdings
