= Triton International =

American container leasing company

Triton International Limited
- Type: Public
- Traded as: NYSE: TRTN
- Founded: 1963; 63 years ago
- Headquarters: Hamilton, Bermuda, Bermuda
- Key people: Brian Sondey (Chairman, President); Michael Pearl (CFO)
- Services: Container Rental & Leasing Services
- Revenue: $1.8B (Dec 31, 2021)
- Owner: Brookfield Infrastructure Partners (2023–present)
- Website: www.tritoninternational.com

Triton International Limited is a leasing company based in Hamilton, Bermuda, specializing in intermodal freight equipment leasing and maritime container management services. The company's fleet included 7.1 million TEU containers, open tops, flat racks, generator sets and chassis.

Triton was founded in 1981 in a partnership between Ed Schneider and Thomas Pritzker. In 2011 the Pritzker family sold Triton to Vester Capital Partners and Warburg Pincus. When TAL International and Triton Container International merged in July 2016, Triton International became the largest container leasing company with a market share of 26%. TAL International's then-CEO Brian Sondey went on to head Triton International.

After John Burns announced his planned retirement in the fall of 2022, Triton announced that Michael Pearl would take over as its CFO. In September 2023, it was acquired by Brookfield Infrastructure Partners with the Triton stock being delisted from the New York Stock Exchange.

== See also ==
- List of largest container shipping companies
- Seaco
- Textainer Group Holdings
