= Textainer Group Holdings =

Holding company based in Bermuda

Textainer Group Holdings Limited
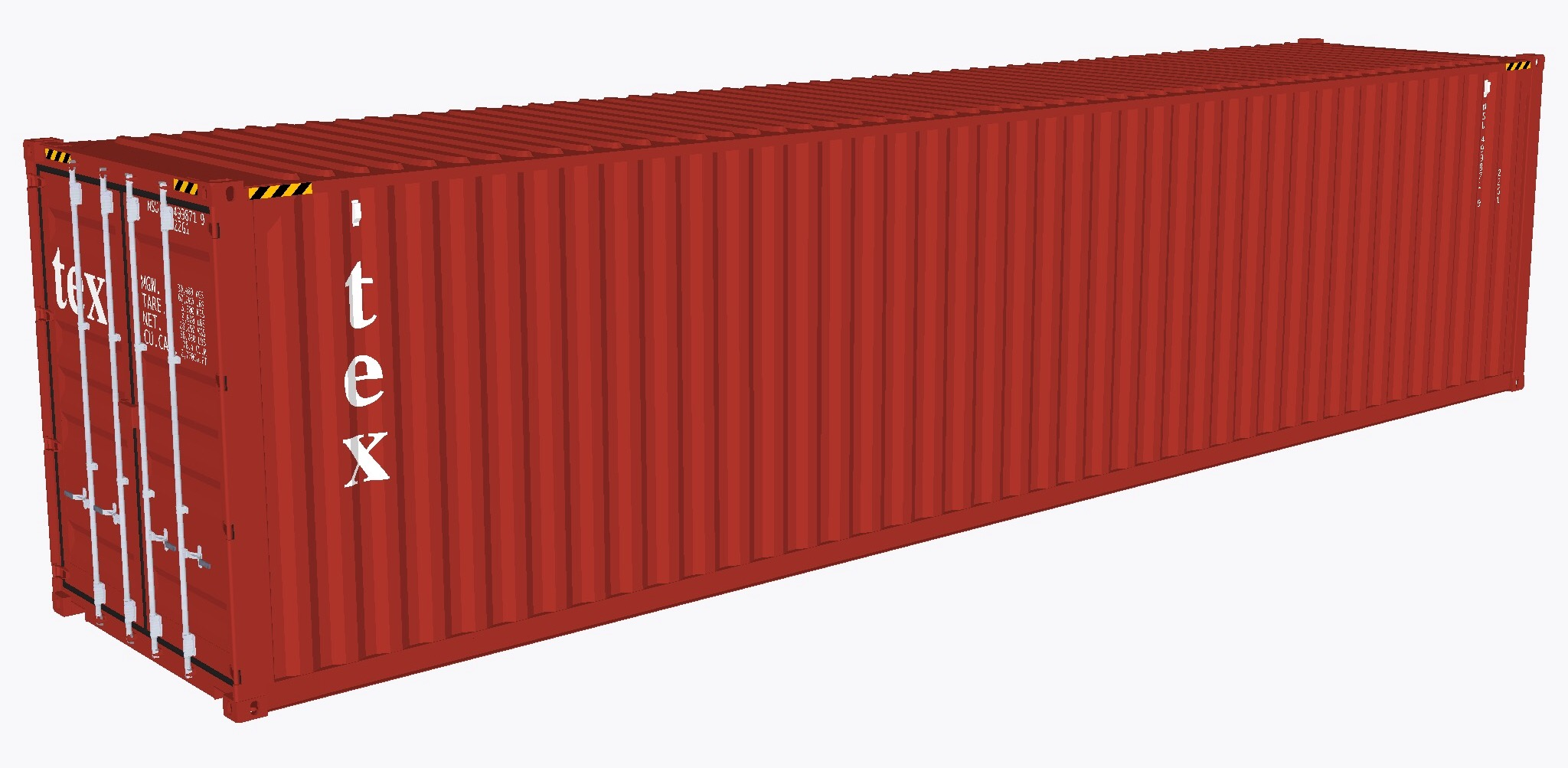
- Traded as: NYSE: TGH (prior to 2024)
- Industry: Rental and leasing services
- Founded: 1979; 47 years ago
- Founder: Ken George, Jim Sullivan
- Headquarters: Hamilton, Bermuda
- Key people: Olivier Ghesquiere (CEO); Michael Chan (CFO)
- Services: leasing of intermodal containers
- Revenue: $ 528.97M (Dec 31, 2013)
- Owner: Stonepeak (2024–present)
- Website: www.textainer.com

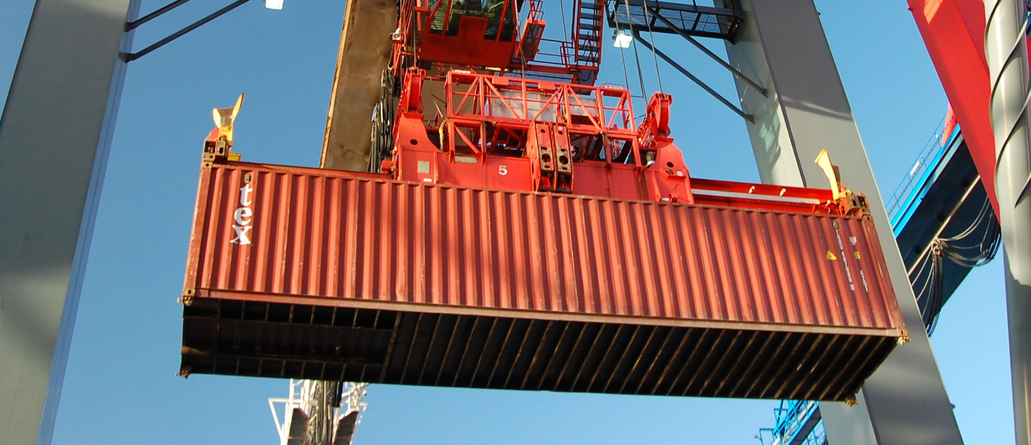
Textainer 40 foot container being loaded

Textainer Group Holdings Limited is a holding company that focuses on purchasing, leasing, and resale of marine cargo containers. There are three business segments: Container Ownership, Container Management, and Container Resale.

Founded in 1979 by Ken George and Jim Sullivan, the firm has its headquarters located in Hamilton, Bermuda. On March 14, 2024, it was announced that Textainer had been acquired by Stonepeak.

== Overview ==
As of January 22, 2014, the company was the lessor of about two million intermodal containers. It leases containers to more than 400 shipping lines and other lessees.

In October 2012, two months before purchasing a 50.1% interest in TAP Funding Ltd., the firm acquired about 81,000 twenty-foot equivalent units (TEUs) of dry freight containers from managed fleet. In January 2013, Textainer Group Holdings Ltd. (TGHL) acquired about 24,000 twenty-foot equivalent units of standard dry freight containers from its managed fleet.

It owns two subsidiaries, Textainer Equipment Management Ltd. (TEML) and Textainer Ltd. (TL). Textainer's second subsidiary has two other subsidiaries: Textainer Marine Containers Ltd. (TMCL) and TW Container Leasing Ltd. (owned by TL and Wells Fargo Container Corp.

== Operations ==
Textainer operates in 14 regional and area offices: Americas Region in Hackensack, New Jersey; European Region in London; North Asia Region in Yokohama; and the South Asia Region in Singapore. It has more than 400 leasing customers and more than 1,100 container sales customers.

In October 2009, Textainer acquired 31,000 containers (53,000 TEU) of Amphibious Container Leasing Ltd, (Amficon), mostly speciality containers. In May 2011, the firm acquired about 171,000 TEU of containers and related lease rights and working capital ($174 million) that it has been managing for Buss Global since 2006.

In December 2012, TGHL acquired a 50.1% interest in TAP Funding Ltd. for about $78 million, with many types of container (dry freight, refrigerated). The following year, the company announced their fleet surpassed 3 million TEU, which represented a major milestone for the company as well as the industry.

In January 2014, Textainer Group Holdings Limited completed the acquisition of about 30,000 TEU of standard dry freight containers from its managed fleet ($35 million), which increased the percentage of Textainer’s owned fleet to 77%.

== Products and services ==
The Container Ownership segment owns and leases dry freight containers (also dry freight specials). The Container Management segment offers acquisition and management services. The Container Resale segment sells containers from its fleet (also purchasing, leasing, or reselling containers). The company also provides leased containers under a contract with the Surface Deployment and Distribution Command for the US military.

== See also ==
- Seaco
- Triton International
- List of largest container shipping companies
