= Stonepeak =

American infrastructure investment firm

Stonepeak Partners LP

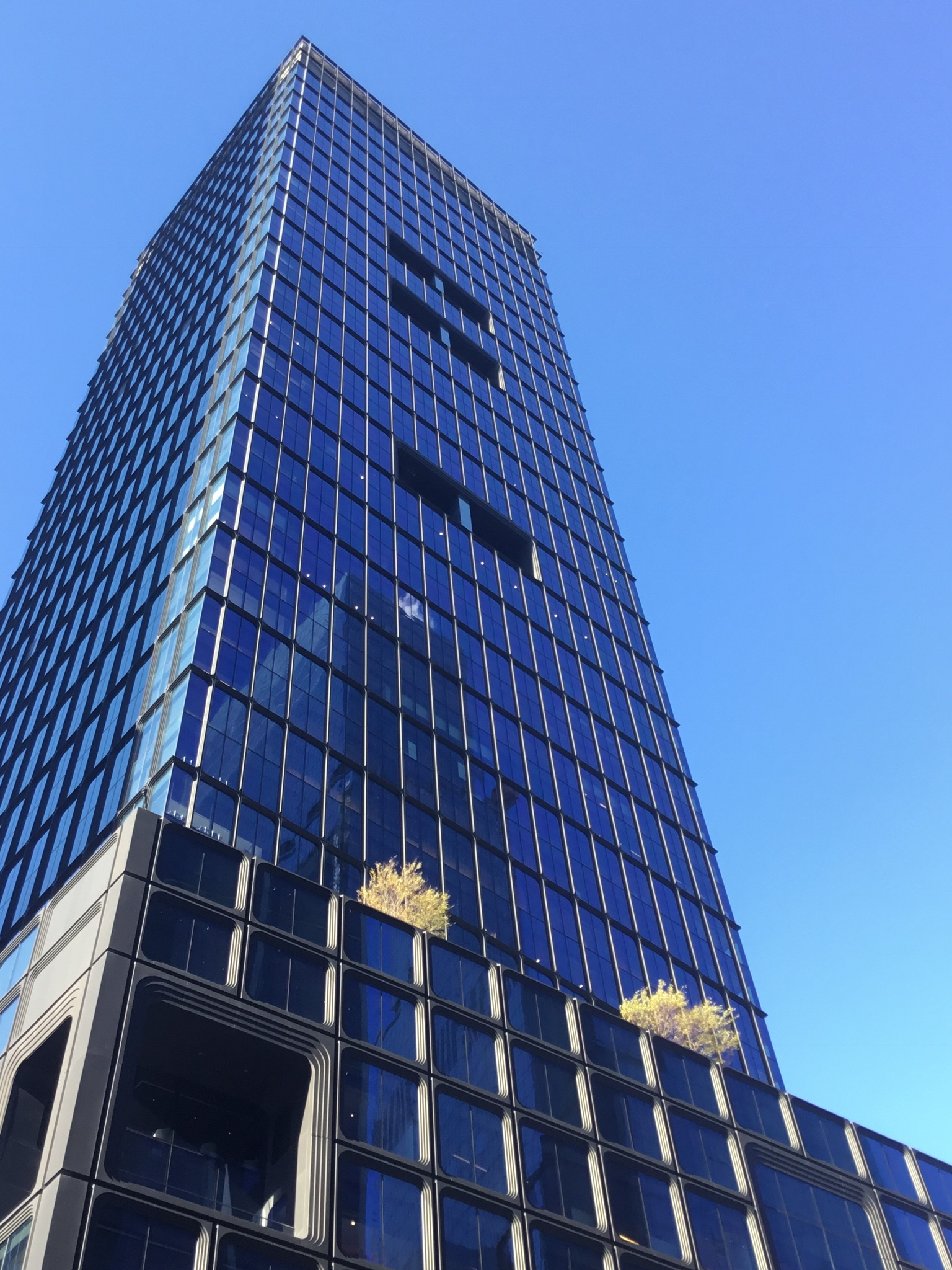
- Headquarters at 55 Hudson Yards
- Trade name: Stonepeak
- Type: Private
- Industry: Investment management
- Founded: 2011; 15 years ago
- Founders: Michael Dorrell; Trent Vichie
- Headquarters: 55 Hudson Yards, New York City, U.S.
- Key people: Michael Dorrell (Chairman and CEO); Jack Howell (Co-President); Luke Taylor (Co-President)
- Products: Private equity Private credit Infrastructure fund Mezzanine capital Real estate
- AUM: US$93 billion (2026)
- Number of employees: 360 (2026)
- Website: stonepeak.com

Stonepeak (also known as Stonepeak Partners and Stonepeak Infrastructure Partners) is an American investment firm headquartered in New York City. The firm focuses on investments in infrastructure and more recently real estate. The firm has additional offices in Hong Kong, Houston, London, Sydney and Singapore.

In 2022, the firm was ranked by Infrastructure Investor (under Private Equity International) as the sixth largest infrastructure investment firm based on total fundraising over the most recent five-year period.

== Background ==
In 2008, Michael Dorrell and Trent Vichie joined Blackstone Inc. from the Macquarie Group to establish its infrastructure investment unit. In 2011, the unit was spun off as an independent firm named Stonepeak which was based in New York.

The firm's debut fund, Stonepeak Infrastructure Fund I raised $1.65 billion with its investors including Washington State, Oregon State, Virginia Retirement System and TIAA.

In September 2018, Stonepeak received a $350 million off balance sheet investment from Landmark Partners.

In March 2021, Vichie left Stonepeak to found his own company, EverWind Fuels.

In November 2021, Bloomberg News reported Stonepeak was in discussions on expanding into real estate investments and setting up its first real estate investment fund. In July 2022, its debut real estate fund, Stonepeak Real Estate Partners was launched. In September 2022, the Texas Municipal Retirement System committed $150 million to the fund.

In July 2023, Blue Owl Capital made a $2 billion 13.5% minority investment in Stonepeak, valuing the firm at approximately $15 billion.

The firm is noted for having numerous ex-Macquarie Group employees in its ranks. Apart from both its co-founders, several of its senior managing directors also previously worked at the Macquarie Group.

In August 2025, Stonepeak launched WahajPeak, a renewable energy platform investing in utility-scale solar, wind, and battery storage projects across the Gulf Cooperation Council and the broader Middle East.

== Acquisitions and investments ==
In March 2017, Stonepeak acquired Cologix.

In November 2020, Stonepeak acquired Astound Broadband from TPG Inc. for $3.6 billion in cash along with $4.5 billion in debt.

In November 2022, Stonepeak and Spirit Super acquired the Port of Geelong in a $732 million deal.

In April 2021, Stonepeak teamed up with EQT AB to acquire KPN but in May, KPN rejected the deal.

In October 2021. Stonepeak acquired Teekay LNG in a $6.2 billion deal.

In May 2022, Stonepeak teamed up with Blackstone Inc.’s Blackstone Real Estate Income Trust and the Cherng Family Trust (Panda Restaurant Group) to acquire the Cosmopolitan of Las Vegas for $5.65 billion.

In March 2024, Stonepeak completed the acquisition of Textainer, a Bermuda-based lessor of intermodal shipping containers, taking the company private. Textainer common shareholders received $50.00 per share in cash, valuing the common equity at approximately $2.1 billion and giving the transaction an enterprise value of about $7.4 billion.

In April 2025, it was announced that Stonepeak and KKR had agreed to buy Assura plc (AGRP), a UK-listed real estate company, in a deal worth £1.6 billion. Primary Health Properties (PHP) submitted a competing bid worth £1.79 billion, which was accepted by AGRP shareholders in August 2025.

In April 2025, Stonepeak acquired Air Transport Services Group (ATSG), an aircraft lessor and air cargo operator, in an all-cash deal valued at approximately $3.1 billion including debt. ATSG leases midsize freighters and flies cargo and passenger charters through subsidiaries including ABX Air, Air Transport International, and Omni Air International, which operates deportation flights under subcontracts with U.S. Immigration and Customs Enforcement.

In May 2025, Stonepeak and Energy Equation Partners announced an agreement to acquire a 65% interest in Phillips 66's Germany and Austria retail marketing business, operator of the JET-branded service station network, in a transaction valuing the business at an enterprise value of approximately €2.5 billion. Phillips 66 retained a 35% non-operated interest through the newly formed joint venture. The transaction closed on December 1, 2025.

In December 2025, it was announced Stonepeak had agreed to acquire a 65 per cent majority controlling stake in Castrol from BP, valuing the lubricants business at an enterprise value of approximately US$10.1 billion. BP will retain a 35 per cent minority interest, while the Canada Pension Plan Investment Board will invest up to US$1.05 billion for an indirect stake in the transaction. The acquisition is subject to regulatory approvals and is expected to complete by the end of 2026.

In January 2026, Stonepeak struck a deal with CMA CGM to create a US-based port venture valued around $10 billion. Stonepeak agreed to make a $2.4 billion investment for a 25% stake in the venture, to be known as United Ports.

On March 11, 2026, Alphabet Inc. and Stonepeak announced an agreement to combine Google Fiber (GFiber) with Stonepeak's Astound Broadband. The combined company will be majority-owned by Stonepeak, with Alphabet retaining a "significant minority" stake, and will be led by GFiber's existing management team. Financial terms were not disclosed; the transaction is expected to close in the fourth quarter of 2026, subject to regulatory approval.

In September 2026, Stonepeak sold Omni Air International. At the time of the sale, Stonepeak was aiming to purchase Chicago Parking Meters. Numerous members of the Chicago City Council vowed to block the sale of Chicago Parking Meters unless Stonepeak divested from Omni Air International, citing its contract with ICE to provide long-haul deportation flights. After the divestment, Stonepeak was approved to purchase Chicago Parking Meters.
