= Colorado State Highway 368 =

State highway in Colorado, US

State Highway 368
- Map of southern Colorado with SH 368 highlighted in red

Route information
- Maintained by CDOT
- Length: 12.329 mi (19.842 km)

Major junctions
- West end: SH 370 west of Waverly
- SH 371 west of Estrella
- East end: US 285 in Estrella

Location
- Country: United States
- State: Colorado
- Counties: Rio Grande, Conejos, Alamosa

Highway system
- Colorado State Highway System; Interstate; US; State; Scenic
← US 350	→ SH 370

State Highway 368 (SH 368) is a 12.329-mile (19.842 km) state highway in Rio Grande, Conejos, and Alamosa counties in Colorado United States, that connects Colorado State Highway 370 (SH 370) west of Waverly with U.S. Route 285 (US 285) in Estrella.

== Route description ==
SH 368 begins at a junction with SH 370 and County Road 4E (CR 4E) in Rio Grande County, about 3.8 miles (6.1 km) west of Waverly and approximately 11 miles (18 km) southeast of Monte Vista. (SH 370 heads east toward US 285 and Alamosa. SH 370 heads west toward Colorado State Highway 15 [SH 15] and Monte Vista. CR 4E heads north toward the Monte Vista National Wildlife Refuge.)

From its western terminus SH 368 heads due south and, after about 2 miles (3.2 km) and crossing County Road 11S, reaches County Road 12S at the Rio Grande–Conejos county line. Continuing due south for about another one mile (1.6 km), SH 368 curves to head due east, with a junction with the north end of County Road 10 in the middle of the curve at a T intersection. After heading due east for about 2 miles (3.2 km), and crossing County Road 11, SH 368 reaches a junction with Conejos County Road 12 (CR 12) and Alamosa County Road 13S (CR 13S) at the Conejos–Alamosa county line. (CR 13S heads briefly east, while CR 12 heads north toward Waverly.)

From its junction with CR 12 and CR 13S, SH 368 heads due south along the Conejos–Alamosa county line (with Alamosa County on the east and Conejos County on the west) for about one mile (1.6 km) to a junction with the north end of Colorado State Highway 371 (SH 371) and Conejos County Road DD (CR DD). (SH 371 heads south toward Capulin and La Jara while CR DD heads west toward SH 15.)

From its junction with SH 371 and CR DD, SH 368 heads due east into Alamosa County for approximately 6.3 miles (10.1 km) to its western terminus with US 285 and Alamosa County Road 14S (CR 14S) in Estrella, connecting with the south end of several county roads along the way. (US 285 heads north toward Alamosa and south toward La Jara and Antonito, while CR 14S heads briefly east.)

== Major intersections ==
County	Location	mi	km	Destinations	Notes
Rio Grande		0.000	0.000	CR 4E north – Monte Vista National Wildlife Refuge	Continuation north from western terminus
Rio Grande		0.000	0.000	SH 370 east – US 285, Alamosa SH 370 west – SH 15, Monte Vista	Western terminus
Conejos–Alamosa county line		6.022	9.691	SH 371 south – Capulin, La Jara; Conejos CR DD west	Northern end of SH 371
Alamosa	Estrella	12.329	19.842	US 285 north – Alamosa US 285 south – La Jara, Antonito	Eastern terminus
Alamosa	Estrella	12.329	19.842	CR 14S east	Continuation east from eastern terminus
1.000 mi = 1.609 km; 1.000 km = 0.621 mi

== See also ==
- List of state highways in Colorado
