= U.S. Route 285 in Colorado =

Section of U.S. Highway in Colorado

U.S. Highway 285
- US 285 highlighted in red

Route information
- Auxiliary route of US 85
- Maintained by CDOT
- Length: 263.87 mi (424.66 km)

Major junctions
- South end: US 285 at the New Mexico state line near Antonito
- US 160 in Monte Vista; US 50 in Poncha Springs; US 24 in Johnson Village; US 85 in Sheridan
- North end: I-25 / US 87 / SH 30 in Denver

Location
- Country: United States
- State: Colorado
- Counties: Conejos, Alamosa, Rio Grande, Saguache, Chaffee, Park, Jefferson, Arapahoe, Denver

Highway system
- United States Numbered Highway System; List; Special; Divided; Colorado State Highway System; Interstate; US; State; Scenic
← I-270	→ US 287

U.S. Route 285 (US 285) is the section north-south highway in Colorado that starts at the New Mexico state line and ends at I-25, US 87, and SH 30 in Denver.

== Route description ==
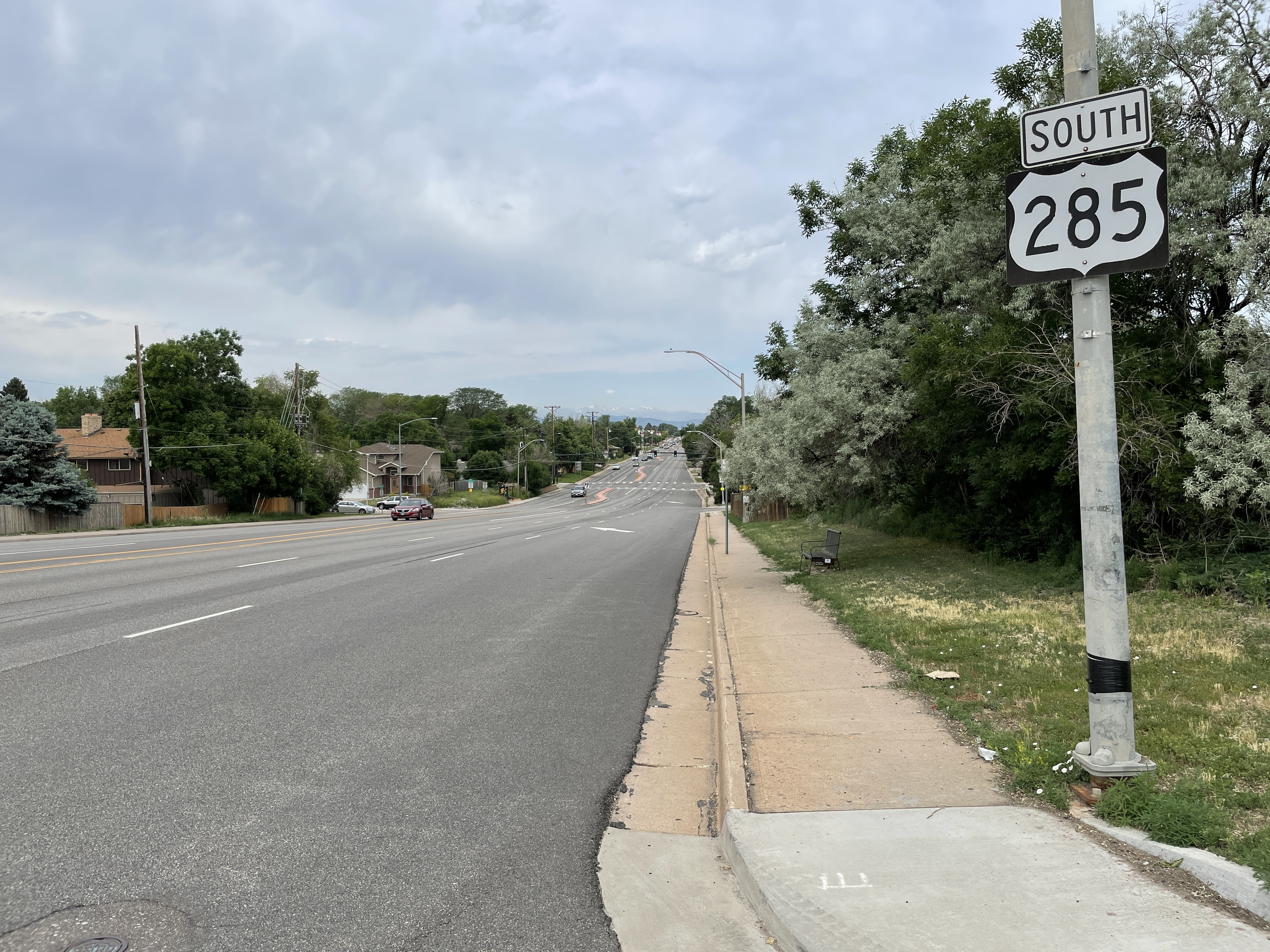
US 285 southbound past its northern terminus at I-25/US 87 and SH 30 in Denver

Heading north from the Colorado border, US 285 passes through the main part of the San Luis Valley, eventually reaching Alamosa. As the highway heads north, it begins to ascend to the northern end of the valley and eventually climbs over Poncha Pass, elevation 9,012 feet (2,747 m), and drops sharply down the other side into the Arkansas River Valley.

The highway brushes Salida and follows the Arkansas River north up the valley, then takes a sharp eastward turn just before the small town of Buena Vista. 285 then climbs over Trout Creek Pass, elevation 9,346 feet (2,849 m), and enters the high-altitude South Park basin.

A few miles north, the highway passes through Fairplay and the historic South Park City site, then reaches its highest elevation: 10,031 feet (3,057 m), at the summit of Red Hill Pass. US 285 then leaves the South Park basin and climbs over Kenosha Pass, elevation 10,001 feet (3,048 m), and skirts the south side of the Mount Evans massif as it descends its way through the foothills range towards Denver.

As the highway leaves the Rocky Mountains and reaches Denver's southwest suburbs, it becomes Hampden Avenue, an important artery in the south Denver metro area, then reaches its northern terminus at I-25. The high speed, dual-carriageway segment of US 285 that aligns with Hampden Avenue in the grid system is locally known as the Hampden Avenue Freeway.

On March 14, 2008 both houses of the Colorado legislature, in a unanimous vote, named the section between Kenosha Pass and C-470 the Ralph Carr Memorial Highway.

== History ==
The short segment between US 50 at Salida and US 24 at Buena Vista closely parallels the original U.S. Route 650, which was designated in 1926, but eliminated in 1936 when US 285 was commissioned along its present extent from Sanderson to Denver, mostly replacing state-numbered highways.

Between Bailey and Como, US 285 mostly follows the route of the Denver, South Park and Pacific Railroad, part of the original narrow gauge transcontinental railroad.

== Gallery ==
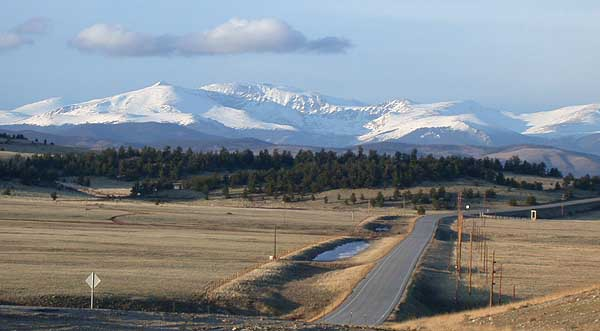
View of South Park along U.S. Highway 285 looking east toward the Front Range

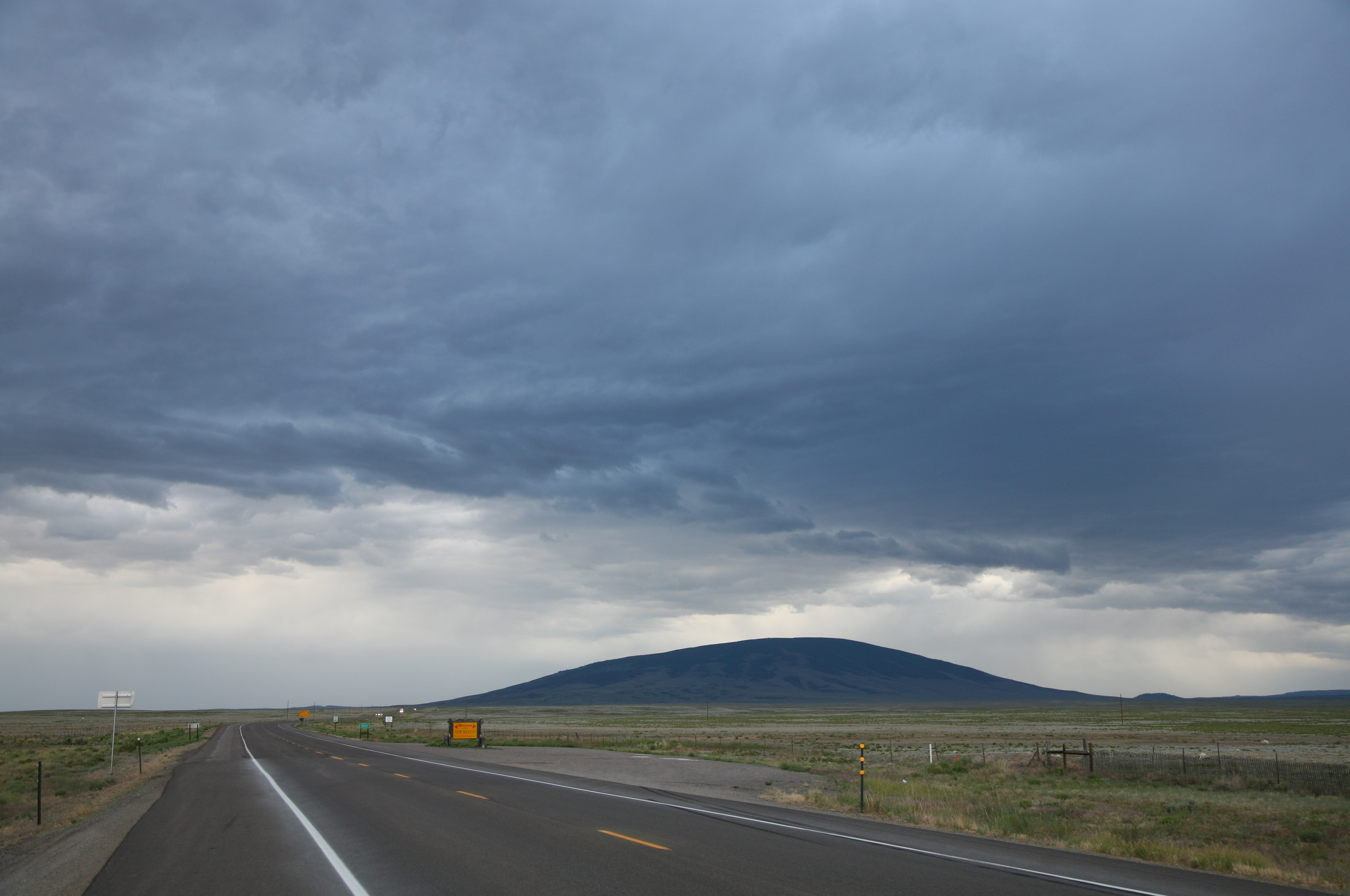
San Antonio Mountain in New Mexico, as seen from the Colorado side of the NM-CO state line on US 285

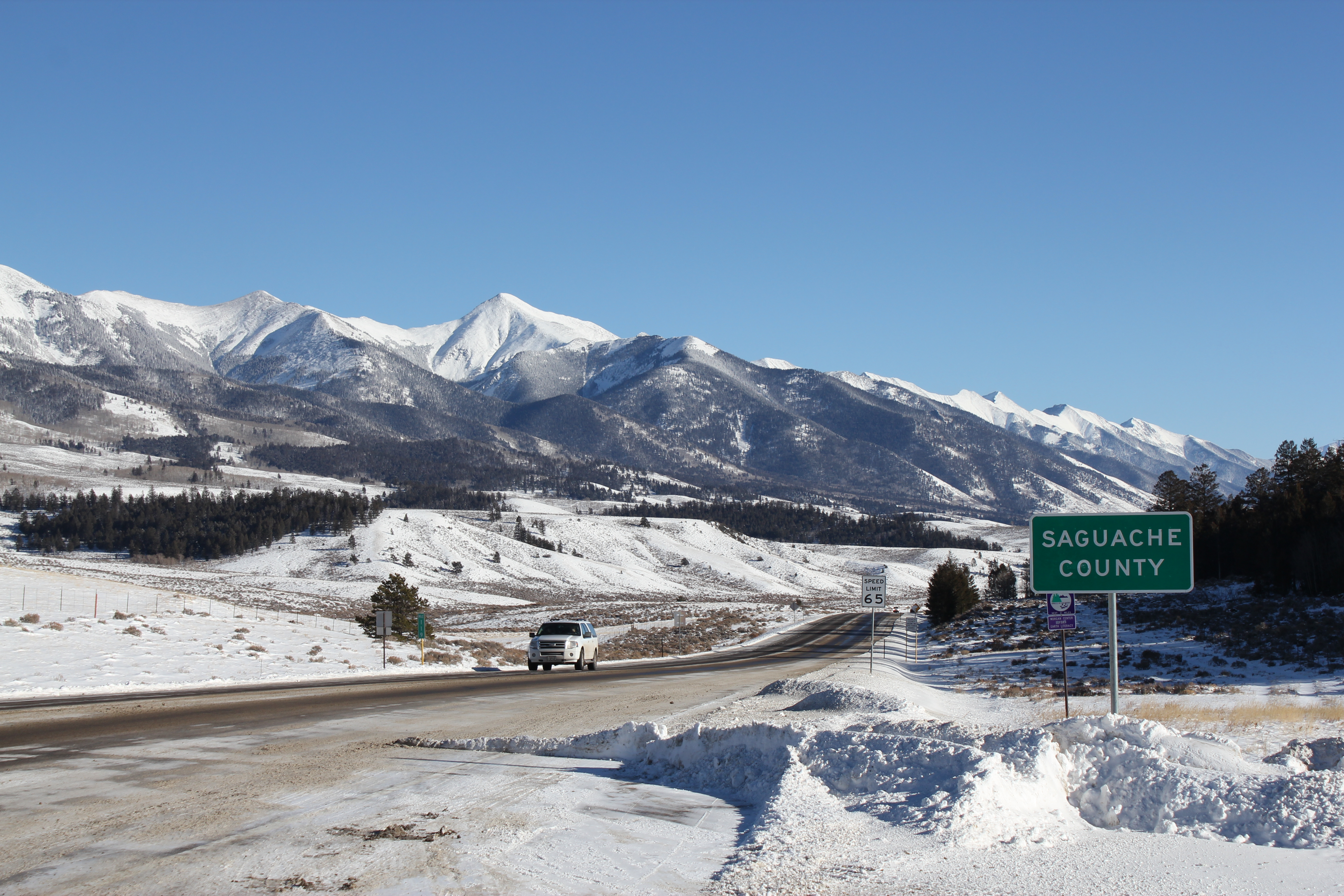
U.S. 285 entering Saguache County from the north

== Junction list ==
All exits are unnumbered.

County	Location	mi	km	Destinations	Notes
Conejos		0.000	0.000	US 285 south – Santa Fe, Tres Piedras	Continuation into New Mexico
Conejos	Antonito	5.200	8.369	SH 17 west – Chama	South end of SH 17 concurrency
Conejos	Romeo	12.707	20.450	SH 142 east – Manassa, San Acacio	
Conejos	La Jara	19.817	31.892	SH 136 east – Sanford	
Conejos	La Jara	20.418	32.860	SH 15 west – Capulin, Monte Vista	
Alamosa	Estrella	26.829	43.177	SH 368 west	
Alamosa		31.257	50.303	SH 370 west – Waverly	
Alamosa	Alamosa	34.102	54.882	US 160 east / SH 17 (Sixth Street east) – Fort Garland	6th St. is a one-way street, outbound access only; north end of SH 17 concurrency; south end of US 160 concurrency
Alamosa	Alamosa	34.175	54.999	US 160 / SH 17 (Main Street)	Main St. is a one-way street, inbound access only; no southbound access to Main St.
Rio Grande	Monte Vista	51.159	82.332	US 160 west (First Avenue west) / SH 15 south (Broadway south) – Del Norte	North end of US 160 concurrency
Rio Grande–Saguache county line		62.904	101.234	SH 112 – Del Norte, Hooper	
Saguache	Saguache	86.290	138.870	SH 114 west – Parlin	
Saguache	Villa Grove	100.518	161.768	SH 17 south – Moffat, Hooper	
Chaffee	Poncha Springs	126.480	203.550	US 50 east – Salida	South end of US 50 concurrency
Chaffee	Poncha Springs	126.853	204.150	US 50 west – Gunnison	North end of US 50 concurrency
Chaffee		133.883	215.464	SH 291 east – Salida	
Chaffee	Johnson Village	148.065	238.288	US 24 west – Buena Vista	South end of US 24 concurrency
Park		161.789	260.374	US 24 east – Hartsel	North end of US 24 concurrency
Park	Fairplay	181.971	292.854	SH 9 south – Garo, Hartsel	South end of SH 9 concurrency
Park	Fairplay	182.989	294.492	SH 9 north – Alma Junction, Blue River	North end of SH 9 concurrency
Park		224.537	361.357	CR 43 north (Deer Creek Road) / CR 72 south – Deer Creek, Id-Ra-Ha-Je	Interchange
Jefferson		231.000	371.758	Elk Creek Road – Shaffers Crossing	Interchange
Jefferson	Conifer	235.316	378.704	Foxton Road / Kennedy Gulch Road	Interchange
Jefferson	Conifer	235.945	379.717	CR 73 / Pleasant Park Road – Evergreen	Right-in/right-out interchange; CR 73 is former SH 73
Jefferson	Conifer			Main Street	Interchange; northbound exit only
Jefferson	Aspen Park	236.659	380.866	Light Lane Conifer Town Center Parkway	Northbound signage; right-in/right-out interchange Southbound signage; interchange
Jefferson	Aspen Park	237.062	381.514	Main Street / Conifer Road Barkley Road	Northbound signage; right-in/right-out interchange Southbound signage; right-in/right-out interchange
Jefferson	Aspen Park	237.794	382.692	Meyer Parkway / Conifer Road – Aspen Park	Right-in/right-out interchange
Jefferson		238.877	384.435	South Turkey Creek Road	Interchange
Jefferson		244.121	392.875	North Turkey Creek Road – Tinytown	Interchange
Jefferson	Indian Hills	246.167	396.167	Parmalee Gulch Road	Partial interchange
Jefferson		248.443	399.830	SH 8 east to SH 74 – Morrison, Evergreen	South end of freeway, western terminus of SH-8
Jefferson		250.082	402.468	SH 470 to I-25 / I-70	Cloverleaf interchange; split into separate east (to I-25) and west (to I-70) exits; SH 470 exits 5A-B
Jefferson	Lakewood	252.052	405.638	Simms Street	
Jefferson	Lakewood	253.512	407.988	SH 391 north (Kipling Street)	Southern terminus of SH 391
Jefferson	Lakewood	255.034	410.437	SH 121 (Wadsworth Boulevard)	
City and County of Denver		256.547	412.872	SH 95 north (Sheridan Boulevard)	North end of freeway, southern terminus of SH-95
Arapahoe	Sheridan	258.063	415.312	SH 88 (Federal Boulevard)	Interchange
Arapahoe	Sheridan	258.41	415.87	Bryant Street	Right-in/right-out interchange; northbound entrance and exit only
Arapahoe	Sheridan	259.326	417.345	US 85 (Santa Fe Drive)	Interchange; split into separate north and south exits southbound
Arapahoe	Englewood	260.167	418.698	Broadway	Interchange; former SH 75
Arapahoe	Englewood	261.716	421.191	SH 177 south (University Boulevard)	Northern Terminus of SH 177
Arapahoe–Denver county line	Englewood–Denver line	262.688	422.755	SH 2 north (Colorado Boulevard)	Southern Terminus of SH-2
City and County of Denver		263.874	424.664	I-25 (US 87) / SH 30 (Hampden Avenue east)	Northern terminus of US 285; I-25 exit 201; highway continues east as SH 30 (Hampden Ave.)
1.000 mi = 1.609 km; 1.000 km = 0.621 mi: Concurrency terminus; Incomplete access; Route transition

U.S. Route 285
Previous state: New Mexico	Colorado	Next state: Terminus
