= Colorado State Highway 371 =

State highway in Colorado, United States

State Highway 371
- SH 371 highlighted in red

Route information
- Maintained by CDOT
- Length: 6.067 mi (9.764 km)

Major junctions
- South end: SH 15 east of Capulin
- North end: SH 368 west of Estrella

Location
- Country: United States
- State: Colorado
- Counties: Conejos, Alamosa

Highway system
- Colorado State Highway System; Interstate; US; State; Scenic
← SH 370	→ US 385

State Highway 371 (SH 371) is a 6.067-mile (9.764 km) state highway in Conejos and Alamosa counties in Colorado, United States, that connects Colorado State Highway 15 (SH 15), east of Capulin, with Colorado State Highway 368 (SH 368) east of Estrella.

== Route description ==
SH 371 begins at a T intersection with SH 15 in northeastern Conejos County, about 4 miles (6.4 km) east of Capulin and about 5 miles (8.0 km) west of La Jara. From its southern teriminus it heads due north as a two–lane road through a rural agriculture area for the length of its course. Approximately 0.9 miles (1.4 km) along its course, SH 371 crosses the Alamosa River and then crosses or connects with several county roads. Roughly 4.1 miles (6.6 km) north of the river SH 371 crosses Conejos County Road CC (CR CC).

North of CR CC, SH 371 continues along the Conejos–Alamosa county line (with Conejos County on the west and Alamosa County on the east). One mile (1.6 km) further north, SH reaches its northern terminus at a junction with SH 368 and Conejos County Road DD (CR DD), about 6.9 miles (11.1 km) west of Estrella. (CR DD heads west, while SH 368 heads east toward U.S. Route 285 and Estrella. SH 368 continues north toward Colorado State Highway 370 and Monte Vista.)

== Major intersections ==
County	Location	mi	km	Destinations	Notes
Conejos		0.000	0.000	SH 15 east – La Jara SH 15 west – Capulin, Monte Vista	Southern terminus; T intersecction
Conejos		0.9	1.4	Bridge over the Alamosa River	
Conejos–Alamosa county line		6.067	9.764	SH 368 east – US 285, Alamosa; Conejos CR DD west	Northern terminus
Conejos–Alamosa county line		6.067	9.764	SH 368 west – SH 370, Monte Vista	Continuation north from northern terminus
1.000 mi = 1.609 km; 1.000 km = 0.621 mi

== See also ==
- List of state highways in Colorado
