= Colorado State Highway 370 =

State highway in Colorado, United States

State Highway 370
- Road 10S
- SH 370 highlighted in red

Route information
- Maintained by CDOT
- Length: 14.115 mi (22.716 km)

Major junctions
- West end: SH 15 near Monte Vista National Wildlife Refuge
- East end: US 285 / SH 17 near Alamosa

Location
- Country: United States
- State: Colorado
- Counties: Alamosa, Rio Grande

Highway system
- Colorado State Highway System; Interstate; US; State; Scenic
← SH 368	→ SH 371

State Highway 370 (SH 370) is a state highway near Alamosa, Colorado. SH 370's western terminus is at SH 15 near Monte Vista National Wildlife Refuge, and the eastern terminus is at U.S. Route 285 (US 285) south of Alamosa.

== Route description ==
SH 370 runs 14.1 miles (22.7 km), starting at a junction with SH 15 near Monte Vista National Wildlife Refuge and ending straight east at a junction with US 285 just south of Alamosa.

== Major intersections ==
County	Location	mi	km	Destinations	Notes
Rio Grande		0.000	0.000	SH 15 – Monte Vista National Wildlife Refuge	Western terminus; road continues as Road 10S
Rio Grande		3.99	6.42	SH 368 – La Jara	Western terminus of SH 368
Alamosa		14.115	22.716	US 285 (SH 17) – Alamosa, La Jara	Eastern terminus; road continues as Road 10S
1.000 mi = 1.609 km; 1.000 km = 0.621 mi
