= Colorado State Highway 136 =

State highway in Colorado, United States

State Highway 136
- SH 136 highlighted in red

Route information
- Maintained by CDOT
- Length: 4.469 mi (7.192 km)

Major junctions
- West end: US 285 / SH 17 in La Jara
- East end: Ivy Street in Sanford

Location
- Country: United States
- State: Colorado
- Counties: Conejos

Highway system
- Colorado State Highway System; Interstate; US; State; Scenic
← SH 135	→ SH 139

State Highway 136 (SH 136) is a 4.469-mile-long (7.192 km) state highway in southern Colorado. It runs from an intersection with U.S. Highway 285 (US 285) in La Jara southeast to the community of Sanford.

== Route description ==
SH 136 begins in the west at US 285 and Main Street in La Jara and proceeds east to Sanford where the route turns abruptly south shortly before reaching its eastern end at an intersection with Ivy Street in Sanford. The roadway continues southward after the route's terminus, as Main Street.

== History ==
The route was established in the 1920s, when it began at U.S. Highway 285 and ended at SH 159, using a concurrency with SH 142 near San Acacio. The route was paved to its current terminus by 1939, and the rest of the road was deleted in 1954, leaving what it is today.

== Major intersections ==
The entire route is in Conejos County.

Location	mi	km	Destinations	Notes
La Jara	0.000	0.000	US 285 (SH 17) – Antonito, Alamosa	Western terminus; road continues as Joe S. Chavez Drive
Sanford	4.469	7.192	Ivy Street	Eastern terminus; road continues south as Main Street
1.000 mi = 1.609 km; 1.000 km = 0.621 mi
