= Bountiful, Colorado =

Unincorporated community in Conejos County, Colorado, United States

- unincorporated community
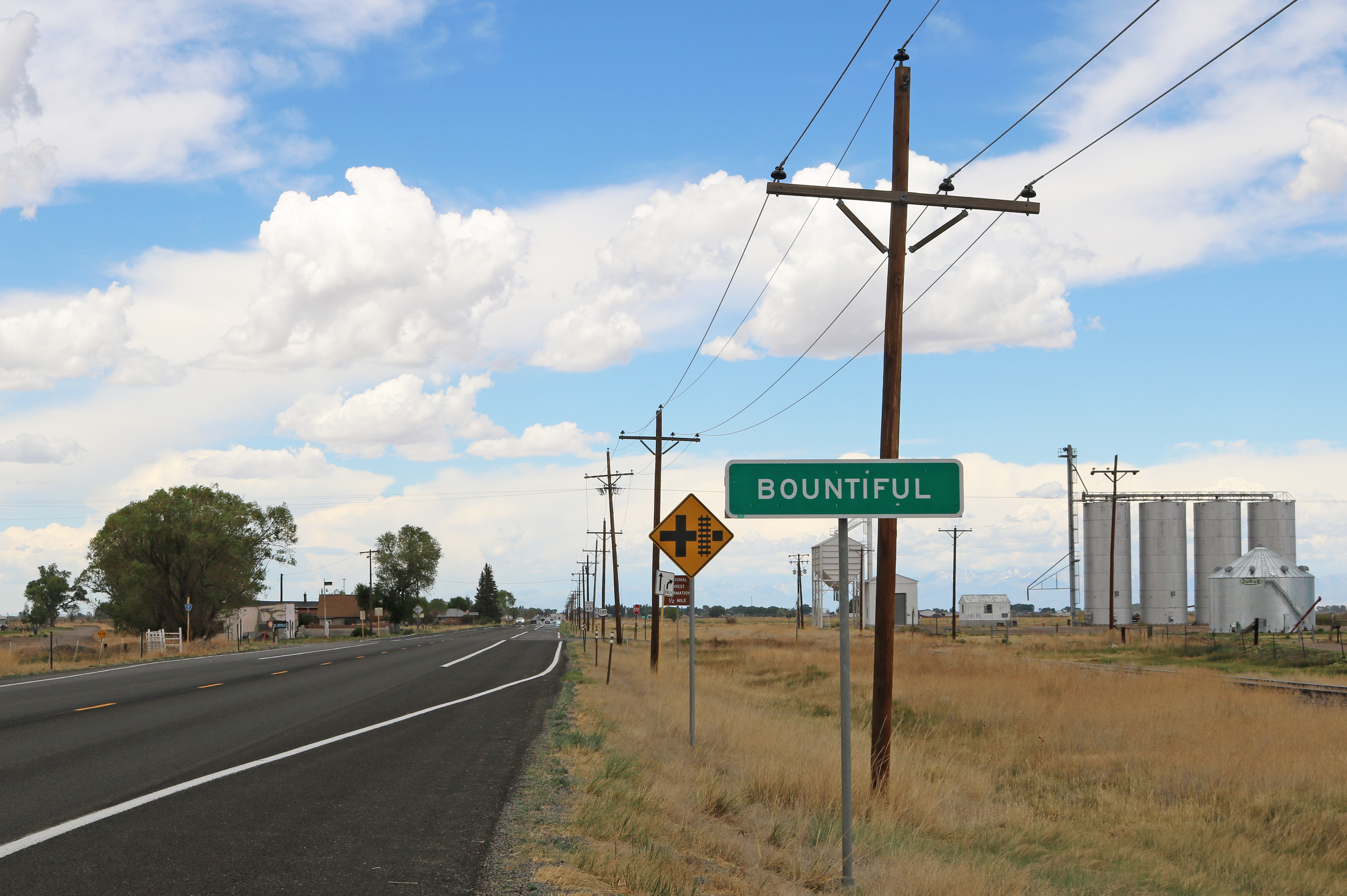
- Entering from the south along Highway 285.

- Location of Bountiful, Colorado. Bountiful (Colorado)
- Coordinates: 37.2292°N 105.9770°W
- Country: United States
- State: Colorado
- County: Conejos

Government
  - Type: unincorporated community
  - Body: Conejos County
- Elevation: 7,645 ft (2,330 m)
- Time zone: UTC−07:00 (MST)
  - Summer (DST): UTC−06:00 (MDT)
- GNIS pop ID: 192987

Bountiful is an unincorporated community in Conejos County, in the U.S. state of Colorado.

The community is on the Colorado Pacific Rio Grande Railroad, between Romeo to the south and La Jara to the north.

== History ==
The name Bountiful most likely is Mormon in origin. Bountiful has never had a post office.

== See also ==
- List of populated places in Colorado
