= Colorado State Highway 15 =

State highway in Colorado, United States

State Highway 15
- SH 15 highlighted in red

Route information
- Maintained by CDOT
- Length: 22.834 mi (36.748 km)

Major junctions
- North end: US 160 / US 285 in Monte Vista
- East end: US 285 / SH 17 near La Jara

Location
- Country: United States
- State: Colorado
- Counties: Rio Grande, Conejos

Highway system
- Colorado State Highway System; Interstate; US; State; Scenic
← SH 14	→ SH 16

State Highway 15 in the U.S. state of Colorado is a north–south, then east–west, state highway in the San Luis Valley region of Southern Colorado. It connects the two towns of Monte Vista and La Jara. There is a gap in the route.

== Route description ==
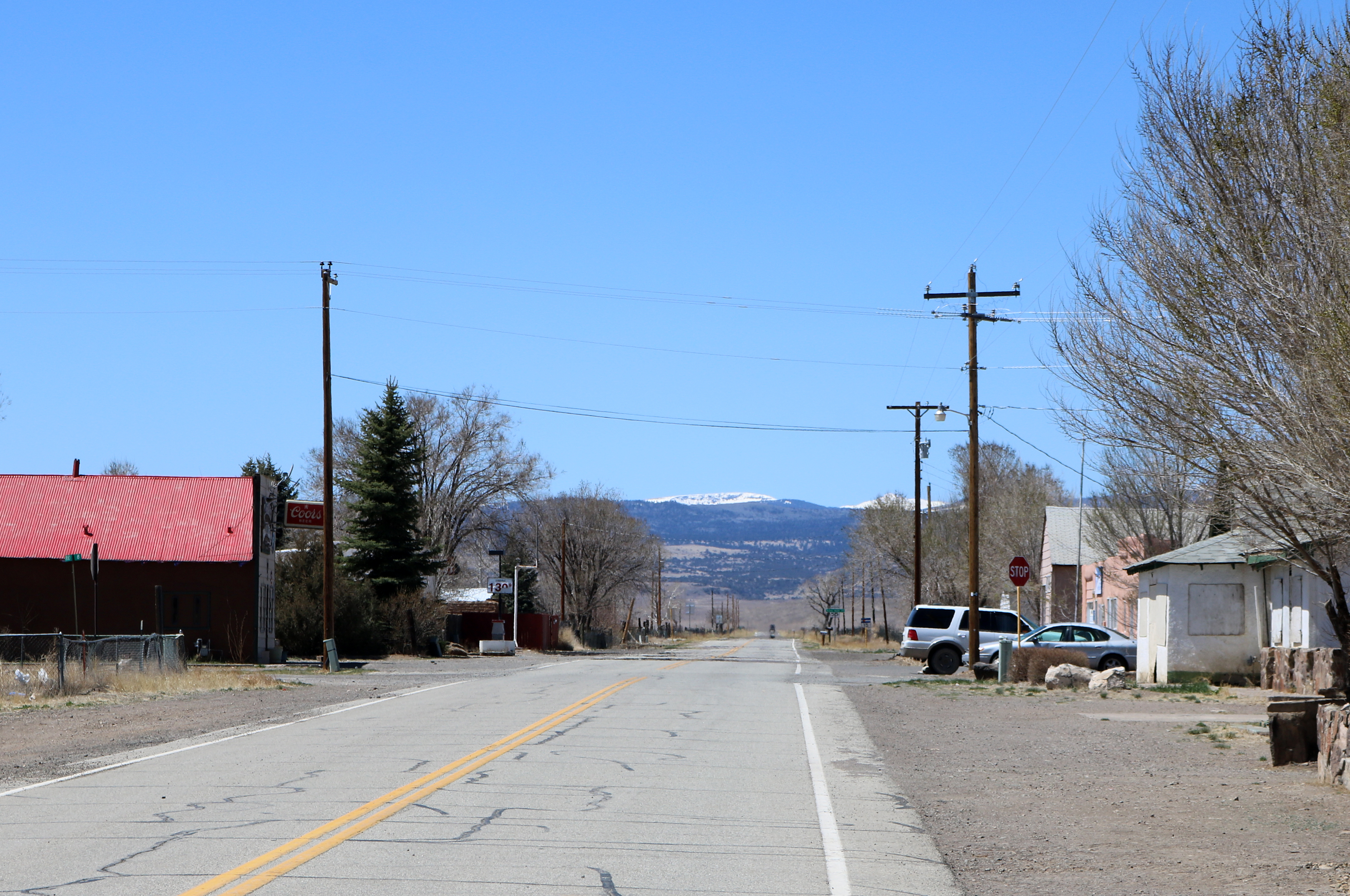
SH 15 looking west in Capulin, April 2018

SH 15 begins at a concurrency between US 285 and US 160. After heading south for about 12 miles (19 km), at the Rio Grande-Conejos county line, there exists an 8-mile (13 km) gap filled in by Conejos County Route 6. After the gap, SH 15 reappears in Centro and heads east to pass through Capulin, cross over the La Jara Creek, and end at US 285, north of La Jara.

== History ==
The route was established in the 1920s as a much longer route, but it was gradually cut down to its current length. The route was paved in 1957.

== Major intersections ==
County	Location	mi	km	Destinations	Notes
Rio Grande	Monte Vista	0.000	0.000	US 160 (1st Street) / US 285	Northern terminus; highway continues as US 285 north (Broadway north)
Rio Grande		10.41	16.75	SH 370 east	
Rio Grande–Conejos county line		12.37	19.91	CR 12S	End state maintenance
Road 6 continues south
Conejos	Centro	20.39	32.81	FH 255	Begin state maintenance
Conejos		26.56	42.74	SH 371 – Carmel Dist.	
Conejos		30.915	49.753	US 285 (SH 17) – Alamosa, La Jara, Antonito	Eastern terminus
1.000 mi = 1.609 km; 1.000 km = 0.621 mi

== See also ==
- List of state highways in Colorado
