= Gerrard, Colorado =

Census-designated place in Rio Grande County, CO, USA

- Census-designated place
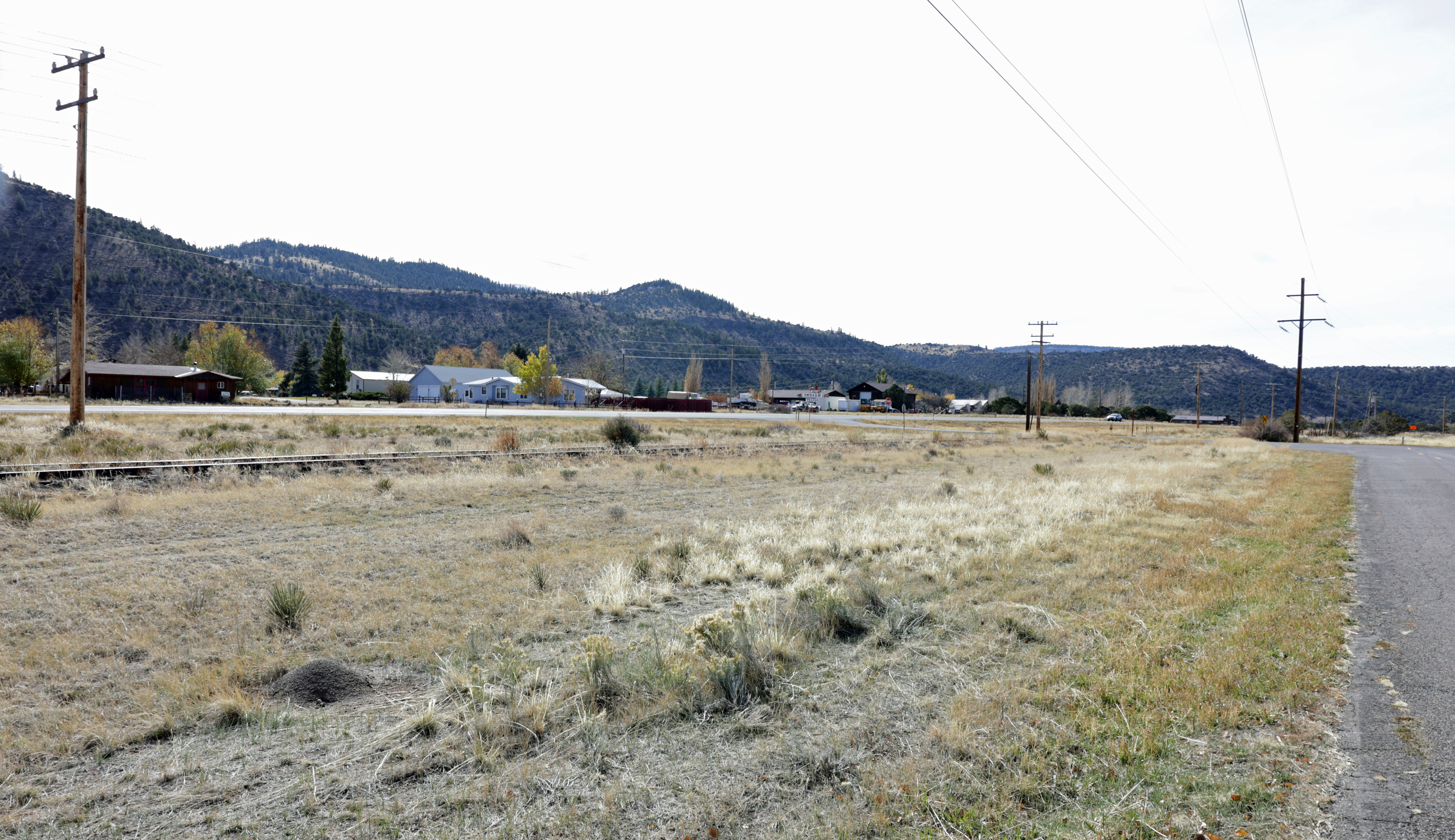
- Gerrard in 2023

- Location of the Gerrard CDP in Rio Grande County, Colorado
- Coordinates: 37°40′42″N 106°34′31″W
- Country: United States
- State: Colorado
- County: Rio Grande County

Government
  - Type: Unincorporated community

Area
  - Total: 1.198 sq mi (3.103 km^{2})
  - Land: 1.198 sq mi (3.103 km^{2})
  - Water: 0 sq mi (0.000 km^{2})
- Elevation: 8,124 ft (2,476 m)

Population (2020)
  - Total: 264
- Time zone: UTC-7 (MST)
  - Summer (DST): UTC-6 (MDT)
- ZIP Code: South Fork 81154
- Area code: 719
- GNIS feature ID: 2583239

Gerrard is a census-designated place (CDP) in and governed by Rio Grande County, Colorado, United States. The population of the Gerrard CDP was 264 at the 2020 United States Census. The South Fork post office (Zip Code 81154) serves the area.

== Geography ==
The Gerrard CDP has an area of 767 acres (3.103 km^{2}), all land.

== Demographics ==
Gerrard CDP, Colorado
Year	Pop.	±%
2010	278	—
2020	264	−5.0%
Source: United States Census Bureau

The United States Census Bureau initially defined the Gerrard CDP for the United States Census 2010.

== See also ==
- List of census-designated places in Colorado
