= Fox Creek, Colorado =

Coordinates: 37°03′56″N 106°12′05″W

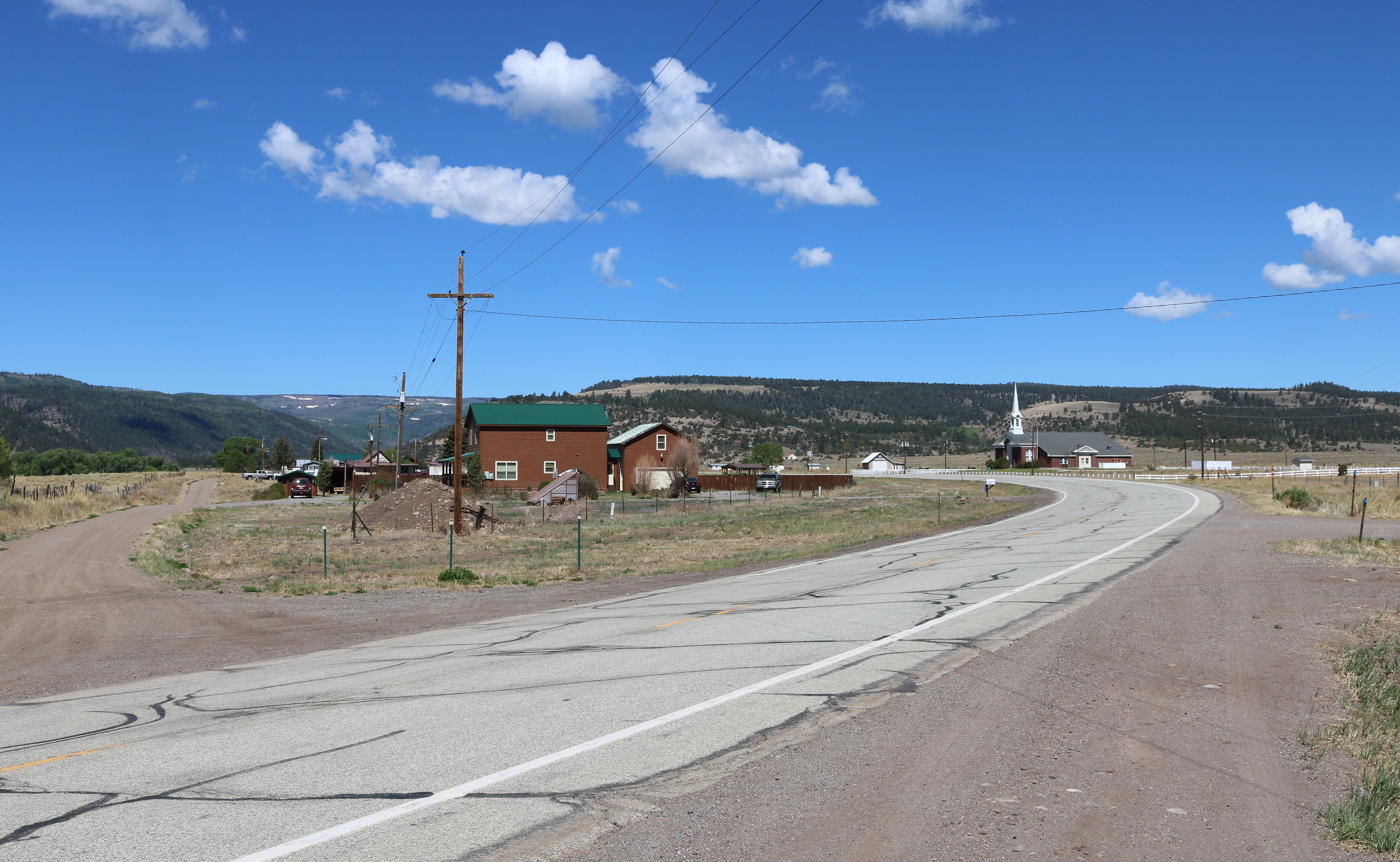
Fox Creek and State Highway 17

Fox Creek is an unincorporated community in Conejos County, in the U.S. state of Colorado.

== History ==
The first settlement at Fox Creek was made in 1887 by a colony of Mormons. Some of the settlers were Catawba converts to Mormonism. The community takes its name from a nearby creek where foxes were abundant.
