= Waverly, Alamosa County, Colorado =

Coordinates: 37°25′47″N 106°00′22″W

Waverly is a small, unincorporated populated place in western Alamosa County, south-central Colorado, United States. Situated on the floor of the San Luis Valley at an elevation of 7,589 feet (2,313 m), it lies roughly 11 mi (18 km) west-south-west of the city of Alamosa along U.S. Highway 160 and the Rio Grande Southern Railroad.

== History ==
Originally located in Conejos County, farmers built the community in March 1886 and by December 1886 a school building had been constructed. A wave of Dutch émigrés arrived in Waverly in 1892 by railroad. It was platted in 1903 by F. C. Grable. The village was connected to the Colorado & Southern Railroad In 1903. A second wave of newcomers settled in the 1930s during the Dust Bowl supported by the FSA Resettlement Project (Part of the New Deal)

The name “Waverly” was suggested after Sir Walter Scott's 1814 novel of the same name.

== Demographics ==
Because Waverly is unincorporated, the U.S. Census Bureau does not publish separate population figures; it is enumerated within Alamosa County census tracts. Neighborhood-level data compiled by BestNeighborhood.org suggest the immediate Waverly area contains roughly 100–150 residents:

- White (non-Hispanic): 68.8%
- Hispanic or Latino: 29.2%
- Black, Asian, Native American: each < 1%
- Median household income: ≈ $45,000 (county-wide: $43,000)
- Home-ownership rate: ~86 %

== Economy and infrastructure ==
The economy is shaped by land and livestock business.

Transportation in the area uses the following roads:

- County Road 72 on the north
- County Road 11 on the east
- County Road 21 on the west
- County Road 64 on the south

== Points of interest ==
- The historic school building now employed as an alternative Teen Learning Center and occasionally as a community hall.
- Alamosa Christian Reformed Church established as Dutch Reformed Church by the Dutch settlers in 1908

== See also ==
- Alamosa County, Colorado
- Rio Grande Southern Railroad
- San Luis Valley
- 1911: “History of Larimer County,” by Ansel Watrous
