= Alpine, Rio Grande County, Colorado =

Census-designated place in Rio Grande County, Colorado, United States

Alpine, Colorado
- Census-designated place
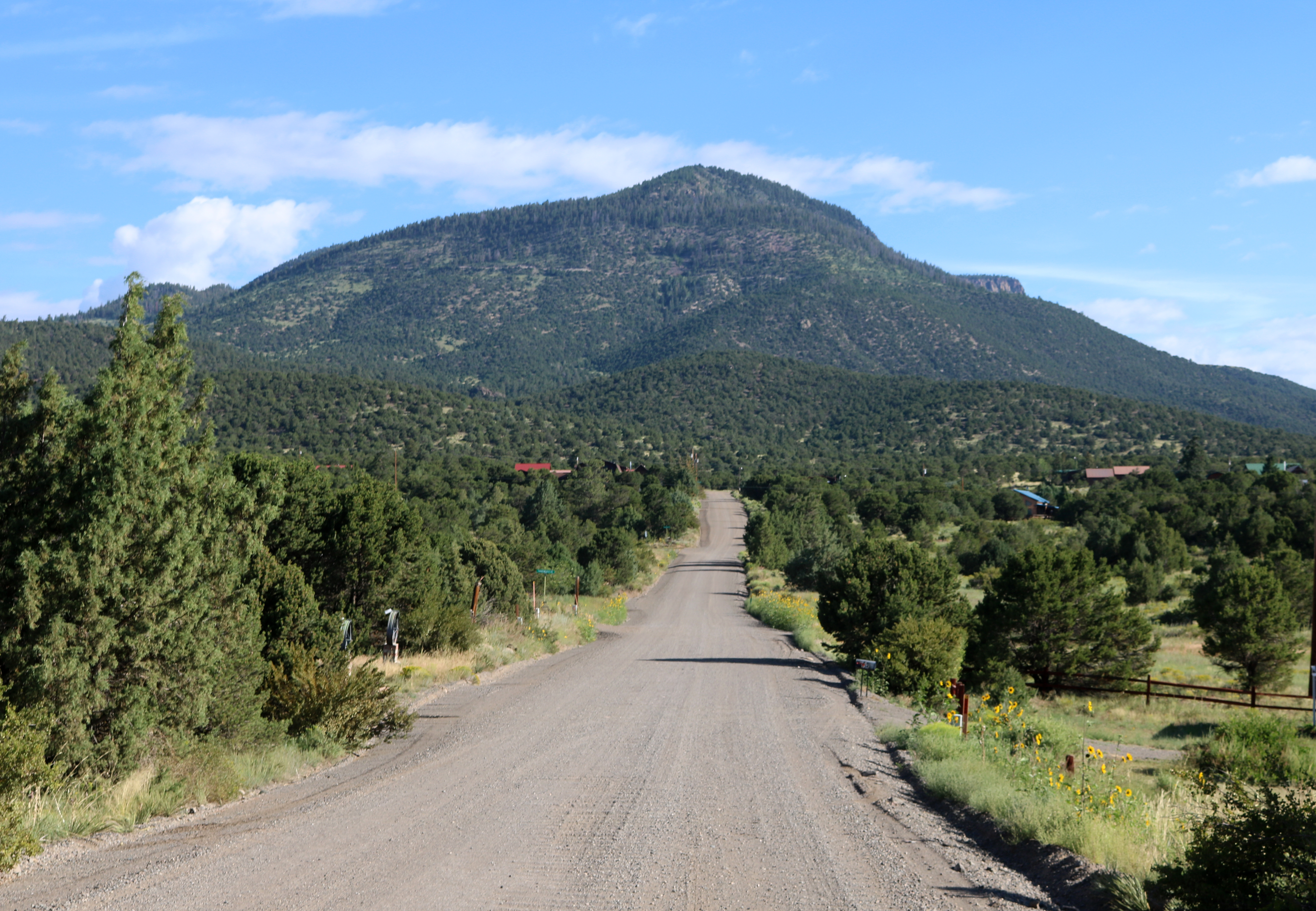
- Looking north along Arapaho Road in Alpine.

- Location of the Alpine CDP in Rio Grande County, Colorado
- Coordinates: 37°41′16″N 106°35′10″W
- Country: United States
- State: Colorado
- County: Rio Grande

Government
  - Type: Unincorporated community
  - Body: Rio Grande County

Area
  - Total: 1.051 sq mi (2.721 km^{2})
  - Land: 1.051 sq mi (2.721 km^{2})
  - Water: 0 sq mi (0.000 km^{2})
- Elevation: 8,288 ft (2,526 m)

Population (2020)
  - Total: 169
  - Density: 161/sq mi (62.1/km^{2})
- Time zone: UTC−07:00 (MST)
  - Summer (DST): UTC−06:00 (MDT)
- ZIP Code: South Fork 81154
- Area code: 719
- GNIS CDP ID: 2583207
- FIPS code: 01640

Alpine is an unincorporated community and a census-designated place (CDP) located in and governed by Rio Grande County, Colorado, United States. The population of the Alpine CDP was 169 at the 2020 United States census. The South Fork post office (Zip Code 81154) serves the area.

== Geography ==
Alpine is located about 3 miles (4.8 km) east of South Fork at an elevation of 8,288 feet (2,526 m).

At the 2020 United States census, the Alpine CDP has an area of 672 acres (2.721 km^{2}), all land.

== Demographics ==
The United States Census Bureau initially defined the Alpine CDP for the 2010 United States census.

Alpine CDP, Colorado
| Year | Pop. | ±% |
|---|---|---|
| 2010 | 174 | — |
| 2020 | 169 | −2.9% |
Source: United States Census Bureau

== See also ==
- List of census-designated places in Colorado
