= Platoro, Colorado =

Unincorporated community in Conejos County, CO, USA

Coordinates: 37°21′07″N 106°31′58″W

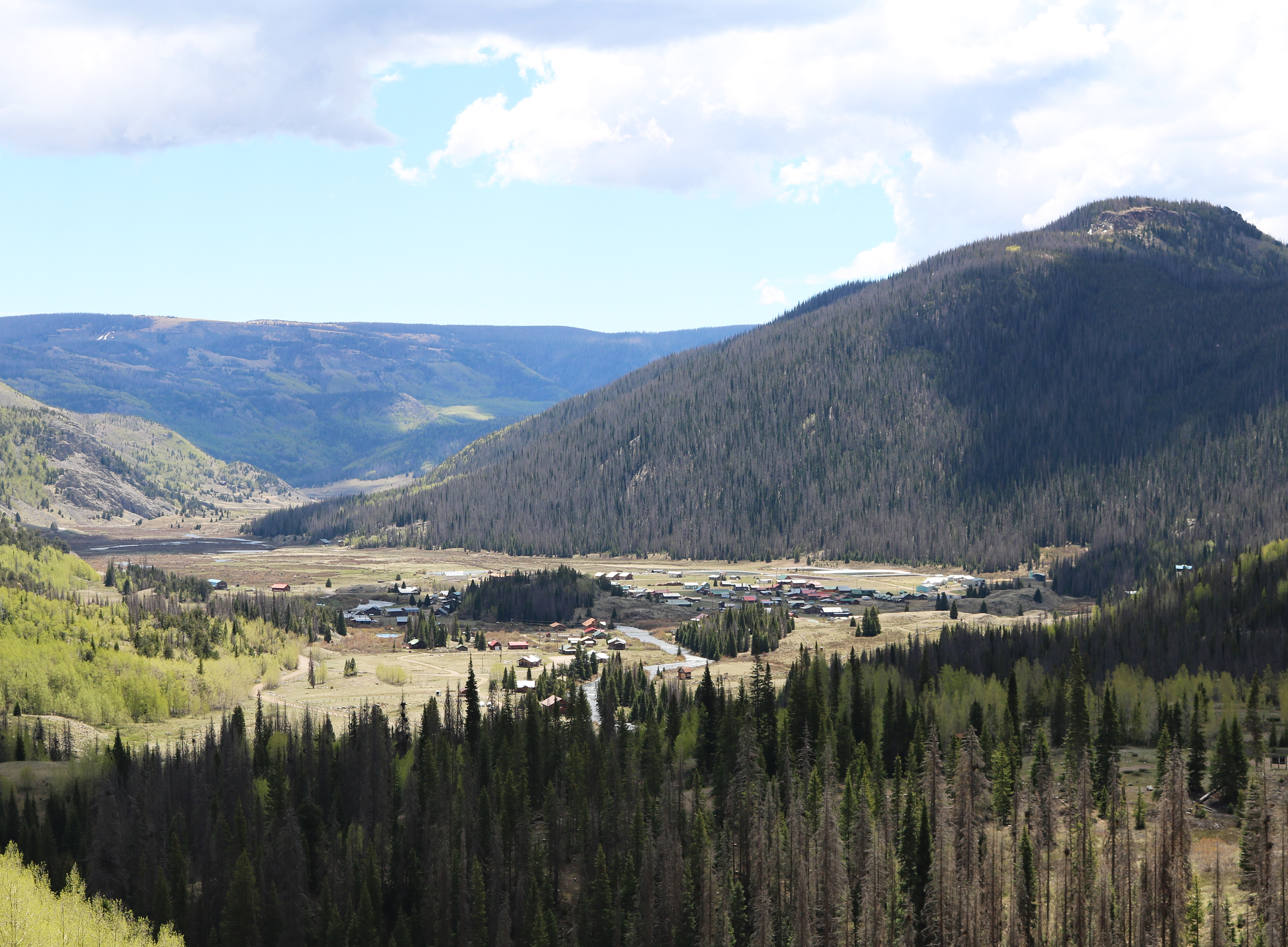
Platoro from Forest Road 250 above the town

Platoro is an unincorporated community in Conejos County, in the U.S. state of Colorado.

== History ==
A post office called Platoro was established in 1888, and remained in operation until 1919. Platoro is a name derived from Spanish meaning "silver and gold".

== See also ==
- Platoro Dam
- Media related to Platoro, Colorado at Wikimedia Commons
