= Alamosa County, Colorado =

County in Colorado, United States

- County
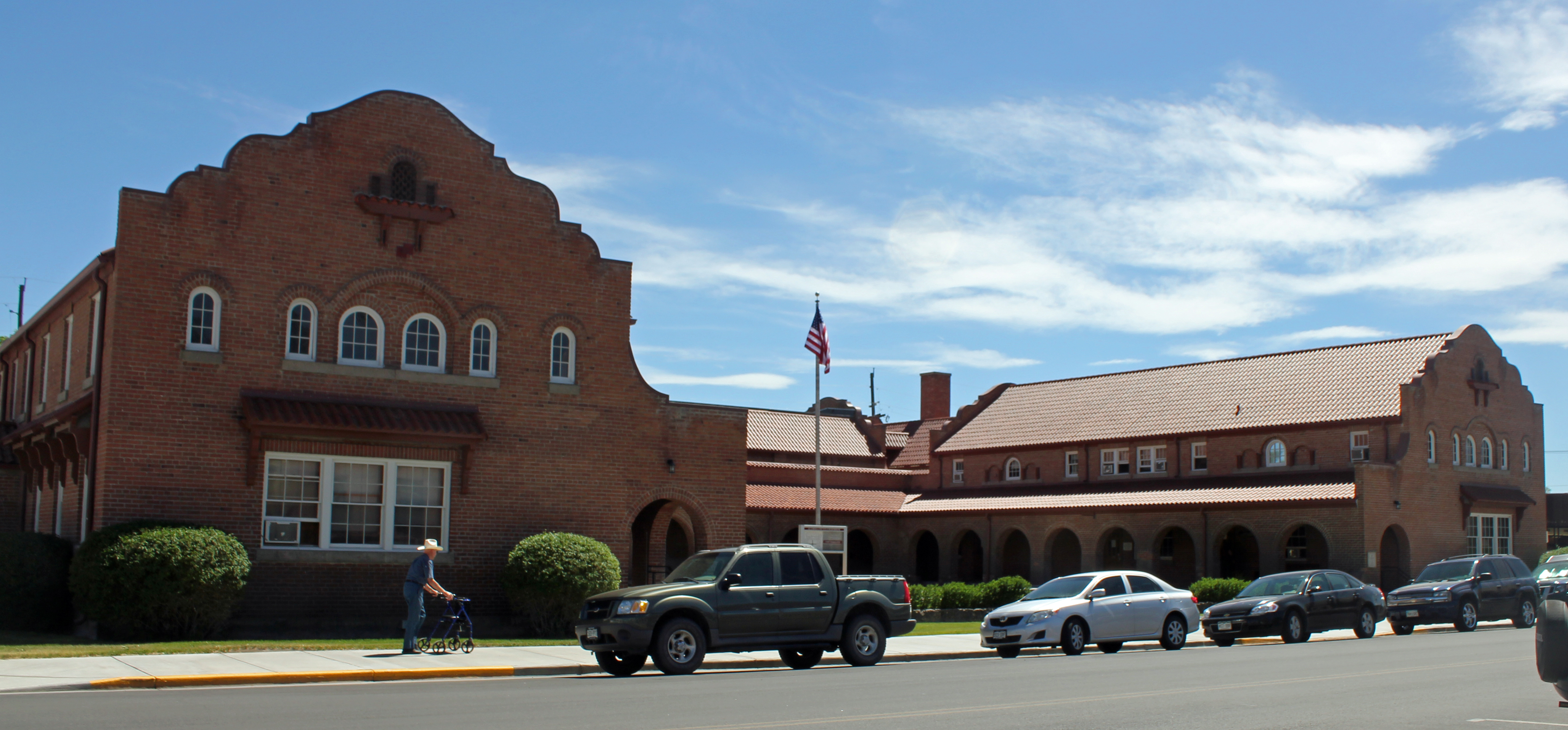
- Alamosa County Courthouse

- Location within the U.S. state of Colorado
- Coordinates: 37.57°N 105.78°W
- Country: United States
- State: Colorado
- Founded: March 8, 1913
- Named for: Spanish language word for a grove of cottonwood trees
- Seat: Alamosa
- Largest city: Alamosa

Area
  - Total: 723 sq mi (1,870 km^{2})
  - Land: 723 sq mi (1,870 km^{2})
  - Water: 0.7 sq mi (1.8 km^{2}) 0.1%

Population (2020)
  - Total: 16,376
  - Estimate (2025): 16,688 ▲
  - Density: 22.7/sq mi (8.75/km^{2})
- Time zone: UTC−7 (Mountain)
  - Summer (DST): UTC−6 (MDT)
- Congressional district: 3rd
- Website: www.alamosacounty.org

Alamosa County is a county located in the U.S. state of Colorado. As of the 2020 census, the population was 16,376. The county seat is Alamosa. The county name is the Spanish language word for a grove of cottonwood trees.

== History ==
Alamosa County was created by the Colorado legislature on March 8, 1913, out of northwestern Costilla County.

== Geography ==
According to the U.S. Census Bureau, the county has a total area of 723 square miles (1,870 km^{2}), of which 723 square miles (1,870 km^{2}) is land and 0.7 square miles (1.8 km^{2}) (0.1%) is water.

=== Adjacent counties ===
- Saguache County, Colorado - north
- Huerfano County, Colorado - east
- Costilla County, Colorado - southeast
- Conejos County, Colorado - southwest
- Rio Grande County, Colorado - west

=== Major highways ===
- U.S. Highway 160
- U.S. Highway 285
- State Highway 17
- State Highway 150
- State Highway 368
- State Highway 370
- State Highway 371

=== National protected area ===
- Great Sand Dunes National Park and Preserve

=== Other protected areas ===
- Alamosa National Wildlife Refuge
- Great Sand Dunes Wilderness
- Monte Vista National Wildlife Refuge
- Rio Grande National Forest
- San Luis Lakes State Wildlife Area
- Sangre de Cristo Wilderness

=== Scenic trails ===
- Los Caminos Antiguos Scenic and Historic Byway
- Old Spanish National Historic Trail

== Transportation ==
Alamosa is served by San Luis Valley Regional Airport. The only commercial service is to Denver.

== Demographics ==
Historical population
Census	Pop.	Note	%±
1920	5,148		—
1930	8,602		67.1%
1940	10,484		21.9%
1950	10,531		0.4%
1960	10,000		−5.0%
1970	11,422		14.2%
1980	11,799		3.3%
1990	13,617		15.4%
2000	14,966		9.9%
2010	15,445		3.2%
2020	16,376		6.0%
2025 (est.)	16,688	▲	1.9%
U.S. Decennial Census; 1790-1960 1900-1990; 1990-2000 2010-2020

=== 2020 census ===
As of the 2020 census, the county had a population of 16,376. Of the residents, 23.4% were under the age of 18 and 16.2% were 65 years of age or older; the median age was 35.0 years. For every 100 females there were 96.0 males, and for every 100 females age 18 and over there were 93.1 males. 67.0% of residents lived in urban areas and 33.0% lived in rural areas.

Alamosa County, Colorado – Racial and ethnic composition Note: the US Census treats Hispanic/Latino as an ethnic category. This table excludes Latinos from the racial categories and assigns them to a separate category. Hispanics/Latinos may be of any race.
Race / Ethnicity (NH = Non-Hispanic)	Pop 2000	Pop 2010	Pop 2020	% 2000	% 2010	% 2020
White alone (NH)	8,089	7,667	7,490	54.05%	49.64%	45.74%
Black or African American alone (NH)	106	138	211	0.71%	0.89%	1.29%
Native American or Alaska Native alone (NH)	186	134	215	1.24%	0.87%	1.31%
Asian alone (NH)	112	130	142	0.75%	0.84%	0.87%
Pacific Islander alone (NH)	12	6	19	0.08%	0.04%	0.12%
Other race alone (NH)	38	33	104	0.25%	0.21%	0.64%
Mixed race or Multiracial (NH)	226	227	494	1.51%	1.47%	3.02%
Hispanic or Latino (any race)	6,197	7,110	7,701	41.41%	46.03%	47.03%
Total	14,966	15,445	16,376	100.00%	100.00%	100.00%

The racial makeup of the county was 61.5% White, 1.5% Black or African American, 4.3% American Indian and Alaska Native, 1.1% Asian, 0.1% Native Hawaiian and Pacific Islander, 13.7% from some other race, and 17.7% from two or more races. Hispanic or Latino residents of any race comprised 47.0% of the population.

There were 6,377 households in the county, of which 30.1% had children under the age of 18 living with them and 30.2% had a female householder with no spouse or partner present. About 32.5% of all households were made up of individuals and 12.0% had someone living alone who was 65 years of age or older.

There were 7,064 housing units, of which 9.7% were vacant. Among occupied housing units, 58.0% were owner-occupied and 42.0% were renter-occupied. The homeowner vacancy rate was 1.7% and the rental vacancy rate was 7.9%.

=== 2000 census ===
At the 2000 census there were 14,966 people, 5,467 households, and 3,651 families living in the county. The population density was 21 people per square mile (8.1 people/km^{2}). There were 6,088 housing units at an average density of 8 per square mile (3.1/km^{2}). The racial makeup of the county was 71.19% White, 0.97% Black or African American, 2.34% Native American, 0.82% Asian, 0.19% Pacific Islander, 20.34% from other races, and 4.16% from two or more races. 41.41% of the population were Hispanic or Latino of any race. Of the 5,467 households 35.30% had children under the age of 18 living with them, 50.50% were married couples living together, 11.70% had a female householder with no husband present, and 33.20% were non-families. 27.30% of households were one person and 8.70% were one person aged 65 or older. The average household size was 2.56 and the average family size was 3.14.

The age distribution was 27.20% under the age of 18, 15.90% from 18 to 24, 26.70% from 25 to 44, 20.60% from 45 to 64, and 9.60% 65 or older. The median age was 31 years. For every 100 females there were 99.00 males. For every 100 females age 18 and over, there were 95.30 males.

The median household income was $29,447 and the median family income was $38,389. Males had a median income of $27,733 versus $22,806 for females. The per capita income for the county was $15,037. About 15.60% of families and 21.30% of the population were below the poverty line, including 27.40% of those under age 18 and 13.90% of those age 65 or over.

In 2000, the largest denominational groups were Catholics (with 5,716 members) and Evangelical Protestants (with 1,755 members). The largest religious bodies were the Catholic Church (with 5,716 adherents) and the Church of Jesus Christ of Latter-day Saints (with 1,155 adherents).

== Politics ==
United States presidential election results for Alamosa County, Colorado
Year	Republican		Democratic		Third party(ies)	
Year	No.	%	No.	%	No.	%
1916	488	26.15%	1,308	70.10%	70	3.75%
1920	1,081	51.87%	949	45.54%	54	2.59%
1924	1,009	40.59%	625	25.14%	852	34.27%
1928	1,759	58.23%	1,239	41.01%	23	0.76%
1932	1,306	36.96%	2,141	60.58%	87	2.46%
1936	1,188	29.71%	2,754	68.87%	57	1.43%
1940	2,243	47.39%	2,467	52.12%	23	0.49%
1944	1,933	51.56%	1,806	48.17%	10	0.27%
1948	1,950	44.58%	2,395	54.76%	29	0.66%
1952	2,728	62.13%	1,626	37.03%	37	0.84%
1956	2,442	62.33%	1,465	37.39%	11	0.28%
1960	2,271	55.58%	1,811	44.32%	4	0.10%
1964	1,488	37.42%	2,481	62.40%	7	0.18%
1968	2,277	55.00%	1,574	38.02%	289	6.98%
1972	2,916	62.51%	1,540	33.01%	209	4.48%
1976	2,599	53.51%	2,052	42.25%	206	4.24%
1980	2,601	53.87%	1,821	37.72%	406	8.41%
1984	2,953	62.68%	1,720	36.51%	38	0.81%
1988	2,567	53.70%	2,146	44.90%	67	1.40%
1992	1,572	34.05%	1,928	41.76%	1,117	24.19%
1996	2,038	41.23%	2,330	47.14%	575	11.63%
2000	2,857	50.49%	2,455	43.38%	347	6.13%
2004	3,179	50.63%	3,017	48.05%	83	1.32%
2008	2,635	41.92%	3,521	56.01%	130	2.07%
2012	2,705	40.28%	3,811	56.75%	199	2.96%
2016	3,046	43.90%	3,189	45.96%	704	10.15%
2020	3,813	48.83%	3,759	48.14%	236	3.02%
2024	4,057	53.88%	3,244	43.09%	228	3.03%

United States Senate election results for Alamosa County, Colorado2
Year	Republican		Democratic		Third party(ies)	
Year	No.	%	No.	%	No.	%
2020	3,800	49.63%	3,734	48.77%	123	1.61%

United States Senate election results for Alamosa County, Colorado3
Year	Republican		Democratic		Third party(ies)	
Year	No.	%	No.	%	No.	%
2022	2,734	46.11%	2,999	50.58%	196	3.31%

Colorado Gubernatorial election results for Alamosa County
Year	Republican		Democratic		Third party(ies)	
Year	No.	%	No.	%	No.	%
2022	2,674	45.16%	3,022	51.04%	225	3.80%

Alamosa County is a competitive swing county, voting for the winning presidential candidate in every election since its formation except 1944, 1960, 1976, 2016, and 2020.

== Communities ==
=== City ===
- Alamosa

=== Town ===
- Hooper

=== Census-designated place ===
- Alamosa East

=== Unincorporated communities ===
- Estrella
- Hartner
- Henry
- La Fruto
- Mosca
- Waverly

== Sheriff's Office ==
Alamosa County Sheriff's Office

Agency overview
- Preceding agency: Municipal Police
- Employees: 39

Jurisdictional structure
- Operations jurisdiction: Alamosa County, Colorado, U.S.
- Population: 16376
- General nature: Local civilian police

Operational structure
- Headquarters: 1315 17th Street Alamosa, Colorado 81101
- Sworn members: 18
- Unsworn members: 21
- Agency executive: Robert Jackson, Sheriff

Website
- https://www.alamosacounty.org

The Alamosa County Sheriff's Office is a county law enforcement agency in Alamosa County, Colorado, United States. It consists of 18 sworn law enforcement officers and 21 civilian support personnel.

=== Rank structure ===
Title	Insignia
Sheriff	
Undersheriff	
Sergeant	
Corporal	
Deputy

== License plate code ==
Alamosa County has used the following county codes on Colorado license plates issued to passenger vehicles in the county: XE-XG and EAA-ABD.

== See also ==
- Bibliography of Colorado
- Geography of Colorado
  - San Luis Valley
- History of Colorado
  - National Register of Historic Places listings in Alamosa County, Colorado
- Index of Colorado-related articles
- List of Colorado-related lists
  - List of counties in Colorado
- Outline of Colorado
