= Rio Grande County, Colorado =

County in Colorado, United States

- County
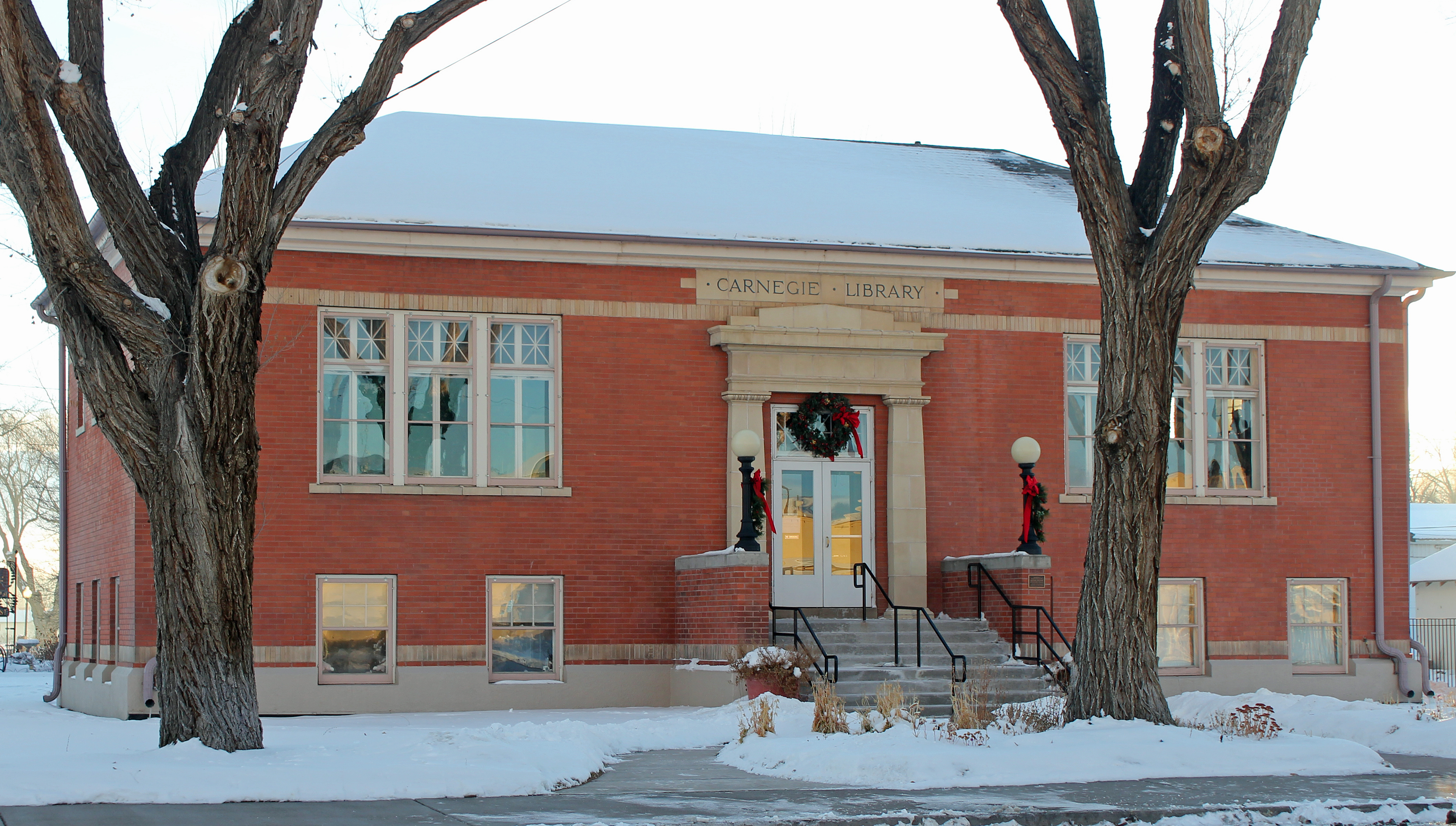
- Carnegie Library (Monte Vista, Colorado)

- Location within the U.S. state of Colorado
- Coordinates: 37.61°N 106.39°W
- Country: United States
- State: Colorado
- Founded: February 10, 1874
- Named for: Rio Grande
- Seat: Del Norte
- Largest city: Monte Vista

Area
  - Total: 912 sq mi (2,360 km^{2})
  - Land: 912 sq mi (2,360 km^{2})
  - Water: 0.4 sq mi (1.0 km^{2}) 0.04%

Population (2020)
  - Total: 11,539
  - Estimate (2025): 11,087 ▼
  - Density: 12.7/sq mi (4.89/km^{2})
- Time zone: UTC−7 (Mountain)
  - Summer (DST): UTC−6 (MDT)
- Congressional district: 3rd
- Website: riograndecounty.colorado.gov

Rio Grande County is a county located in the U.S. state of Colorado. As of the 2020 census, the population was 11,539. The county seat is Del Norte. The county is named for the Rio Grande (Spanish language for "Big River"), which flows through the county.

== Description ==
The gateway to the San Juan Mountains, Rio Grande County is one of the highlights of the San Luis Valley. The county covers 913 square miles (2,360 km^{2}) ranging from approximately 7,000 feet (2,100 m) on valley floor to several 13,000-foot (4,000 m) peaks. There are three municipalities within the county, Monte Vista, Del Norte, and South Fork and all have been historically developed along the rail line that follows the Rio Grande.

Monte Vista is the county's largest community situated on the valley floor. "Monte", as locals call it, is the center of the agricultural aspect of the county. There are numerous festivals, events, and clubs that take place in and around Monte Vista, and the Monte Vista National Wildlife Refuge is a stop for migratory Sand Hill Cranes every year. Del Norte is a quaint town with a focus on its historic past; it is the county seat, home to the Rio Grande County Museum, and maintains a historic façade in its main street.

The newest town in Rio Grande County is South Fork. Originally developed as a logging center, South Fork's economy has transitioned towards real estate development and tourism. South Fork is surrounded by the Rio Grande National Forest and other public lands and has access to Wolf Creek Ski Area. Other attractions include an 18-hole golf course and the northern terminus of the Silver Thread scenic byway.

== Geography ==
According to the U.S. Census Bureau, the county has a total area of 912 square miles (2,360 km^{2}), of which 912 square miles (2,360 km^{2}) is land and 0.4 square miles (1.0 km^{2}) (0.04%) is water.

=== Adjacent counties ===
- Saguache County - north
- Alamosa County - east
- Conejos County - south
- Archuleta County - southwest
- Mineral County - west

=== Major highways ===
- U.S. Highway 160
- U.S. Highway 285
- State Highway 15
- State Highway 112
- State Highway 149
- State Highway 368
- State Highway 370

=== National protected areas ===
- Monte Vista National Wildlife Refuge
- Rio Grande National Forest

=== Trails and byways ===
- Continental Divide National Scenic Trail
- Old Spanish National Historic Trail
- Silver Thread Scenic Byway

== Demographics ==
Historical population
| Census | Pop. | Note | %± |
|---|---|---|---|
| 1880 | 1,944 | | — |
| 1890 | 3,451 | | 77.5% |
| 1900 | 4,080 | | 18.2% |
| 1910 | 6,563 | | 60.9% |
| 1920 | 7,855 | | 19.7% |
| 1930 | 9,953 | | 26.7% |
| 1940 | 12,404 | | 24.6% |
| 1950 | 12,832 | | 3.5% |
| 1960 | 11,160 | | −13.0% |
| 1970 | 10,494 | | −6.0% |
| 1980 | 10,511 | | 0.2% |
| 1990 | 10,770 | | 2.5% |
| 2000 | 12,413 | | 15.3% |
| 2010 | 11,982 | | −3.5% |
| 2020 | 11,539 | | −3.7% |
| 2025 (est.) | 11,087 | ▼ | −3.9% |
U.S. Decennial Census; 1790-1960 1900-1990; 1990-2000 2010-2020

=== 2020 census ===
As of the 2020 census, the county had a population of 11,539. Of the residents, 22.4% were under the age of 18 and 22.8% were 65 years of age or older; the median age was 43.8 years. For every 100 females there were 98.4 males, and for every 100 females age 18 and over there were 97.5 males. 0.0% of residents lived in urban areas and 100.0% lived in rural areas.

Rio Grande County, Colorado – Racial and ethnic composition Note: the US Census treats Hispanic/Latino as an ethnic category. This table excludes Latinos from the racial categories and assigns them to a separate category. Hispanics/Latinos may be of any race.
| Race / Ethnicity (NH = Non-Hispanic) | Pop 2000 | Pop 2010 | Pop 2020 | % 2000 | % 2010 | % 2020 |
|---|---|---|---|---|---|---|
| White alone (NH) | 7,022 | 6,600 | 6,261 | 56.57% | 55.08% | 54.26% |
| Black or African American alone (NH) | 12 | 25 | 51 | 0.10% | 0.21% | 0.44% |
| Native American or Alaska Native alone (NH) | 78 | 104 | 137 | 0.63% | 0.87% | 1.19% |
| Asian alone (NH) | 25 | 40 | 36 | 0.20% | 0.33% | 0.31% |
| Pacific Islander alone (NH) | 0 | 2 | 4 | 0.00% | 0.02% | 0.03% |
| Other race alone (NH) | 12 | 16 | 56 | 0.10% | 0.13% | 0.49% |
| Mixed race or Multiracial (NH) | 92 | 109 | 385 | 0.74% | 0.91% | 3.34% |
| Hispanic or Latino (any race) | 5,172 | 5,086 | 4,609 | 41.67% | 42.45% | 39.94% |
| Total | 12,413 | 11,982 | 11,539 | 100.00% | 100.00% | 100.00% |

The racial makeup of the county was 70.1% White, 0.5% Black or African American, 2.5% American Indian and Alaska Native, 0.4% Asian, 0.1% Native Hawaiian and Pacific Islander, 11.5% from some other race, and 14.9% from two or more races. Hispanic or Latino residents of any race comprised 39.9% of the population.

There were 4,789 households in the county, of which 27.3% had children under the age of 18 living with them and 25.1% had a female householder with no spouse or partner present. About 29.9% of all households were made up of individuals and 14.2% had someone living alone who was 65 years of age or older.

There were 6,527 housing units, of which 26.6% were vacant. Among occupied housing units, 68.8% were owner-occupied and 31.2% were renter-occupied. The homeowner vacancy rate was 2.2% and the rental vacancy rate was 10.9%.

=== 2000 census ===
At the 2000 census there were 12,413 people, 4,701 households, and 3,417 families living in the county. The population density was 14 people per square mile (5.4 people/km^{2}). There were 6,003 housing units at an average density of 7 units per square mile (2.7 units/km^{2}). The racial makeup of the county was 73.93% White, 0.35% Black or African American, 1.26% Native American, 0.23% Asian, 0.02% Pacific Islander, 21.45% from other races, and 2.76% from two or more races. 41.67% of the population were Hispanic or Latino of any race. Of the 4,701 households 35.10% had children under the age of 18 living with them, 57.80% were married couples living together, 11.20% had a female householder with no husband present, and 27.30% were non-families. 24.10% of households were one person and 10.30% were one person aged 65 or older. The average household size was 2.59 and the average family size was 3.08.

The age distribution was 28.10% under the age of 18, 8.00% from 18 to 24, 25.30% from 25 to 44, 23.90% from 45 to 64, and 14.70% 65 or older. The median age was 37 years. For every 100 females there were 97.10 males. For every 100 females age 18 and over, there were 94.40 males.

The median household income was $31,836 and the median family income was $36,809. Males had a median income of $30,432 versus $23,005 for females. The per capita income for the county was $15,650. About 11.30% of families and 14.50% of the population were below the poverty line, including 18.40% of those under age 18 and 11.20% of those age 65 or over.

== Politics ==
Rio Grande County is a Republican stronghold, having not supported a Democrat for president since 1964.

United States presidential election results for Rio Grande County, Colorado
| Year | Republican | | Democratic | | Third party(ies) | |
| Year | No. | % | No. | % | No. | % |
|---|---|---|---|---|---|---|
| 1880 | 298 | 60.08% | 198 | 39.92% | 0 | 0.00% |
| 1884 | 448 | 59.50% | 289 | 38.38% | 16 | 2.12% |
| 1888 | 454 | 61.52% | 261 | 35.37% | 23 | 3.12% |
| 1892 | 539 | 48.82% | 0 | 0.00% | 565 | 51.18% |
| 1896 | 176 | 10.81% | 1,428 | 87.71% | 24 | 1.47% |
| 1900 | 752 | 39.43% | 1,118 | 58.63% | 37 | 1.94% |
| 1904 | 1,417 | 64.97% | 690 | 31.64% | 74 | 3.39% |
| 1908 | 1,122 | 48.51% | 1,139 | 49.24% | 52 | 2.25% |
| 1912 | 698 | 24.98% | 1,286 | 46.03% | 810 | 28.99% |
| 1916 | 886 | 32.61% | 1,756 | 64.63% | 75 | 2.76% |
| 1920 | 1,660 | 61.01% | 985 | 36.20% | 76 | 2.79% |
| 1924 | 1,572 | 53.51% | 922 | 31.38% | 444 | 15.11% |
| 1928 | 2,254 | 64.03% | 1,226 | 34.83% | 40 | 1.14% |
| 1932 | 1,557 | 36.57% | 2,539 | 59.63% | 162 | 3.80% |
| 1936 | 1,884 | 41.64% | 2,574 | 56.90% | 66 | 1.46% |
| 1940 | 3,075 | 57.40% | 2,242 | 41.85% | 40 | 0.75% |
| 1944 | 2,567 | 65.82% | 1,325 | 33.97% | 8 | 0.21% |
| 1948 | 2,049 | 52.86% | 1,814 | 46.80% | 13 | 0.34% |
| 1952 | 3,201 | 70.11% | 1,350 | 29.57% | 15 | 0.33% |
| 1956 | 2,816 | 66.04% | 1,441 | 33.79% | 7 | 0.16% |
| 1960 | 2,524 | 58.53% | 1,782 | 41.33% | 6 | 0.14% |
| 1964 | 1,699 | 43.94% | 2,161 | 55.88% | 7 | 0.18% |
| 1968 | 2,442 | 58.32% | 1,562 | 37.31% | 183 | 4.37% |
| 1972 | 2,787 | 69.69% | 1,029 | 25.73% | 183 | 4.58% |
| 1976 | 2,627 | 62.37% | 1,475 | 35.02% | 110 | 2.61% |
| 1980 | 2,844 | 63.37% | 1,370 | 30.53% | 274 | 6.11% |
| 1984 | 3,122 | 73.25% | 1,104 | 25.90% | 36 | 0.84% |
| 1988 | 2,626 | 62.01% | 1,545 | 36.48% | 64 | 1.51% |
| 1992 | 1,927 | 42.51% | 1,541 | 34.00% | 1,065 | 23.49% |
| 1996 | 2,129 | 49.50% | 1,720 | 39.99% | 452 | 10.51% |
| 2000 | 3,111 | 61.30% | 1,707 | 33.64% | 257 | 5.06% |
| 2004 | 3,448 | 62.40% | 2,006 | 36.30% | 72 | 1.30% |
| 2008 | 2,930 | 53.82% | 2,448 | 44.97% | 66 | 1.21% |
| 2012 | 2,918 | 52.74% | 2,478 | 44.79% | 137 | 2.48% |
| 2016 | 3,085 | 55.75% | 2,001 | 36.16% | 448 | 8.10% |
| 2020 | 3,660 | 58.05% | 2,495 | 39.57% | 150 | 2.38% |
| 2024 | 3,743 | 60.43% | 2,306 | 37.23% | 145 | 2.34% |

United States Senate election results for Rio Grande County, Colorado2
| Year | Republican | | Democratic | | Third party(ies) | |
| Year | No. | % | No. | % | No. | % |
|---|---|---|---|---|---|---|
| 2020 | 3,635 | 57.89% | 2,502 | 39.85% | 142 | 2.26% |

United States Senate election results for Rio Grande County, Colorado3
| Year | Republican | | Democratic | | Third party(ies) | |
| Year | No. | % | No. | % | No. | % |
|---|---|---|---|---|---|---|
| 2022 | 2,625 | 53.09% | 2,136 | 43.20% | 183 | 3.70% |

Colorado Gubernatorial election results for Rio Grande County
| Year | Republican | | Democratic | | Third party(ies) | |
| Year | No. | % | No. | % | No. | % |
|---|---|---|---|---|---|---|
| 2022 | 2,485 | 50.15% | 2,140 | 43.19% | 330 | 6.66% |

== Communities ==
=== City ===
- Monte Vista

=== Towns ===
- Center (mostly in Saguache County)
- Del Norte
- South Fork

=== Census-designated places ===
- Alpine
- Gerrard

=== Unincorporated ===
- Homelake

== See also ==
- Bibliography of Colorado
- Geography of Colorado
- History of Colorado
  - National Register of Historic Places listings in Rio Grande County, Colorado
- Index of Colorado-related articles
- List of Colorado-related lists
  - List of counties in Colorado
- Outline of Colorado
