= Capulin, Colorado =

Census-designated place in Conejos County, CO, USA

- Census-designated place
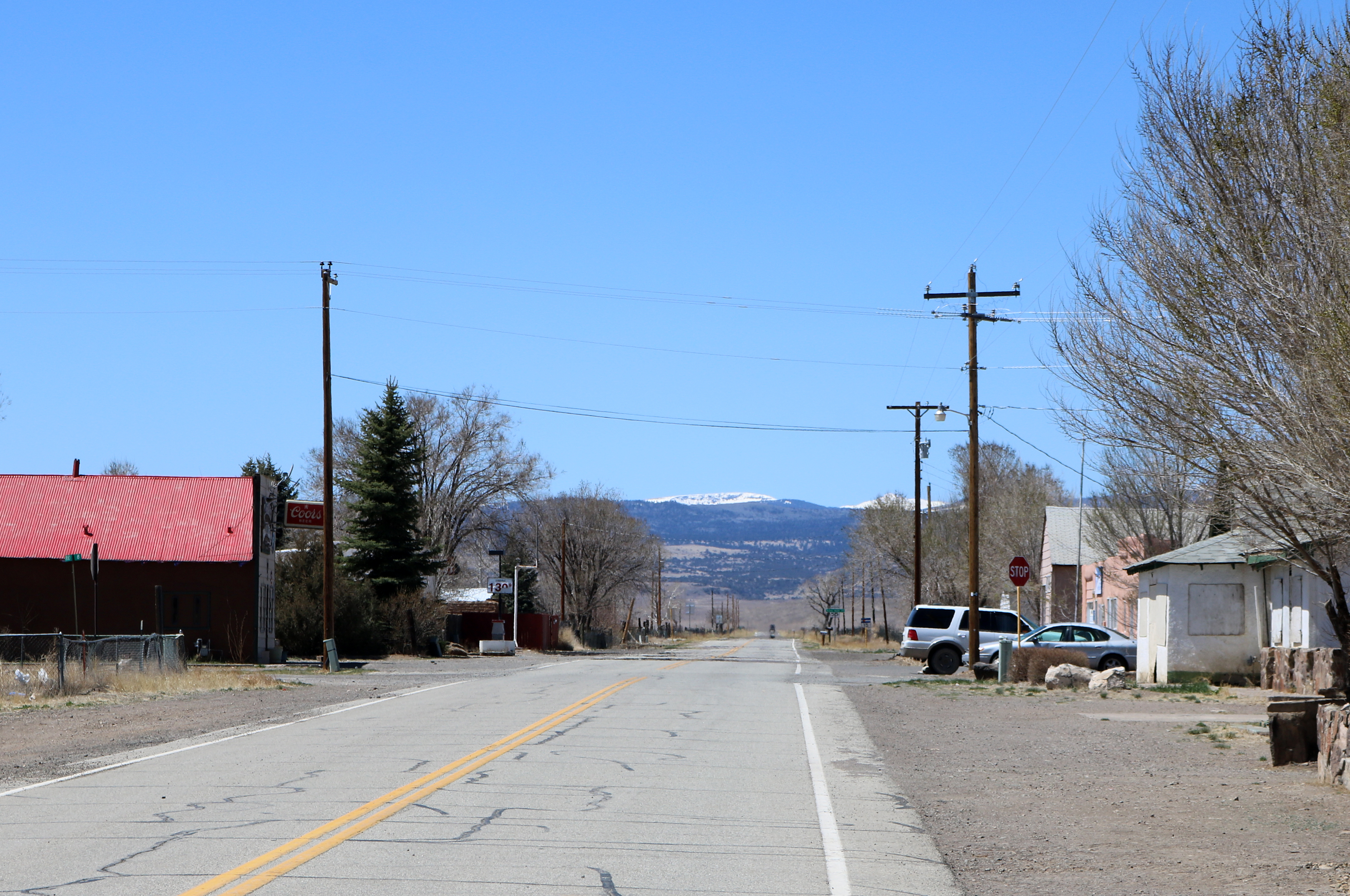
- Looking west on Colorado State Highway 15 in Capulin.

- Location of Capulin, Colorado. Capulin (Colorado)
- Coordinates: 37.2839°N 106.1114°W
- Country: United States
- State: Colorado
- County: Conejos
- Established: 1867

Government
  - Type: unincorporated community
  - Body: Conejos County

Area
  - Total: 0.947 sq mi (2.453 km^{2})
  - Land: 0.947 sq mi (2.453 km^{2})
  - Water: 0 sq mi (0.000 km^{2})
- Elevation: 7,822 ft (2,384 m)

Population (2020)
  - Total: 134
  - Density: 141/sq mi (54.6/km^{2})
- Time zone: UTC−07:00 (MST)
  - Summer (DST): UTC−06:00 (MDT)
- ZIP code: 81124 (PO Box)
- Area code: 719
- GNIS pop ID: 190796
- GNIS CDP ID: 2583218
- FIPS code: 08-11975 website =

Capulin is an unincorporated community, a post office, and a census-designated place (CDP) located in Conejos County, Colorado, United States. The Capulin post office has the ZIP Code 81124. At the United States Census 2020, the population of the Capulin CDP was 134.

== History ==
The town of Capulin was established by settlers from Ojo Caliente, New Mexico, in 1867. "Capulin" is a regional word for chokecherry. The Capulin, Colorado, post office opened on August 10, 1881.

== Geography ==
Capulin is located in northern Conejos County. Colorado State Highway 15 leads east 8 miles (13 km) to U.S. Route 285, just north of La Jara, and west then north 22 miles (35 km) to Monte Vista.

The Capulin CDP has an area of 606 acres (2.453 km^{2}), all land.

== Demographics ==
The United States Census Bureau initially defined the Capulin CDP for the United States Census 2010.

Capulin CDP, Colorado
Year	Pop.	±%
2010	200	—
2020	134	−33.0%
Source: United States Census Bureau

== Notable residents ==
- Eppie Archuleta, master weaver and 1985 recipient of the National Heritage Fellowship

== See also ==
- List of census-designated places in Colorado
- List of populated places in Colorado
- List of post offices in Colorado
