= Monte Vista National Wildlife Refuge =

Protected area in southern Colorado, USA

- IUCN category IV (habitat/species management area)
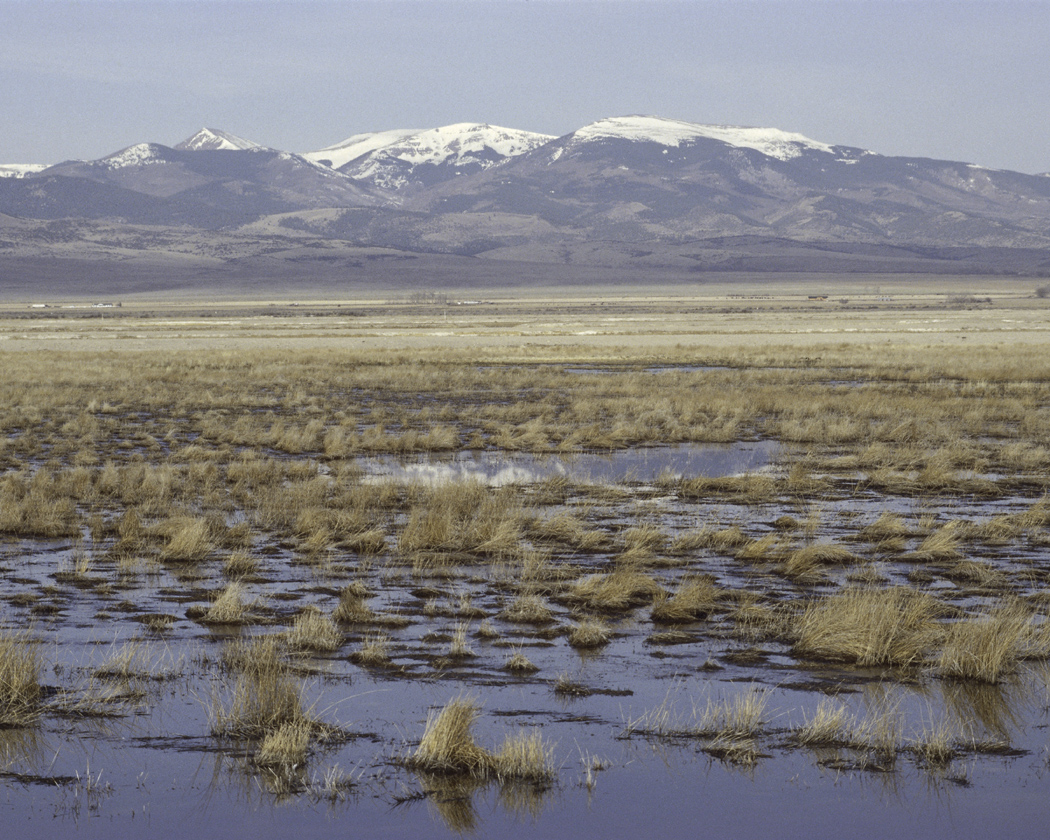

- Location within the United States
- Location: Rio Grande County, Colorado, United States
- Nearest city: Monte Vista, Colorado
- Coordinates: 37°29′0″N 106°5′30″W
- Area: 14,800 acres (60 km^{2})
- Established: 1953
- Governing body: U.S. Fish and Wildlife Service
- Website: Monte Vista National Wildlife Refuge

Monte Vista National Wildlife Refuge is a United States National Wildlife Refuge located in southern Colorado. The refuge is located in the San Luis Valley south of the town of Monte Vista, Colorado in southeastern Rio Grande County, Colorado, in the watershed of the Rio Grande. It was established in 1953 by the Migratory Bird Conservation Commission to provide a habitat for wildlife, particularly waterfowl, in the San Luis Valley.

== Description and history ==
The site was historically an agricultural area and thus water is intensively managed on the refuge, especially in comparison to the nearby Alamosa refuge. Irrigation includes numerous dikes and other water control structures that provide water to a patchwork of diverse wetland habitats ranging from shallow wet meadows to open water. The refuge includes Artesian wells, pumped wells and irrigation canals, some dating to the "ditch boom" of the 1880s. The refuge is a major stopover for migrating greater sandhill cranes moving between their wintering area around Bosque del Apache National Wildlife Refuge in New Mexico and breeding grounds in the northern United States and southern Canada. Up to 20,000 cranes pass through in the spring and again in the fall. Three remaining endangered whooping cranes from a failed attempt to establish a wild migratory population in the 1980s can be seen migrating with their foster species, the sandhill crane. Beginning in the 1980s, a herd of elk began using the refuge. At present, several hundred elk may be seen on the refuge seeking winter food and sanctuary from hunting pressure on nearby public lands.

== Climate ==
Waverly is roughly 5 miles southeast of Monte Vista National Wildlife Refuge. Waverly has a cold desert climate (Köppen BWk), closely bordering on a cold semi-arid climate (Köppen BSk).

Climate data for Waverly, Colorado, 1991–2020 normals: 7603ft (2317m)
Month	Jan	Feb	Mar	Apr	May	Jun	Jul	Aug	Sep	Oct	Nov	Dec	Year
Record high °F (°C)	58 (14)	61 (16)	72 (22)	76 (24)	86 (30)	90 (32)	96 (36)	86 (30)	85 (29)	79 (26)	68 (20)	62 (17)	96 (36)
Mean maximum °F (°C)	47 (8)	52 (11)	67 (19)	72 (22)	78 (26)	86 (30)	86 (30)	83 (28)	81 (27)	74 (23)	64 (18)	53 (12)	88 (31)
Mean daily maximum °F (°C)	33.7 (0.9)	39.1 (3.9)	51.1 (10.6)	59.4 (15.2)	67.0 (19.4)	76.6 (24.8)	79.1 (26.2)	77.1 (25.1)	71.8 (22.1)	61.6 (16.4)	48.2 (9.0)	35.0 (1.7)	58.3 (14.6)
Daily mean °F (°C)	15.2 (−9.3)	21.7 (−5.7)	33.1 (0.6)	41.1 (5.1)	49.7 (9.8)	58.1 (14.5)	62.4 (16.9)	60.5 (15.8)	53.9 (12.2)	42.7 (5.9)	29.6 (−1.3)	17.0 (−8.3)	40.4 (4.7)
Mean daily minimum °F (°C)	−3.2 (−19.6)	4.3 (−15.4)	15.1 (−9.4)	22.8 (−5.1)	32.3 (0.2)	39.6 (4.2)	45.7 (7.6)	43.9 (6.6)	36.0 (2.2)	23.8 (−4.6)	11.0 (−11.7)	−1.1 (−18.4)	22.5 (−5.3)
Mean minimum °F (°C)	−22 (−30)	−13 (−25)	0 (−18)	9 (−13)	19 (−7)	30 (−1)	39 (4)	36 (2)	26 (−3)	10 (−12)	−5 (−21)	−18 (−28)	−26 (−32)
Record low °F (°C)	−40 (−40)	−33 (−36)	−11 (−24)	−1 (−18)	6 (−14)	18 (−8)	33 (1)	29 (−2)	20 (−7)	−6 (−21)	−23 (−31)	−34 (−37)	−40 (−40)
Average precipitation inches (mm)	0.49 (12)	0.28 (7.1)	0.50 (13)	0.66 (17)	0.71 (18)	0.43 (11)	1.09 (28)	1.27 (32)	1.04 (26)	0.67 (17)	0.37 (9.4)	0.39 (9.9)	7.9 (200.4)
Average snowfall inches (cm)	7.10 (18.0)	4.00 (10.2)	4.70 (11.9)	5.50 (14.0)	0.80 (2.0)	0.00 (0.00)	0.00 (0.00)	0.00 (0.00)	0.00 (0.00)	1.70 (4.3)	3.30 (8.4)	5.10 (13.0)	32.2 (81.8)
Source 1: NOAA
Source 2: XMACIS (records & monthly max/mins)
