= Conejos County, Colorado =

County in Colorado, United States

- County
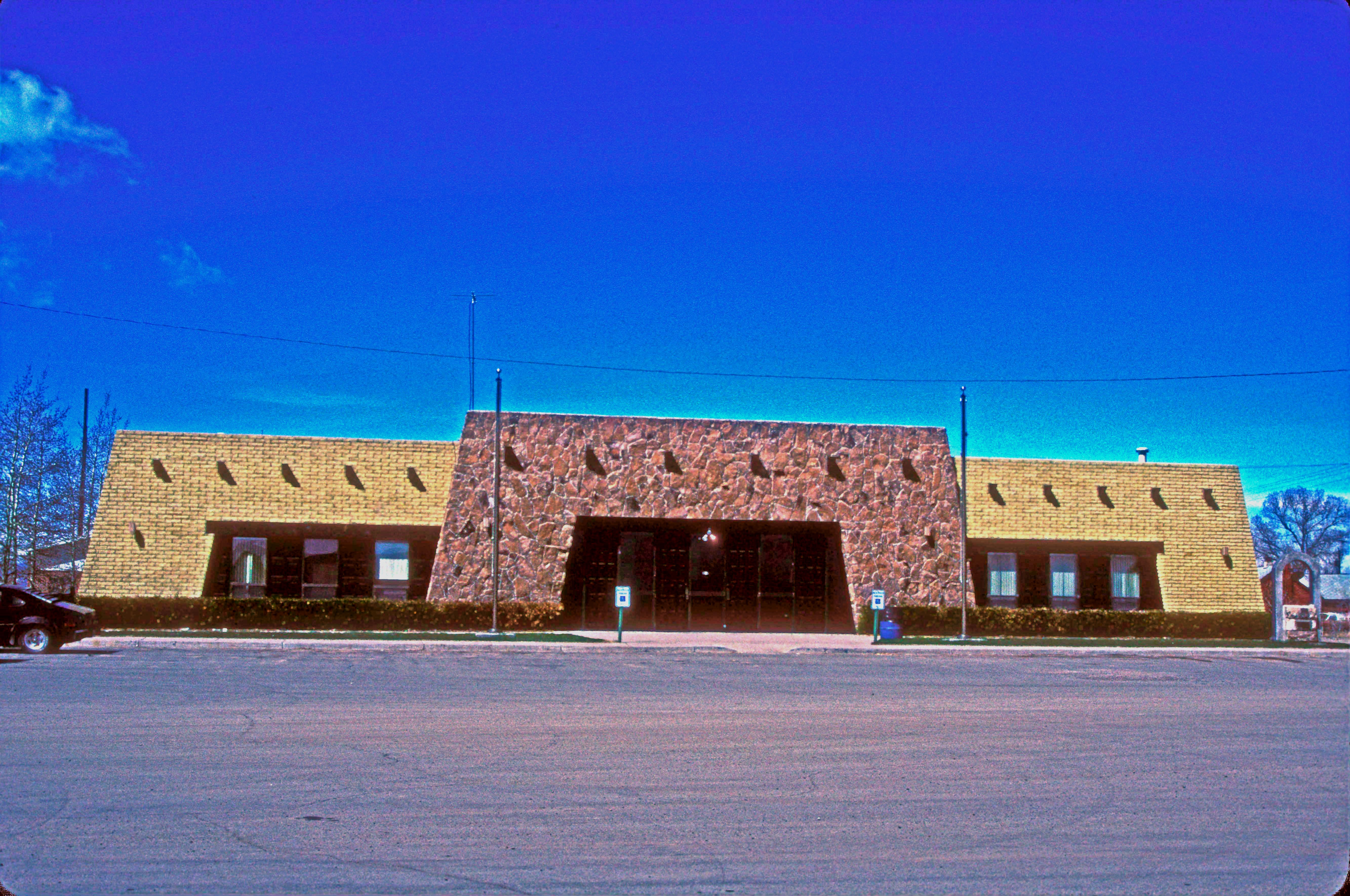
- Conejos County Courthouse

- Location within the U.S. state of Colorado
- Coordinates: 37.21°N 106.19°W
- Country: United States
- State: Colorado
- Founded: November 1, 1861
- Named for: Conejos River
- Seat: Conejos
- Largest town: Manassa

Area
  - Total: 1,291 sq mi (3,340 km^{2})
  - Land: 1,287 sq mi (3,330 km^{2})
  - Water: 3.6 sq mi (9.3 km^{2}) 0.3%

Population (2020)
  - Total: 7,461
  - Estimate (2025): 7,529 ▲
  - Density: 6/sq mi (2.3/km^{2})
- Time zone: UTC−7 (Mountain)
  - Summer (DST): UTC−6 (MDT)
- Congressional district: 3rd
- Website: conejoscounty.colorado.gov

Conejos County (Spanish for "rabbits") is a county located in the U.S. state of Colorado. As of the 2020 census, the population was 7,461. The county seat is the unincorporated community of Conejos. Being 50.7% Hispanic in 2020, Conejos was Colorado's largest Hispanic-majority county.

== History ==
The first European known to visit this area was Juan de Oñate y Salazar in 1550 followed by Don Diego de Vargas in 1694, but he left behind no colonists. In 1708, Juan de Uribarri passed through searching for run-away Indian slaves.

Conejos County was one of the original 17 counties created by the General Assembly of the Territory of Colorado on 1851-11-01. Conejos County was originally named Guadalupe County but was renamed Conejos County a week later on November 7. Its name comes from the Spanish word "conejo", meaning rabbit, for the abundance of rabbits in the area. Also early in its existence, the county seat was moved from the town of Guadalupe to Conejos. The original boundaries of the county included a large portion of southwestern Colorado.

In 1874, most of the western and northern portions of the county were broken away to form parts of Hinsdale, La Plata and Rio Grande counties, and Conejos County achieved its modern borders in 1885 when its western half was taken to create Archuleta County.

=== Religious history ===
The community of Conejos is the location of the oldest extant church house in Colorado, constructed in 1856 and named "Our Lady of Guadalupe Parish". The first settlers into the area were from New Mexico, primarily from Abiquiu, San Juan de los Caballeros and Santa Cruz. As more people arrived, mission churches were set up and all had the records housed in Our Lady of Guadalupe Parish.

When Antonito was built, the Theatines, priests from Spain, came into the area and built St. Augustine church in 1880 within Antonito. The church records from Our Lady of Guadalupe Parish are now housed at the church offices of Saint Augustine. Conejos is approximately a mile northwest of Antonito.

Presbyterians came into Conejos County in 1880 establishing churches in Antonito, Alamosa, Cenicero, Del Norte, Mogote, San Rafael, and Monte Vista. They also established schools in the area and had a large number of Hispanic converts. A jacal went up in 1854 in Guadalupe, now known as Conejos, which was the beginning of Our Lady of Guadalupe Parish.

There is also a large Mormon population within Conejos County. Settlers belonging to the Church of Jesus Christ of Latter-day Saints (LDS Church) began settling in the towns of La Jara, Manassa and Sanford; each town currently has an LDS meetinghouse. Fox Creek, a village approximately 11 miles west of Antonito, is the newest community to have an LDS meetinghouse erected, although there had previously been a meetinghouse there. Fox Creek, however, does not have a predominantly Mormon population.

=== Genealogy ===
Records available for this area are marriage records, which are held by the county clerk. Divorce records are maintained by the clerk of the district court. Agencies that hold records for marriages and divorces from 1900 to 1939 are the Colorado State Archives and Denver Public Library Genealogy Department. Other records available are marriage records from 1871 and death records from 1877 to 1907. This also include land records from 1871, probate records from 1875, and court records from 1877. However, some records were lost due to a fire, but birth records for 1877-1907 are still preserved. Websites that will be of use when doing genealogical research are The Colorado Genealogical Society and Conejos County WW II Enlistments.

== Geography ==
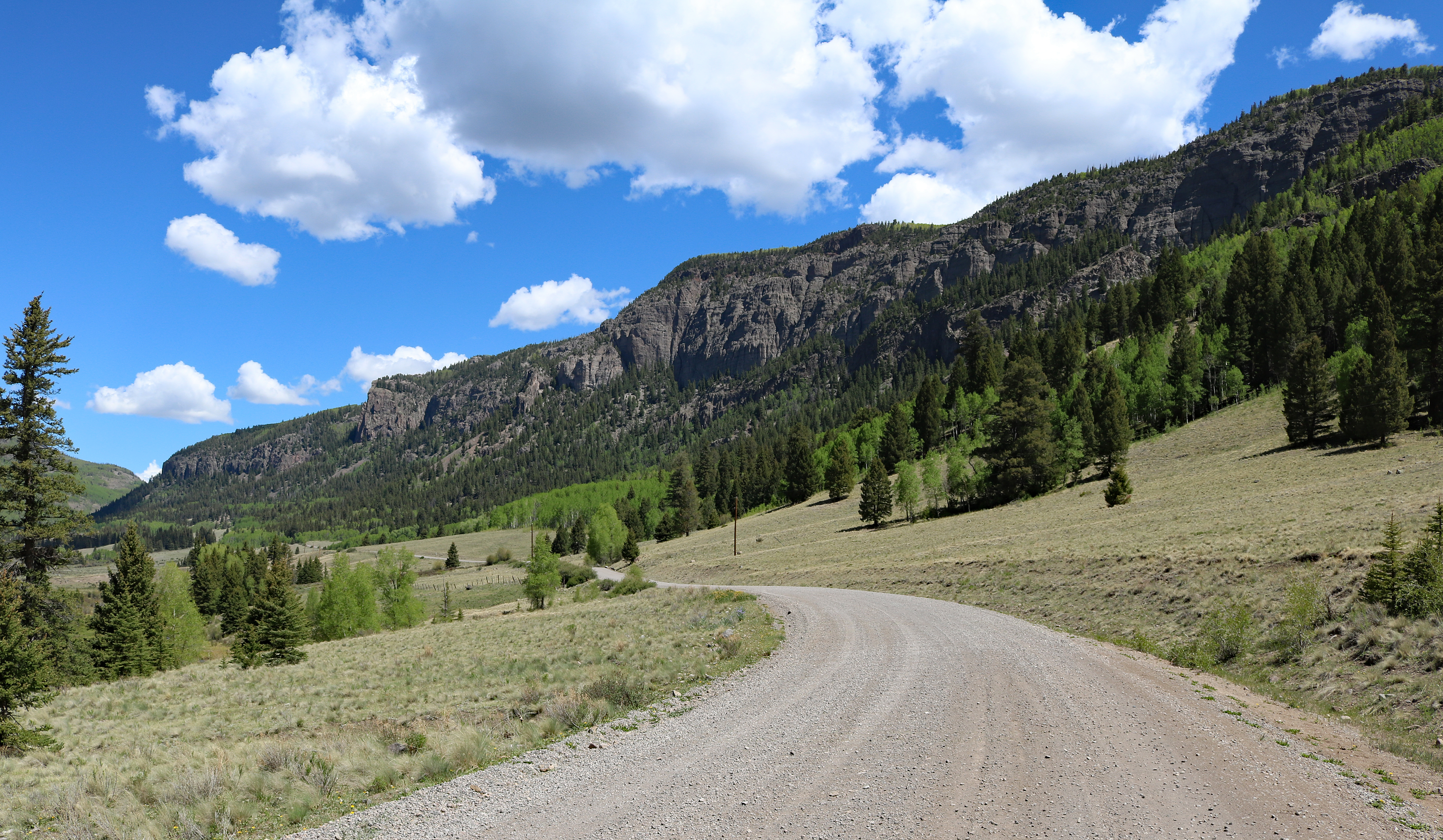
The area known as The Pinnacles along Forest Road 250 in the upper Conejos River Valley

According to the U.S. Census Bureau, the county has a total area of 1,291 square miles (3,340 km^{2}), of which 1,287 square miles (3,330 km^{2}) is land and 3.6 square miles (9.3 km^{2}) (0.3%) is water.

Conejos County is in a broad high mountain valley in South Central Colorado. It has an area of approximately 825,446 acres (3,340 km^{2}) in 1,290 square miles (3,340 km^{2}). Roughly half the area is on the nearly level floor of the valley, where the average elevation is about 7,700 feet (2,350 m). The western half of the county ranges from gently rolling to steep foothills with mountains that rise in elevation to about 13,000 feet (4,000 m).

Conejos County is situated with the National Forest to the west and the Rio Grande to the east, along Colorado's southern border with the state of New Mexico. Only about 34 percent of Conejos County is privately owned with the other 66 percent being National Forest, Bureau of Land Management (BLM) or State owned lands.

=== Climate ===
In winter, the average temperature is 21.6 degrees Fahrenheit, and the average daily minimum temperature is 4 degrees. In summer, the average temperature is 61.4 degrees, and the average maximum temperature is 79.6 degrees.

Seventy-one percent of the annual precipitation falls in the months of April through September. Average seasonal snowfall is 28 inches. The average relative humidity in mid-afternoon in spring is less than 35 percent; during the rest of the year, it is about 45 percent. The percentage of possible sunshine is 77 in the summer and 73 in the winter.

=== Adjacent counties ===
- Rio Grande County - north
- Alamosa County - northeast
- Costilla County - east
- Taos County, New Mexico - southeast
- Rio Arriba County, New Mexico - south
- Archuleta County- west

=== Major highways ===
- U.S. Highway 285
- State Highway 15
- State Highway 17
- State Highway 136
- State Highway 142
- State Highway 368
- State Highway 371

=== National protected areas ===
- Rio Grande National Forest
- San Juan National Forest
- South San Juan Wilderness
- Rio Grande Natural Area

=== Historic trails and sites ===
- Old Spanish National Historic Trail
- Pike's Stockade, which is a National Historic Landmark

=== Scenic trails and byways ===
- Continental Divide National Scenic Trail
- Los Caminos Antiguos Scenic & Historic Byway

== Demographics ==
Historical population
Census	Pop.	Note	%±
1870	2,504		—
1880	5,605		123.8%
1890	7,193		28.3%
1900	8,794		22.3%
1910	11,285		28.3%
1920	8,416		−25.4%
1930	9,803		16.5%
1940	11,648		18.8%
1950	10,171		−12.7%
1960	8,428		−17.1%
1970	7,846		−6.9%
1980	7,794		−0.7%
1990	7,453		−4.4%
2000	8,400		12.7%
2010	8,256		−1.7%
2020	7,461		−9.6%
2025 (est.)	7,529	▲	0.9%
U.S. Decennial Census; 1790-1960 1900-1990; 1990-2000 2010-2020 2025

=== 2020 census ===
As of the 2020 census, the county had a population of 7,461. Of the residents, 26.1% were under the age of 18 and 21.6% were 65 years of age or older; the median age was 41.0 years. For every 100 females there were 99.8 males, and for every 100 females age 18 and over there were 99.8 males. 0.0% of residents lived in urban areas and 100.0% lived in rural areas.

Conejos County, Colorado – Racial and ethnic composition Note: the US Census treats Hispanic/Latino as an ethnic category. This table excludes Latinos from the racial categories and assigns them to a separate category. Hispanics/Latinos may be of any race.
Race / Ethnicity (NH = Non-Hispanic)	Pop 2000	Pop 2010	Pop 2020	% 2000	% 2010	% 2020
White alone (NH)	3,298	3,451	3,465	39.26%	41.80%	46.44%
Black or African American alone (NH)	9	12	14	0.11%	0.15%	0.19%
Native American or Alaska Native alone (NH)	61	47	44	0.73%	0.57%	0.59%
Asian alone (NH)	8	18	21	0.10%	0.22%	0.28%
Pacific Islander alone (NH)	5	4	2	0.06%	0.05%	0.03%
Other race alone (NH)	8	24	24	0.10%	0.29%	0.32%
Mixed race or Multiracial (NH)	62	80	112	0.74%	0.97%	1.50%
Hispanic or Latino (any race)	4,949	4,620	3,779	58.92%	55.96%	50.65%
Total	8,400	8,256	7,461	100.00%	100.00%	100.00%

The racial makeup of the county was 67.6% White, 0.4% Black or African American, 2.2% American Indian and Alaska Native, 0.3% Asian, 0.0% Native Hawaiian and Pacific Islander, 14.2% from some other race, and 15.3% from two or more races. Hispanic or Latino residents of any race comprised 50.7% of the population.

There were 2,896 households in the county, of which 30.3% had children under the age of 18 living with them and 24.4% had a female householder with no spouse or partner present. About 29.3% of all households were made up of individuals and 15.4% had someone living alone who was 65 years of age or older.

There were 3,998 housing units, of which 27.6% were vacant. Among occupied housing units, 77.2% were owner-occupied and 22.8% were renter-occupied. The homeowner vacancy rate was 1.8% and the rental vacancy rate was 17.8%.

=== 2000 census ===
As of the 2000 census, there were 8,400 people, 2,980 households, and 2,211 families residing in the county. The population density was 6 people per square mile (2.3 people/km^{2}). There were 3,886 housing units at an average density of 3 units per square mile (1.2 units/km^{2}). The racial makeup of the county was 72.76% White, 0.21% Black or African American, 1.69% Native American, 0.15% Asian, 0.07% Pacific Islander, 21.50% from other races, and 3.61% from two or more races. 58.92% of the population were Hispanic or Latino of any race.

There were 2,980 households, out of which 38.50% had children under the age of 18 living with them, 56.30% were married couples living together, 12.70% had a female householder with no husband present, and 25.80% were non-families. 23.70% of all households were made up of individuals, and 11.50% had someone living alone who was 65 years of age or older. The average household size was 2.80 and the average family size was 3.33.

In the county, the population was spread out, with 32.10% under the age of 18, 8.50% from 18 to 24, 23.60% from 25 to 44, 20.80% from 45 to 64, and 15.00% who were 65 years of age or older. The median age was 34 years. For every 100 females there were 98.50 males. For every 100 females age 18 and over, there were 98.10 males.

The median income for a household in the county was $24,744, and the median income for a family was $29,066. Males had a median income of $26,351 versus $20,200 for females. The per capita income for the county was $12,050. About 18.60% of families and 23.00% of the population were below the poverty line, including 28.20% of those under age 18 and 17.30% of those age 65 or over.

== Politics ==
Conejos County had a reputation as a bellwether county (Only voting for the losing party candidate in 1928, 1968, 1988 and 2004 since 1900). Over the past 10 years, Conejos has trended to the right, becoming a consistently Republican County, in contrast to the state itself which has been trending to the left since 2004.

Donald Trump flipped the county in 2016, held it even in his loss against Biden in 2020, and won it by 18 points in 2024, the strongest Republican showing in Conejos County since 1920. In 2022, despite both Governor Jared Polis and U.S. Senator Micheal Bennet easily winning re-election by large margins, Conejos voted against both of them (even flipping to support Bennet’s opponent Joe O’Dea after Bennet had won the county in 2016).

United States presidential election results for Conejos County, Colorado
Year	Republican		Democratic		Third party(ies)	
Year	No.	%	No.	%	No.	%
1880	608	49.80%	611	50.04%	2	0.16%
1884	728	55.45%	583	44.40%	2	0.15%
1888	982	59.26%	669	40.37%	6	0.36%
1892	823	56.88%	0	0.00%	624	43.12%
1896	96	3.86%	2,388	95.98%	4	0.16%
1900	1,853	66.87%	912	32.91%	6	0.22%
1904	2,018	68.55%	901	30.60%	25	0.85%
1908	1,736	56.09%	1,335	43.13%	24	0.78%
1912	1,587	34.36%	2,147	46.48%	885	19.16%
1916	928	34.74%	1,721	64.43%	22	0.82%
1920	1,595	63.50%	886	35.27%	31	1.23%
1924	1,475	56.17%	995	37.89%	156	5.94%
1928	1,463	45.24%	1,692	52.32%	79	2.44%
1932	1,190	30.90%	2,641	68.58%	20	0.52%
1936	1,305	35.18%	2,347	63.26%	58	1.56%
1940	2,028	44.81%	2,481	54.82%	17	0.38%
1944	1,740	46.18%	2,028	53.82%	0	0.00%
1948	1,532	40.03%	2,236	58.43%	59	1.54%
1952	2,194	56.23%	1,610	41.26%	98	2.51%
1956	1,884	55.89%	1,471	43.64%	16	0.47%
1960	1,367	38.80%	2,069	58.73%	87	2.47%
1964	1,031	33.52%	2,033	66.09%	12	0.39%
1968	1,361	45.67%	1,492	50.07%	127	4.26%
1972	1,658	55.51%	1,140	38.17%	189	6.33%
1976	1,426	44.65%	1,698	53.16%	70	2.19%
1980	1,597	49.41%	1,503	46.50%	132	4.08%
1984	1,669	51.40%	1,553	47.83%	25	0.77%
1988	1,445	41.92%	1,976	57.33%	26	0.75%
1992	1,160	33.48%	1,705	49.21%	600	17.32%
1996	1,149	36.06%	1,726	54.17%	311	9.76%
2000	1,772	48.27%	1,749	47.64%	150	4.09%
2004	1,864	49.01%	1,894	49.80%	45	1.18%
2008	1,653	42.67%	2,154	55.60%	67	1.73%
2012	1,835	44.75%	2,213	53.96%	53	1.29%
2016	1,914	47.59%	1,771	44.03%	337	8.38%
2020	2,286	52.76%	1,959	45.21%	88	2.03%
2024	2,358	57.44%	1,627	39.63%	120	2.92%

United States Senate election results for Conejos County, Colorado2
Year	Republican		Democratic		Third party(ies)	
Year	No.	%	No.	%	No.	%
2020	1,975	46.26%	2,243	52.54%	51	1.19%

United States Senate election results for Conejos County, Colorado3
Year	Republican		Democratic		Third party(ies)	
Year	No.	%	No.	%	No.	%
2022	1,704	49.43%	1,669	48.42%	74	2.15%

Colorado Gubernatorial election results for Conejos County
Year	Republican		Democratic		Third party(ies)	
Year	No.	%	No.	%	No.	%
2022	1,702	49.33%	1,659	48.09%	89	2.58%

== Communities ==
=== Towns ===
- Antonito
- La Jara
- Manassa
- Romeo
- Sanford

=== Census-designated places ===
- Capulin
- Conejos

=== Other communities ===
- Bear Creek
- Bountiful
- Cañon
- Carmel
- Cenicero a.k.a. Lobatos
- Elk Creek
- Fox Creek
- Guadalupe
- Horca
- La Florida
- La Isla
- Los Sauses a.k.a. Lasauses, Colorado
- Las Mesitas
- Mogote
- Ortiz
- Osier
- Platoro
- Richfield
- Rincones
- San Antonio
- Sheep Creek

== Notable people ==
- Fred Haberlein - Muralist
- Jack Dempsey - Boxer born in Manassa, Colorado

== See also ==
- Bibliography of Colorado
- Geography of Colorado
- History of Colorado
  - Guadalupe County, Colorado Territory
  - National Register of Historic Places listings in Conejos County, Colorado
- Index of Colorado-related articles
- List of Colorado-related lists
  - List of counties in Colorado
- Outline of Colorado
