= Waverly, Colorado =

Unincorporated community in Larimer County, CO, USA

Coordinates: 40°44′11″N 105°04′36″W

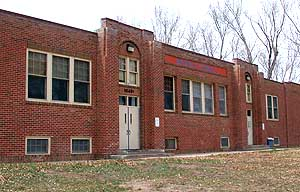
Waverly School front exterior. The school was built in 1918 and served as K-12 school until 1960, when it was merged with the Poudre School District. It was closed in 1992 and was used as a youth center by the school district until 2004

Waverly is a small unincorporated community in rural eastern Larimer County, Colorado, United States.

== Description ==
Waverly is primarily an agricultural community, consisting of a group of houses along County Road 15 surrounded by ranchlands north of Fort Collins and west of Wellington. The only public buildings in town are a fire station of the Wellington Fire District, as well as the Waverly School, a former schoolhouse. The community has gained local notoriety in recent years because of recent subdivision growth along County Road 15, as well as by efforts of local citizens to manage growth and repel possible annexation attempts.

== History ==
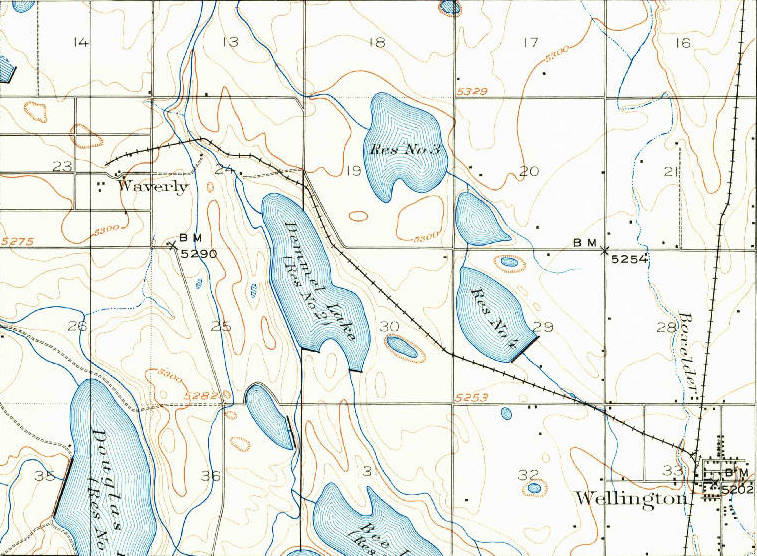
The town and vicinity in 1906

The area around the community was settled in the 1880s, with ranching and sugar beet cultivation as the primary industries. In 1903, the town was platted by F.C. Grable and promoted by his brother Sherman. It was named "Waverly" after the Walter Scott novels by a post clerk in the early 20th century. Most of the platted development did not occur, however, and the town remained very small in size. In the early 20th century, it was incorporated for a time as the Town of Waverly and governed by a board of trustees. At its height, the town had several stores, a church, and post office, as well as the school, built in 1918. The girls basketball team won state championships in 1939 and 1940. In 1960, the school district was consolidated with the larger nearby Poudre School District, and the school became an elementary school. The elementary school was closed in 1992, and for the next 12 years, the building was used as a teen program center by the school district. In 2004, the school district moved the programs to Fort Collins and the building was sold to a private non-profit organization. Most recently, the building serves as an alternative teen learning center by Turning Point, the meeting place for the Ridin' for the Brand Cowboy Church, and occasionally as a community hall.

The Waverly community today consists of rural homes and ranches located around County Road 15. In the 1990s, the rapid growth of Fort Collins and Wellington began to encroach on the area with the development of several upscale ranchette subdivisions along County Road 15, as well as growth spreading from nearby Wellington. The new development prompted community efforts to manage growth. In 2001, the Waverly Community Group was formed in response to a proposal by Fort Collins to build a highway bypass south of Waverly. In 2002, the group effectively lobbied the Board of Trustees of the Town of Wellington to adjust its growth plan to avoid the eventual annexation of Waverly. In 2004, the group was designated as the managers of an "area of concern" by the Larimer County Board of Commissioners, who would be notified and consulted regarded any county ordinances or growth plans in the area.

== Geography ==
The Waverly community in general is bounded as follows: on the north by County Road 72, on the east by County Road 11, on the west by County Road 21, and on the south by County Road 64.
