= Estrella, Colorado =

Unincorporated community in Alamosa County, Colorado, United States

- Unincorporated community
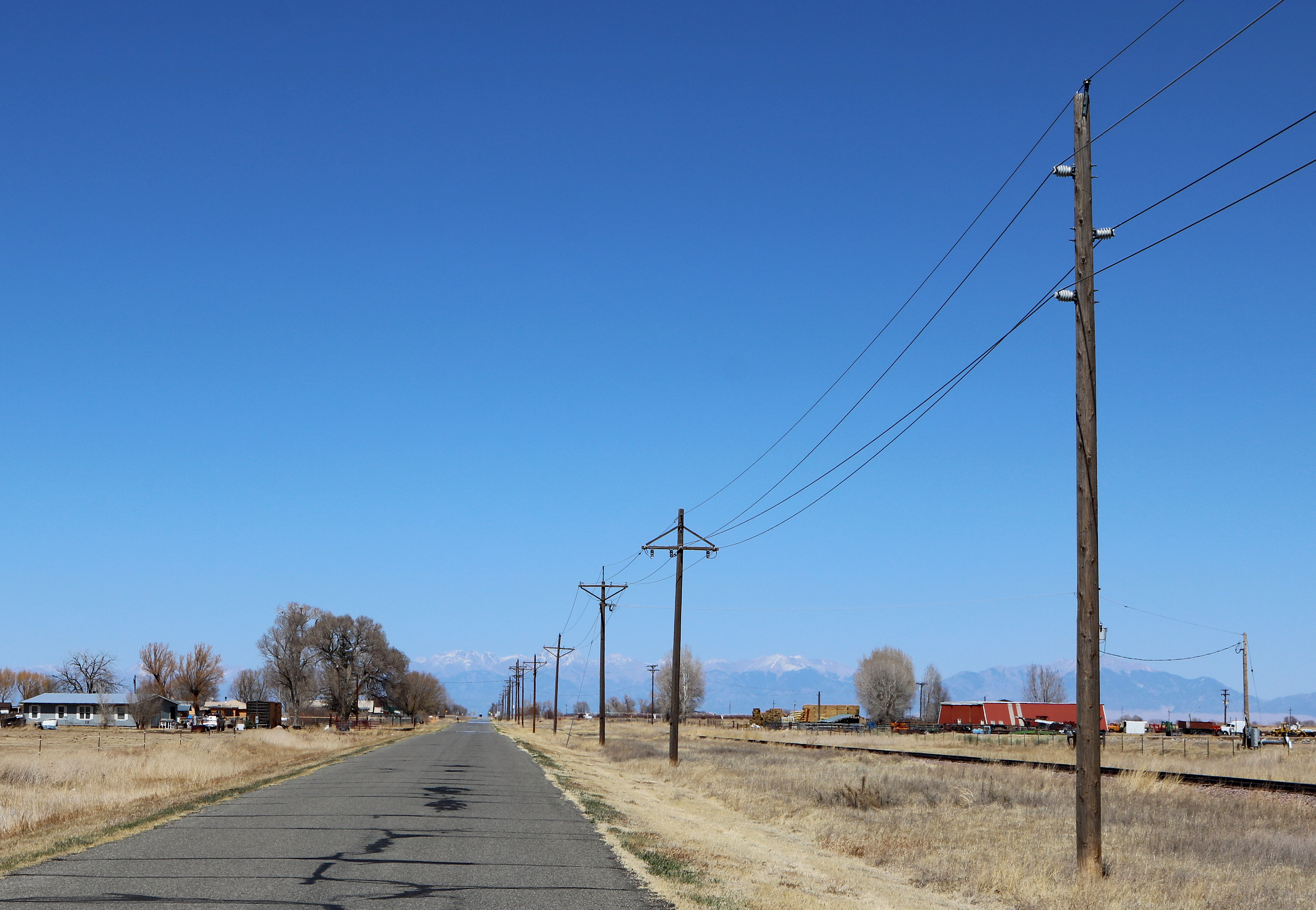
- Looking northwest on Estrella Road in Estrella, April 2018.

- Location of Estrella, Colorado. Estrella (Colorado)
- Coordinates: 37°21′58″N 105°55′28″W
- Country: United States
- State: Colorado
- County: Alamosa

Government
  - Type: Unincorporated community
  - Body: Alamosa County
- Elevation: 7,569 ft (2,307 m)
- Time zone: UTC−07:00 (MST)
  - Summer (DST): UTC−06:00 (MDT)
- ZIP code: Alamosa 81101
- Area code: 719
- GNIS place ID: 192916

Estrella is an unincorporated community in southern Alamosa County, Colorado, United States. The community is a part of the Alamosa, CO Micropolitan Statistical Area.

== History ==
Estrella is a name derived from Spanish meaning "star". The unincorporated community has never had its own post office. The Alamosa, Colorado, post office (ZIP code 81101) serves the area.

== Geography ==
Estrella is located in southern Alamosa County.

== See also ==
- Alamosa, CO Micropolitan Statistical Area
- List of populated places in Colorado
