= Monte Vista, Colorado =

City in Rio Grande County, Colorado, United States

- Home rule municipality
- City of Monte Vista
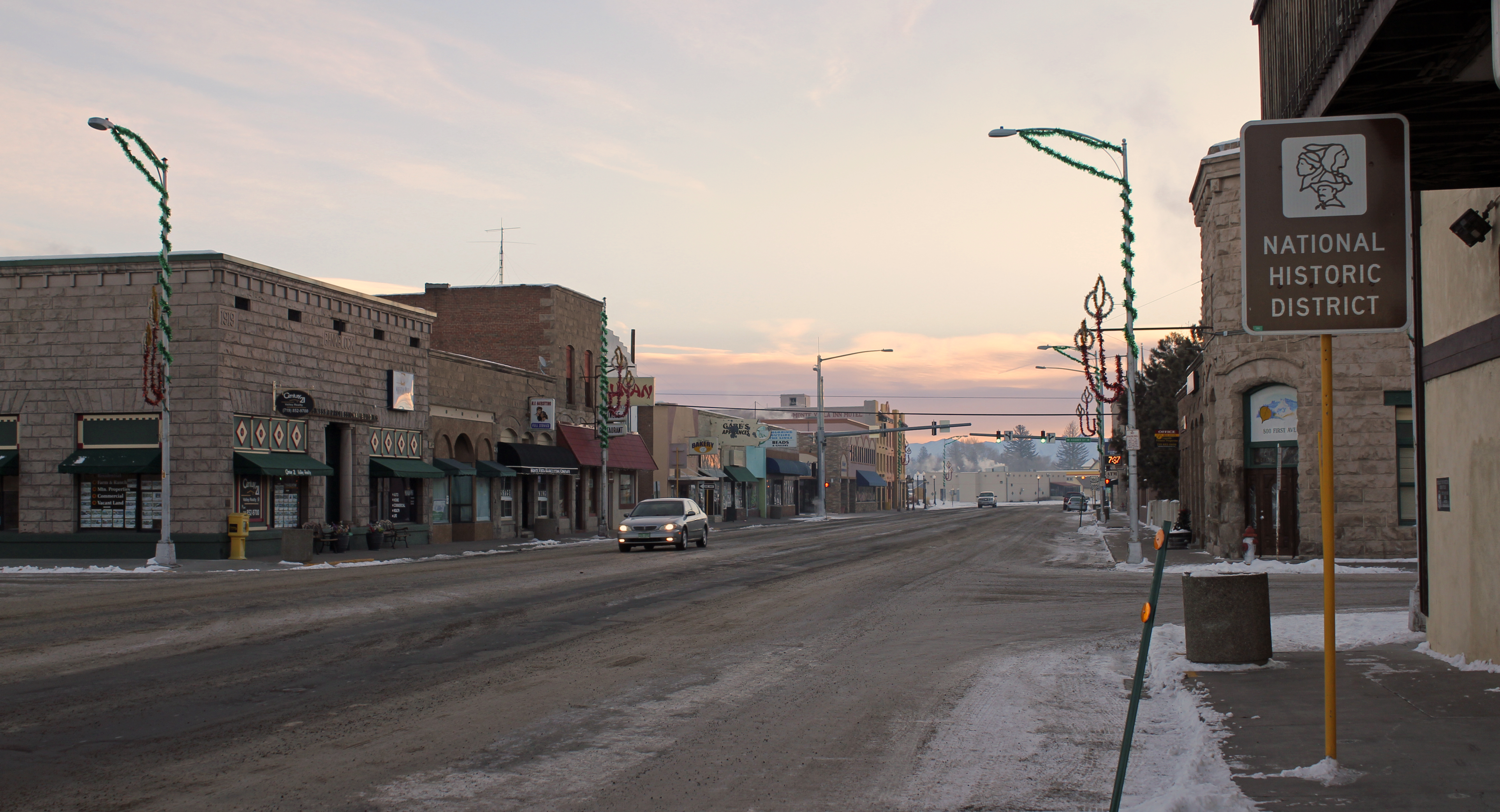
- Downtown Monte Vista in late 2012
- Motto: Experience the Full Monte
- Location of the City of Monte Vista in Rio Grande County, Colorado
- Coordinates: 37°34′41″N 106°08′35″W
- Country: United States
- State: Colorado
- County: Rio Grande County
- Incorporated: September 27, 1886

Government
  - Type: Home rule municipality

Area
  - Total: 2.65 sq mi (6.87 km^{2})
  - Land: 2.63 sq mi (6.82 km^{2})
  - Water: 0.019 sq mi (0.05 km^{2})
- Elevation: 7,664 ft (2,336 m)

Population (2020)
  - Total: 4,247
  - Density: 1,610/sq mi (623/km^{2})
- Time zone: UTC-07 (Mountain (MST))
  - Summer (DST): UTC−06 (MDT)
- ZIP codes: 81135 (PO Box), 81144
- Area code: 719
- FIPS code: 08-51635
- GNIS feature ID: 2411143
- Website: https://montevista.gov/

The City of Monte Vista is the home rule municipality that is the most populous municipality in Rio Grande County, Colorado, United States. The city population was 4,247 at the 2020 Census.

== History ==
Monte Vista was laid out in 1884. The site had previously served as a watering stop for the Denver and Rio Grande Western Railroad. Monte Vista is the Spanish translation of "mountain view."

== Geography ==
According to the United States Census Bureau, the city has a total area of 2.0 square miles (5.2 km^{2}), of which, 1.9 square miles (4.9 km^{2}) is land and 0.1 square miles (0.26 km^{2}) (2.56%) is water.

== Demographics ==
Historical population
Census	Pop.	Note	%±
1890	780		—
1900	556		−28.7%
1910	2,544		357.6%
1920	2,484		−2.4%
1930	2,610		5.1%
1940	3,208		22.9%
1950	3,272		2.0%
1960	3,385		3.5%
1970	3,909		15.5%
1980	3,902		−0.2%
1990	4,324		10.8%
2000	4,529		4.7%
2010	4,444		−1.9%
2020	4,247		−4.4%

=== 2020 census ===
As of the 2020 census, Monte Vista had a population of 4,247. The median age was 39.1 years. 25.0% of residents were under the age of 18 and 19.2% of residents were 65 years of age or older. For every 100 females there were 91.4 males, and for every 100 females age 18 and over there were 87.0 males age 18 and over.

0.0% of residents lived in urban areas, while 100.0% lived in rural areas.

There were 1,770 households in Monte Vista, of which 30.5% had children under the age of 18 living in them. Of all households, 39.2% were married-couple households, 19.8% were households with a male householder and no spouse or partner present, and 35.0% were households with a female householder and no spouse or partner present. About 33.5% of all households were made up of individuals and 15.1% had someone living alone who was 65 years of age or older.

There were 1,953 housing units, of which 9.4% were vacant. The homeowner vacancy rate was 2.9% and the rental vacancy rate was 5.6%.

Racial composition as of the 2020 census
Race	Number	Percent
White	2,502	58.9%
Black or African American	29	0.7%
American Indian and Alaska Native	154	3.6%
Asian	14	0.3%
Native Hawaiian and Other Pacific Islander	1	0.0%
Some other race	764	18.0%
Two or more races	783	18.4%
Hispanic or Latino (of any race)	2,566	60.4%

== Culture ==
Monte Vista is served by the Carnegie Public Library.

Every March, nearly 20,000 Sandhill Cranes descend on the San Luis Valley before continuing their northward spring migration.

== Climate ==
Monte Vista has a cold semi-arid climate (Köppen BSk).

Climate data for Monte Vista 2W, Colorado, 1991–2020 normals, 1893-2020 extremes: 7,695 ft (2,345 m)
Month	Jan	Feb	Mar	Apr	May	Jun	Jul	Aug	Sep	Oct	Nov	Dec	Year
Record high °F (°C)	61 (16)	65 (18)	73 (23)	78 (26)	89 (32)	92 (33)	96 (36)	90 (32)	87 (31)	80 (27)	69 (21)	61 (16)	96 (36)
Mean maximum °F (°C)	47.8 (8.8)	52.7 (11.5)	65.9 (18.8)	72.2 (22.3)	79.0 (26.1)	86.7 (30.4)	88.0 (31.1)	84.7 (29.3)	81.3 (27.4)	74.7 (23.7)	62.2 (16.8)	51.1 (10.6)	88.8 (31.6)
Mean daily maximum °F (°C)	33.1 (0.6)	39.6 (4.2)	51.5 (10.8)	58.8 (14.9)	67.1 (19.5)	77.2 (25.1)	80.1 (26.7)	77.8 (25.4)	72.5 (22.5)	61.6 (16.4)	48.1 (8.9)	34.5 (1.4)	58.5 (14.7)
Daily mean °F (°C)	15.4 (−9.2)	22.3 (−5.4)	33.7 (0.9)	40.5 (4.7)	49.2 (9.6)	57.7 (14.3)	62.5 (16.9)	60.6 (15.9)	53.7 (12.1)	42.4 (5.8)	29.9 (−1.2)	17.2 (−8.2)	40.4 (4.7)
Mean daily minimum °F (°C)	−2.2 (−19.0)	5.0 (−15.0)	15.8 (−9.0)	22.2 (−5.4)	31.4 (−0.3)	38.3 (3.5)	44.9 (7.2)	43.3 (6.3)	34.8 (1.6)	23.2 (−4.9)	11.7 (−11.3)	−0.1 (−17.8)	22.4 (−5.3)
Mean minimum °F (°C)	−15.2 (−26.2)	−10.5 (−23.6)	0.3 (−17.6)	10.1 (−12.2)	21.4 (−5.9)	30.8 (−0.7)	39.2 (4.0)	37.7 (3.2)	25.8 (−3.4)	10.6 (−11.9)	−3.3 (−19.6)	−14.1 (−25.6)	−19.5 (−28.6)
Record low °F (°C)	−38 (−39)	−31 (−35)	−16 (−27)	−2 (−19)	9 (−13)	23 (−5)	31 (−1)	27 (−3)	15 (−9)	−6 (−21)	−22 (−30)	−29 (−34)	−38 (−39)
Average precipitation inches (mm)	0.40 (10)	0.32 (8.1)	0.66 (17)	0.66 (17)	0.81 (21)	0.50 (13)	1.48 (38)	1.64 (42)	1.11 (28)	0.83 (21)	0.41 (10)	0.41 (10)	9.23 (235.1)
Average snowfall inches (cm)	6.00 (15.2)	4.50 (11.4)	6.50 (16.5)	4.80 (12.2)	1.20 (3.0)	0.00 (0.00)	0.00 (0.00)	0.00 (0.00)	0.00 (0.00)	2.80 (7.1)	3.90 (9.9)	5.70 (14.5)	35.4 (89.8)
Source 1: NOAA
Source 2: XMACIS2 (records & monthly max/mins)

== See also ==
- San Luis Valley
