= La Jara, Colorado =

Town in Colorado, United States

- Statutory Town
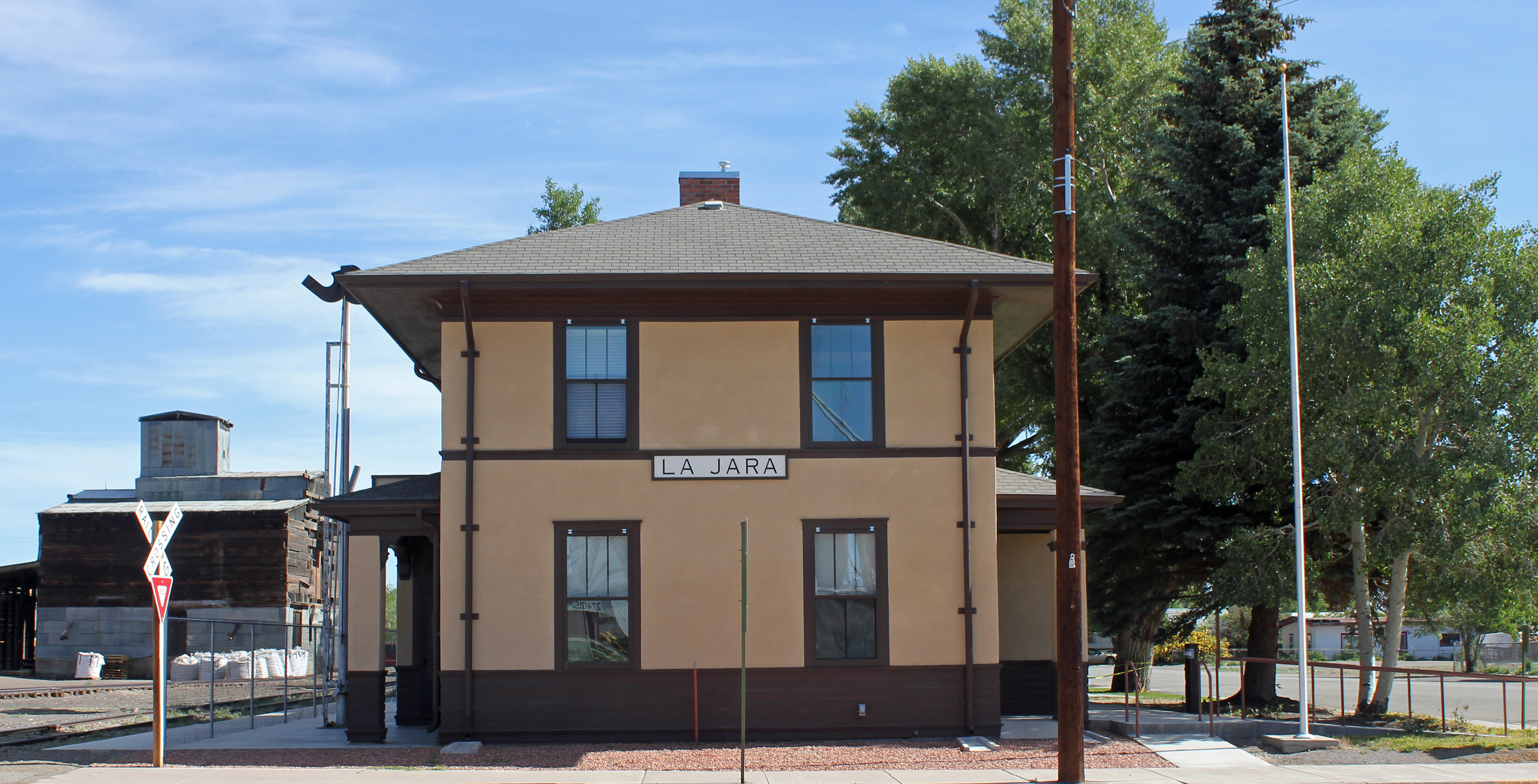
- The old La Jara railroad depot, now the town hall

- Location of La Jara in Conejos County, Colorado.
- Coordinates: 37°16′25″N 105°57′35″W
- Country: United States
- State: Colorado
- County: Conejos
- Incorporated (town): November 11, 1910

Government
  - Type: Statutory Town

Area
  - Total: 0.41 sq mi (1.06 km^{2})
  - Land: 0.41 sq mi (1.06 km^{2})
  - Water: 0 sq mi (0.00 km^{2})
- Elevation: 7,605 ft (2,318 m)

Population (2020)
  - Total: 730
  - Density: 1,800/sq mi (690/km^{2})
- Time zone: UTC-7 (Mountain (MST))
  - Summer (DST): UTC-6 (MDT)
- ZIP code: 81140
- Area code: 719
- FIPS code: 08-42055
- GNIS feature ID: 2412855
- Website: townoflajara.colorado.gov/home

La Jara is a statutory town in Conejos County, Colorado, United States. The population was 730 at the 2020 United States census.

== History ==
Catawba converts to Mormonism who settled in Colorado from South Carolina helped to establish the settlement of La Jara.

== Geography ==
La Jara is in the San Luis Valley region of Colorado. U.S. Route 285 passes through La Jara, leading north 14 miles (23 km) to Alamosa and south 20 miles (32 km) to the New Mexico border and beyond.

According to the United States Census Bureau, the town has a total area of 0.35 square miles (0.9 km^{2}), all land.

== Demographics ==
Historical population
Census	Pop.	Note	%±
1900	208		—
1910	448		115.4%
1920	521		16.3%
1930	602		15.5%
1940	897		49.0%
1950	912		1.7%
1960	724		−20.6%
1970	768		6.1%
1980	858		11.7%
1990	725		−15.5%
2000	877		21.0%
2010	818		−6.7%
2020	730		−10.8%

== Notable people ==
- Eppie Archuleta, master weaver and 1985 recipient of the National Heritage Fellowship
- Morton Blackwell, conservative political activist, born in La Jara in 1939
- Donald Valdez, former Colorado State Representative
