= National Register of Historic Places listings in Saguache County, Colorado =

Location of Saguache County in Colorado

This is a list of the National Register of Historic Places listings in Saguache County, Colorado.

This is intended to be a complete list of the properties and districts on the National Register of Historic Places in Saguache County, (Note: The place name "Saguache" is pronounced /səˈwɑːtʃ/. This name derives from either the Ute language noun "sawup" /səˈwʌp/ meaning "sand dunes" or the Ute phrase "Sa qua qua chi pa" meaning "water of the blue earth." The Spanish language version of this name is usually spelled "Saguache", while the English language version is usually spelled "Sawatch".) Colorado, United States. The locations of National Register properties and districts for which the latitude and longitude coordinates are included below, may be seen in a map.

There are 10 properties and districts listed on the National Register in the county.

This National Park Service list is complete through NPS recent listings posted July 18, 2025.

== Current listings ==
	Name on the Register	Image	Date listed	Location	City or town	Description
1	Baca Land Grant No. 4-Baca Ranch Rural Historic Landscape		September 18, 2023 (#100009333)	Cty. Rd. T 37°59′17″N 105°47′09″W	Crestone	
2	Capilla de San Juan Bautista	Capilla de San Juan Bautista	February 8, 1980 (#80000926)	Northwest of La Garita; 37°51′01″N 106°15′46″W	La Garita	
3	Carnero Creek Pictographs	Carnero Creek Pictographs	June 5, 1975 (#75000540)	Address Restricted	La Garita	
4	Crestone School	Crestone School	January 9, 1986 (#86000011)	Cottonwood St. and Carbonate Ave. 37°59′48″N 105°41′57″W	Crestone	
5	First Baptist Church of Moffat	First Baptist Church of Moffat	July 24, 2008 (#08000710)	401 Lincoln Ave. 37°59′54″N 105°54′20″W	Moffat	Ornamental Concrete Block Buildings in Colorado Multiple Property Submission
6	Indian Grove	Indian Grove	March 24, 2000 (#00000237)	Address Restricted; 37°47′18″N 105°30′35″W	Mosca	
7	Saguache Downtown Historic District	Saguache Downtown Historic District	July 25, 2014 (#14000433)	Roughly 300 & 400 blocks of 4th St. 38°05′14″N 106°08′13″W	Saguache	
8	Saguache Flour Mill	Saguache Flour Mill	September 18, 1978 (#78000885)	West of Saguache; 38°04′53″N 106°09′38″W	Saguache	
9	Saguache School and Jail Buildings	Saguache School and Jail Buildings	May 2, 1975 (#75000541)	U.S. Highway 285 and San Juan Ave. 38°05′16″N 106°08′38″W	Saguache	
10	Sargents Water Tank, Denver and Rio Grande Railroad, Western Line	Sargents Water Tank, Denver and Rio Grande Railroad, Western Line	August 12, 2010 (#10000537)	45 Front St. 38°24′16″N 106°24′57″W	Sargents	Railroads in Colorado, 1858-1948 MPS

== See also ==
- List of National Historic Landmarks in Colorado
- List of National Register of Historic Places in Colorado
- Bibliography of Colorado
- Geography of Colorado
- History of Colorado
- Index of Colorado-related articles
- List of Colorado-related lists
- Outline of Colorado
