= Phoenix Peak (Colorado) =

Mountain summit in the Front Range of Colorado

- Gwynedd Mountain, Creede Crest
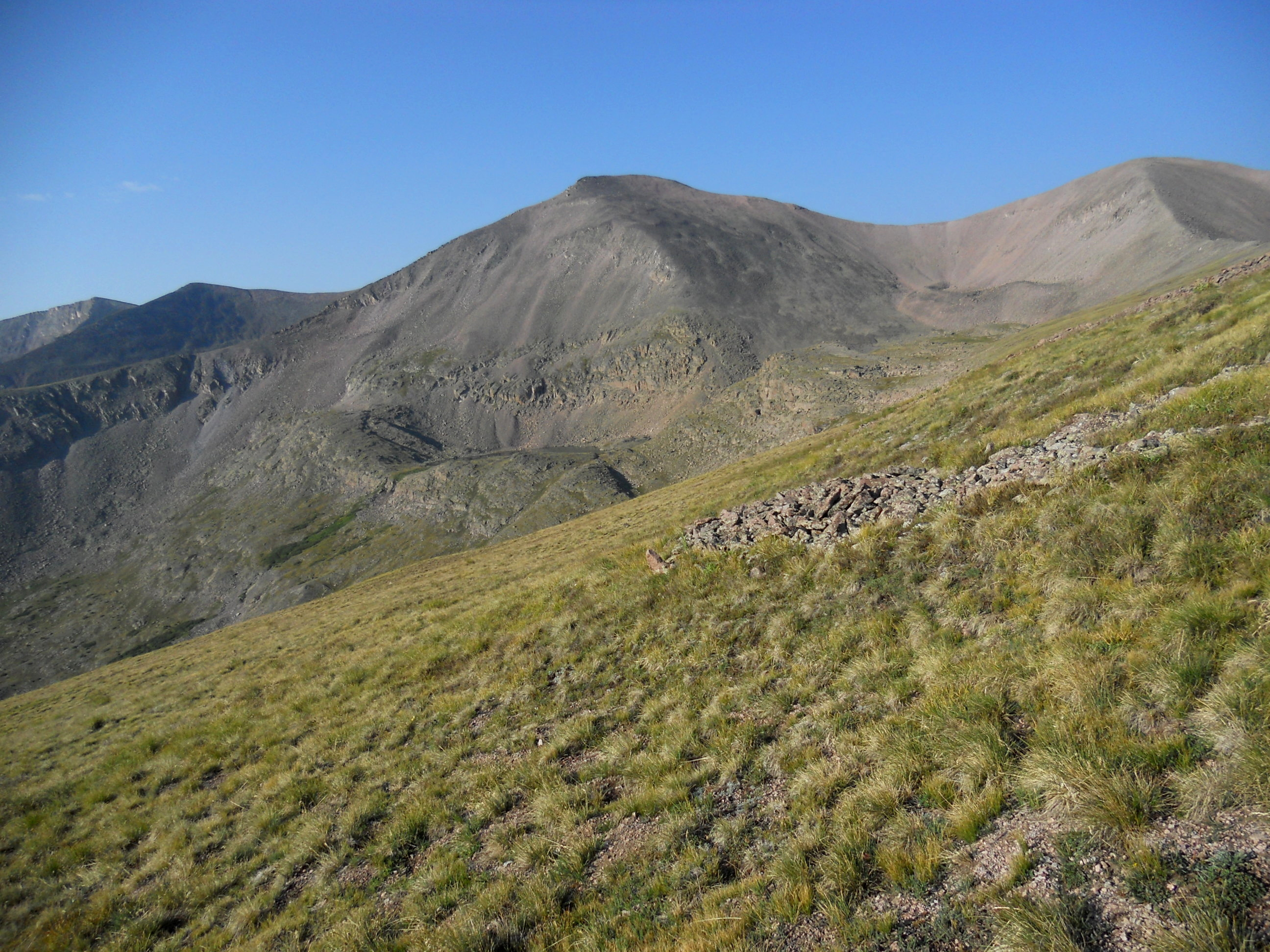
- Phoenix Peak viewed from the northeast

Highest point
- Elevation: 13,902 ft (4,237 m); NAVD88
- Prominence: 1,515 ft (462 m)
- Isolation: 4.87 mi (7.84 km) to San Luis Peak
- Listing: U.S. county high points 32nd; Colorado county high points 21st
- Coordinates: 37.936277°N 106.866358°W

Geography
- Location within Colorado
- Location: High point of Mineral County
- Country: United States
- State: Colorado
- Counties: Mineral; Saguache
- National Forest: Rio Grande National Forest
- Wilderness Area: La Garita Wilderness
- Parent range: La Garita Mountains of the Southern Rocky Mountains
- Topo map(s): USGS 7.5' topographic map Halfmoon Pass, Colorado

Phoenix Peak is a 13,902-foot (4,237 m) mountain summit in the La Garita Mountains of the US State of Colorado. The mountain in Rio Grande National Forest straddles the border between Mineral County and the La Garita Wilderness in Saguache County. Phoenix Peak is the highest point in Mineral County, Colorado. The peak is located 6.8 miles (10.9 km) north-northwest of the Mineral County Seat of Creede, Colorado.

== Mountain ==
"Phoenix Peak" is the proposed name for this second highest officially unnamed summit in Colorado. The summit has also been called "Gwynedd Mountain" and "Creede Crest".

== See also ==
- Colorado
- Geography of Colorado
- List of mountain peaks of Colorado
