= La Manga Pass =

Mountain pass in Colorado, USA

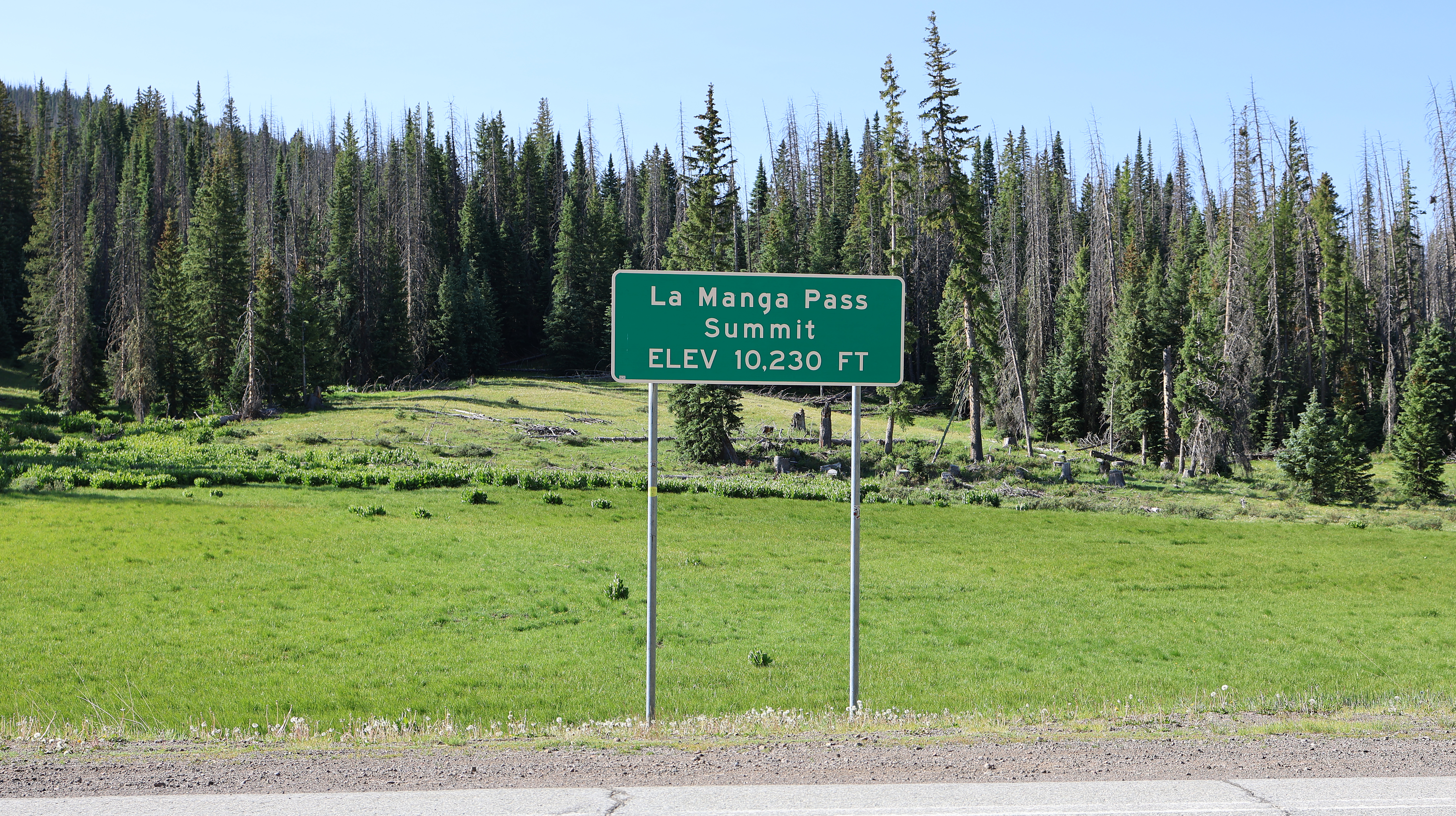
- The sign at the pass in 2025
- Interactive map of La Manga Pass
- Elevation: 10,240 feet (3,120 m)
- Traversed by: SH 17

Third Approach
- Location: Conejos County, Colorado, U.S.
- Range: San Juan Mountains
- Coordinates: 37°04′39″N 106°23′10″W
- Topo map: USGS Cumbres

La Manga Pass, elevation 10,240 ft (3,120 m), is a mountain pass in the San Juan Mountains of Colorado. The pass is situated in Rio Grande National Forest.

The pass, along with Cumbres Pass to the southwest, is traversed by State Highway 17. It is the only highway pass west out of the San Luis Valley between Wolf Creek Pass to the north and New Mexico. The pass is a watershed break between the Conejos River to the north, a tributary of the Rio Grande, and the Rio de los Pinos (Los Pinos River) to the south, which flows through Toltec Gorge and eventually joins the Conejos River via the Rio San Antonio.
