= Saguache County Museum =

Museum in Saguache County, Colorado

Coordinates: 38°5′11″N 106°8′33″W

Saguache County Museum is in Saguache County, Colorado in the San Luis Valley off Highway 285. It also manages the Hazard House Museum built in 1913 and donated to the museum in 1994.

The adobe museum building dates to 1870 and served as a school, courthouse, jail, and a residence for jailers. After the building was planned for demolition in 1958, the community rallied to keep it intact and it was turned into a museum.

The museum's collection includes Ute artifacts, settler artifacts, early 20th century medical equipment, antique rugs, Native American rugs, baskets, pottery, American flag with 38 stars, and a 1908 fire wagon and hose.

The museum had an exhibit on Alfred E. Packer. In 1996 the museum the Saguache had a display on Anne Ellis.

The museum is at 405 8th Street in Saguache. The museum is one of the sights and attractions for visitors heading into the San Juan Mountains.

== See also ==
- Saguache Downtown Historic District

== Website ==
- Saguache County Museum website
