= Rio de los Pinos =

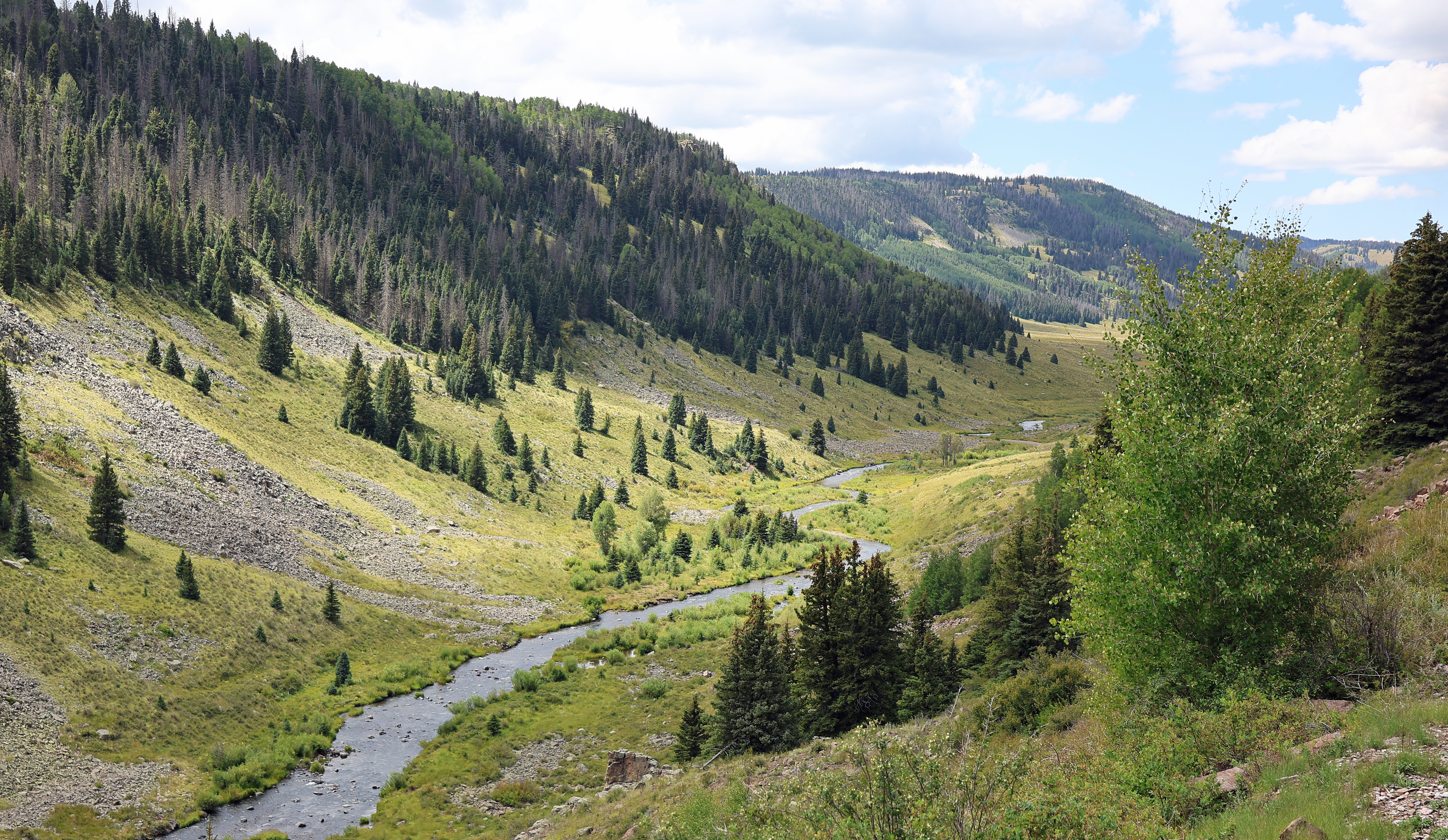
- The river west of Osier, Colorado

- The river's mouth in far southern Colorado

Physical characteristics
- Source
  - location: South San Juan Wilderness
  - coordinates: 37°6′44.03″N 106°30′0.12″W
- Mouth
  - location: Confluence with the Rio San Antonio
  - coordinates: 36°59′53.05″N 106°2′8.08″W
  - elevation: 7,970 feet (2,430 meters)

Basin features
- Progression: Rio San Antonio—Conejos River—Rio Grande
- Tributaries
  - left: North Fork Rio de los Pinos, Long Creek, Cascade Creek, Osier Creek, Cañada Jarosita
  - right: Cumbres Creek, Apache Creek, Beaver Creek, Lola Creek

The Rio de los Pinos (also called Los Pinos River) is a river in southern Colorado and northern New Mexico.

== Course ==
The river rises high in Colorado's South San Juan Wilderness near the Continental Divide in Conejos County, Colorado. From there, it flows generally southeast until it is impounded by the dam at Trujillo Meadows Reservoir. Leaving the reservoir, the river passes under Colorado State Highway 17 and turns south. Here, it receives a tributary, North Fork Rio de los Pinos. Continuing south, the river has its confluence with Cumbres Creek. Here, the river flows generally east until it passes by Osier, Colorado. There, the river turns south and enters Rio Arriba County, New Mexico. Next it passes through the Toltec Gorge. Then the river flows generally east and southeast through New Mexico until it reaches the Rio Grande del Norte National Monument. At this point, it turns northeast, crosses the border into Colorado once again, still in Conejos County, and joins the Rio San Antonio.

== Public lands ==
The river flows through both public and private lands. It flows through the South San Juan Wilderness, the Rio Grande National Forest, the Carson National Forest, the Cruces Basin Wilderness area (the river forms the northern boundary of part of this wilderness area), the Rio de los Pinos Wildlife Area, Bureau of Land Management land, and the Rio Grande del Norte National Monument.

== Monitoring station ==
The U.S.G.S. maintains a stream gauge along the river just south of the Colorado-New Mexico border near the river's mouth.

== See also ==
- List of rivers of Colorado
- List of rivers of New Mexico
- List of tributaries of the Rio Grande
