= Colorado State Highway 17 =

State highway in Colorado, United States

State Highway 17
- Map of southern Colorado with SH 17 highlighted in red

Route information
- Maintained by CDOT
- Length: 88.5 mi (142.4 km)

Major junctions
- South end: NM 17 at the New Mexico state line near Cumbres Pass
- US 285 in Antonito; US 160 / US 285 in Alamosa; US 160 in Alamosa East; SH 112 near Hooper
- North end: US 285 south of Villa Grove

Location
- Country: United States
- State: Colorado
- Counties: Archuleta, Conejos, Alamosa, Saguache

Highway system
- Colorado State Highway System; Interstate; US; State; Scenic
← SH 16	→ SH 21

State Highway 17 (SH 17) is an 88.5 mi (142.4 km) state highway in southern Colorado, United States. SH 17's southern terminus is a continuation as New Mexico State Road 17 (NM 17) at the New Mexico state line, and the northern terminus is at U.S. Route 285 (US 285) south of Villa Grove.

== Route description ==
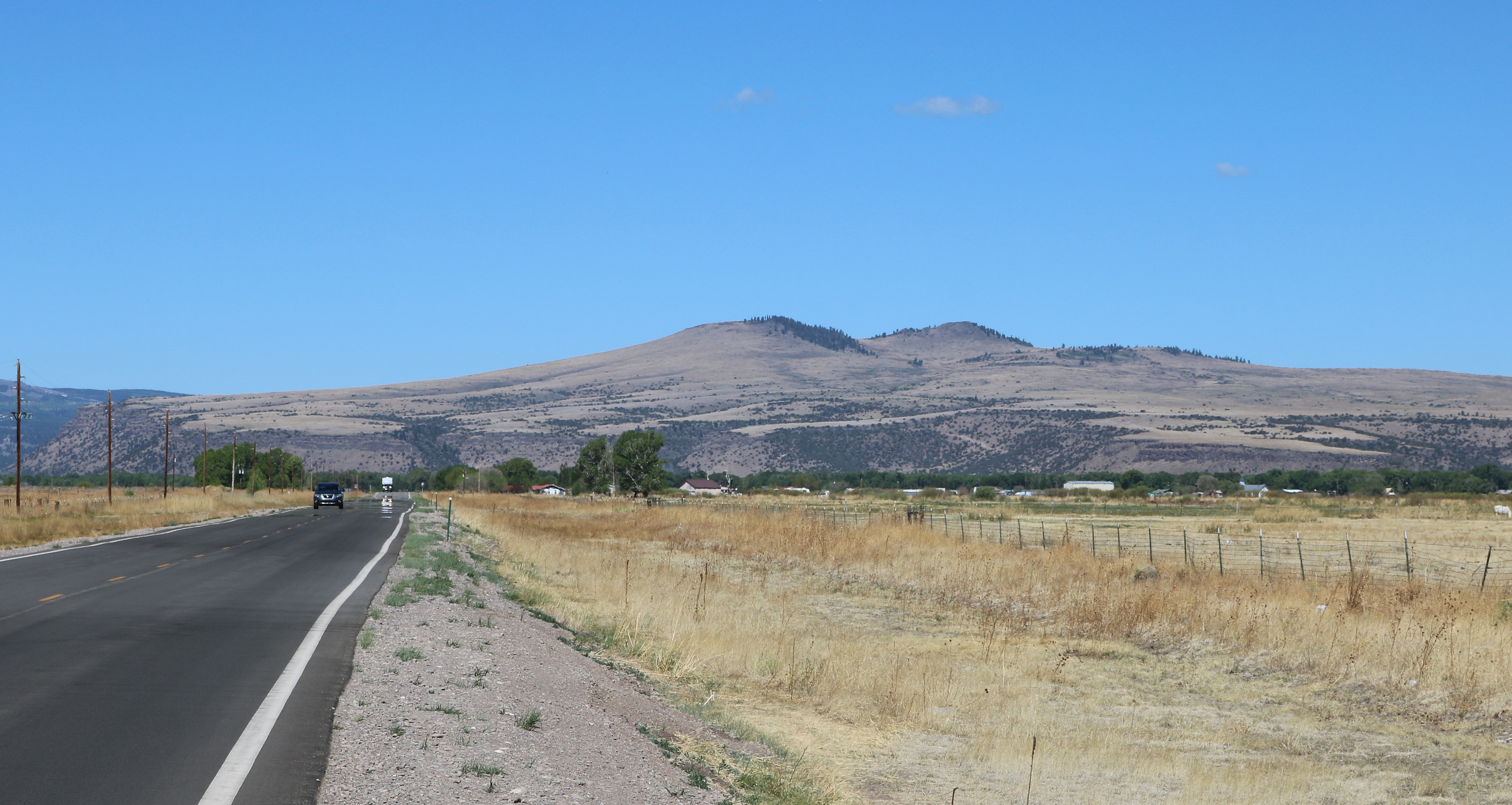
SH 17 by Mogote with Los Mogotes in the background, May 2020

SH 17 is officially split into two parts by a stretch of concurrence with US 285. The first part of the route begins in the south at the New Mexico state line where the road becomes New Mexico State Road 17. From the state line the road proceeds in a winding, generally easterly path over the San Juan Mountains via Cumbres Pass and La Manga Pass, both over 10,000 ft (3,000 m) in elevation. Along this section, the road offers access to Rio Grande National Forest and the many recreational activities it offers.

After leaving the national forest, the road continues east for approximately 13 more miles before merging with US 285 at Antonito. From Antonito, SH 17 runs northward concurrent with US 285 for just over thirty miles to the city of Alamosa. At Alamosa, the second part of SH 17 begins after the road splits from US 285. From there, the road proceeds northward up the middle of the San Luis Valley between the Sangre de Christo Mountains in the east and the San Juan Mountains to the west. The route passes through the towns of Mosca, Hooper (where the road meets the eastern end of SH 112) and Moffat before reaching its northern terminus where it again meets US 285 roughly five miles south of Villa Grove.

== History ==
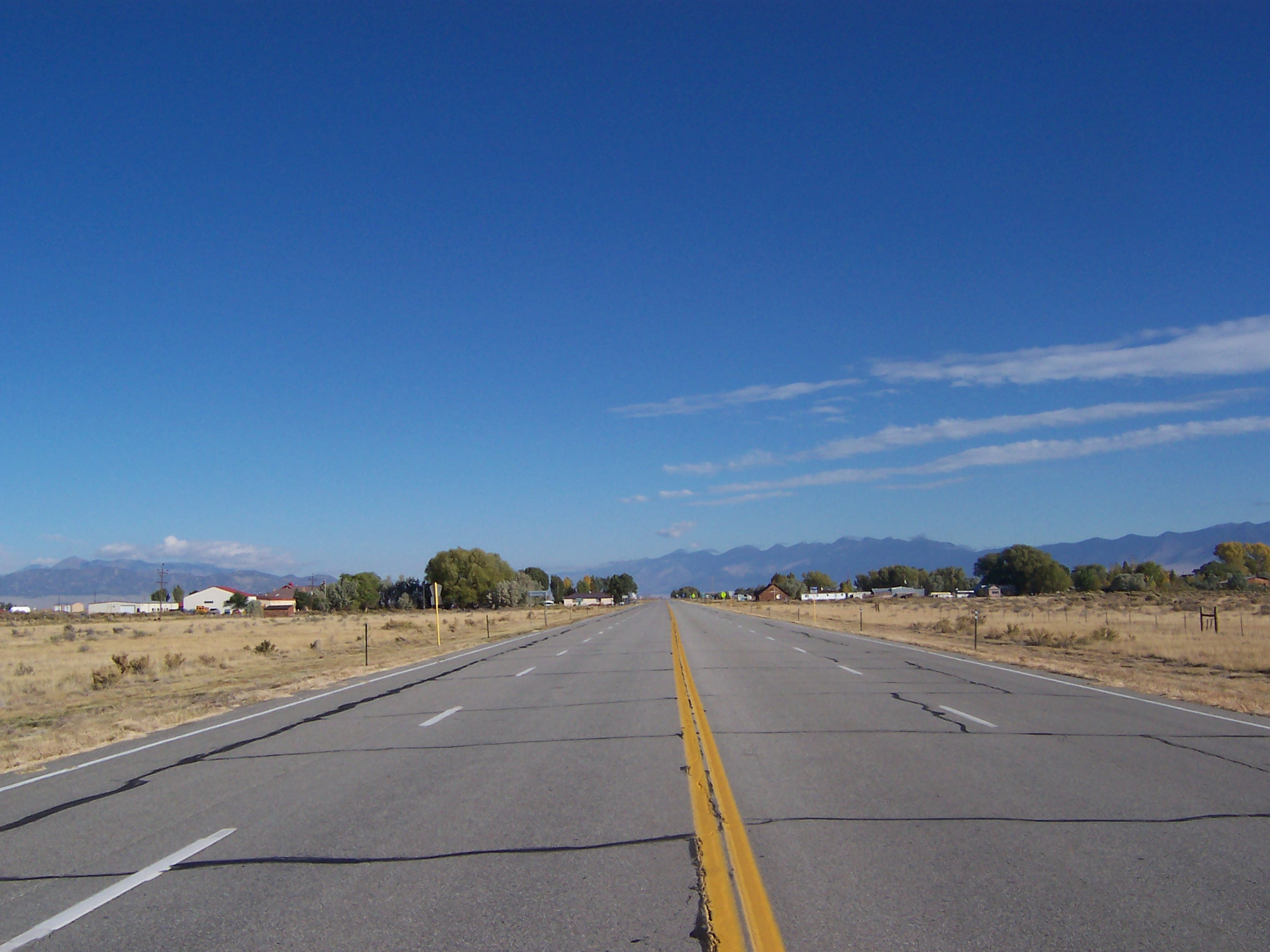
SH 17 looking north toward Moffat from near Road T, May 2020

When the route was established in the 1920s, the route was broken into two sections. The road began at Pagosa Springs and began southeast and disappeared as the route ended at the New Mexico state line. The route then reappeared northeast and terminated at SH 15 (now moved) near Mineral Hot Springs. Within the northeast segment, the route from Antonito to Alamosa was paved by 1936. The portion of the eastern segment from the New Mexico state line to Antonito was deleted and readded by 1938 and 1946, respectively. The rest of the route, not included the segment from New Mexico to Antonito, was paved by 1954. In 1968, the sections of the highway that were concurrent with other highways were eliminated, leaving the two segments existent now. The route was paved by 1970.

== Major intersections ==
County	Location	mi	km	Destinations	Notes
Archuleta		0.000	0.000	NM 17 south – Chama	Southern terimnus; Continuation into New Mexico
Conejos	Antonito	39.05	62.84	US 285 south – Santa Fe, Tres Piedras	Southern end of US 285 concurrency
Gap along US 285
Alamosa	Alamosa	69.02	111.08	US 160 (Sixth Street) / US 285 north – Monte Vista	6th St. is a one-way street, inbound access only; northern end of US 285 concurrency; southern end of US 160 concurrency
Alamosa	Alamosa	69.09	111.19	US 160 west / US 285 north (Main Street west) – Monte Vista	Main St. is a one-way street, outbound access only; no northbound access
Alamosa	Rio Grande	70.00	112.65	Bridge	
Alamosa	Alamosa East	70.12	112.85	US 160 east – Walsenburg	Northern end of US 160 concurrency
Alamosa–Saguache county line	Hooper	88.19	141.93	SH 112 west – Center	Eastern terminus of SH 112
Saguache		118.86	191.29	US 285 – Saguache, Monte Vista, Poncha Springs, Salida	Northern terminus
1.000 mi = 1.609 km; 1.000 km = 0.621 mi: Concurrency terminus; Incomplete access

== See also ==
- List of state highways in Colorado

== Notes ==
a: The section of SH 17 which runs concurrent to US 285 is maintained with federal rather than state funds and is therefore not counted by the Colorado Department of Transportation in the road's official 88.5 mile length; the total end-to-end length including this segment is 118.8 mi (191.2 km).
