= Mogote, Colorado =

Unincorporated community in Conejos County, CO, USA

Coordinates: 37°03′34″N 106°05′32″W

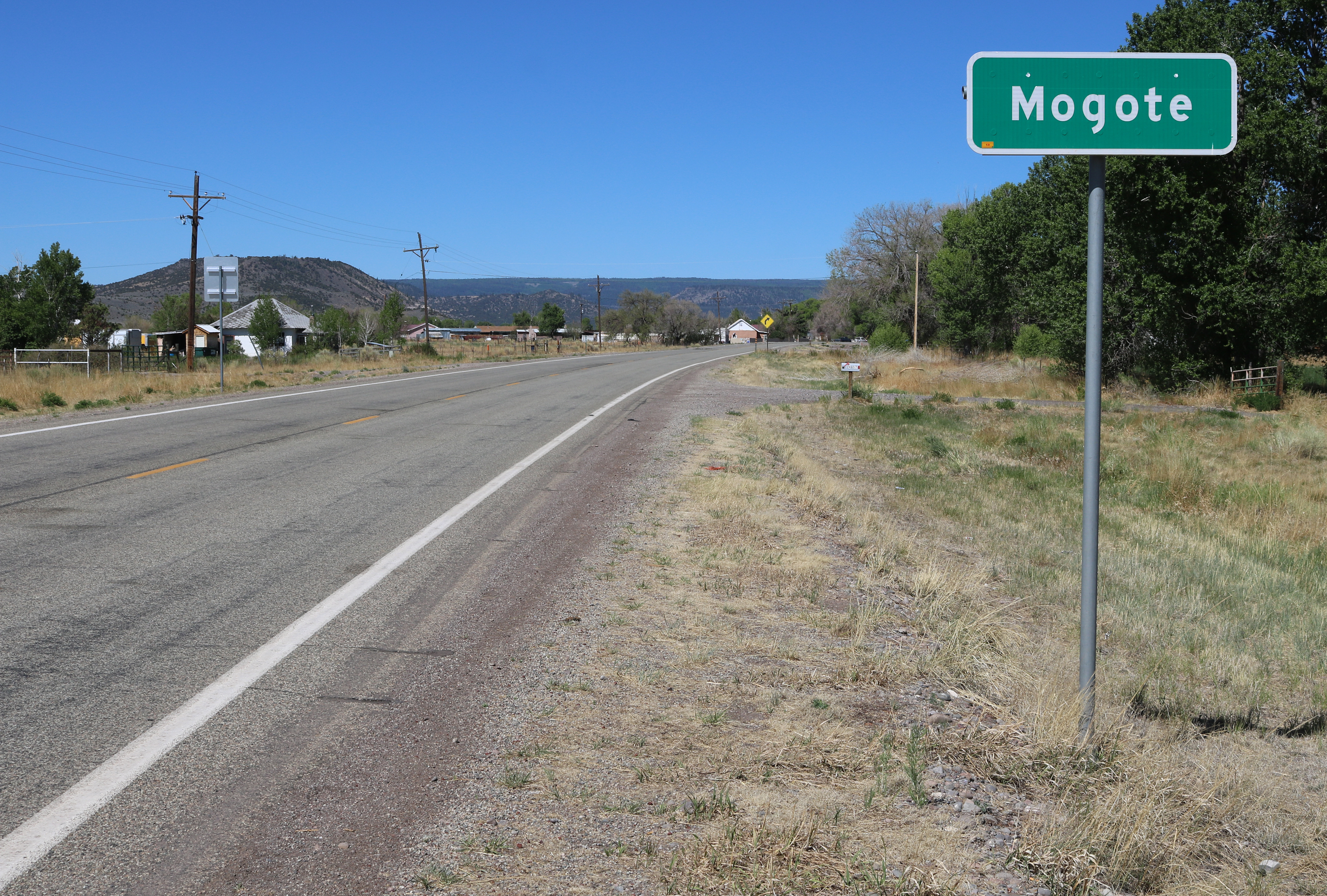
Entering from the east along State Highway 17

Mogote is an unincorporated community in Conejos County, in the U.S. state of Colorado.

The site is located on Colorado Highway 17 south of the Conejos River and about four miles (6.4 km) west of Antonito.

== History ==
A post office called Mogote was established in 1897, and remained in operation until 1920. The community was named for Mogotes near the town site.
