= Mineral Hot Springs (Colorado) =

Hot springs town in Colorado

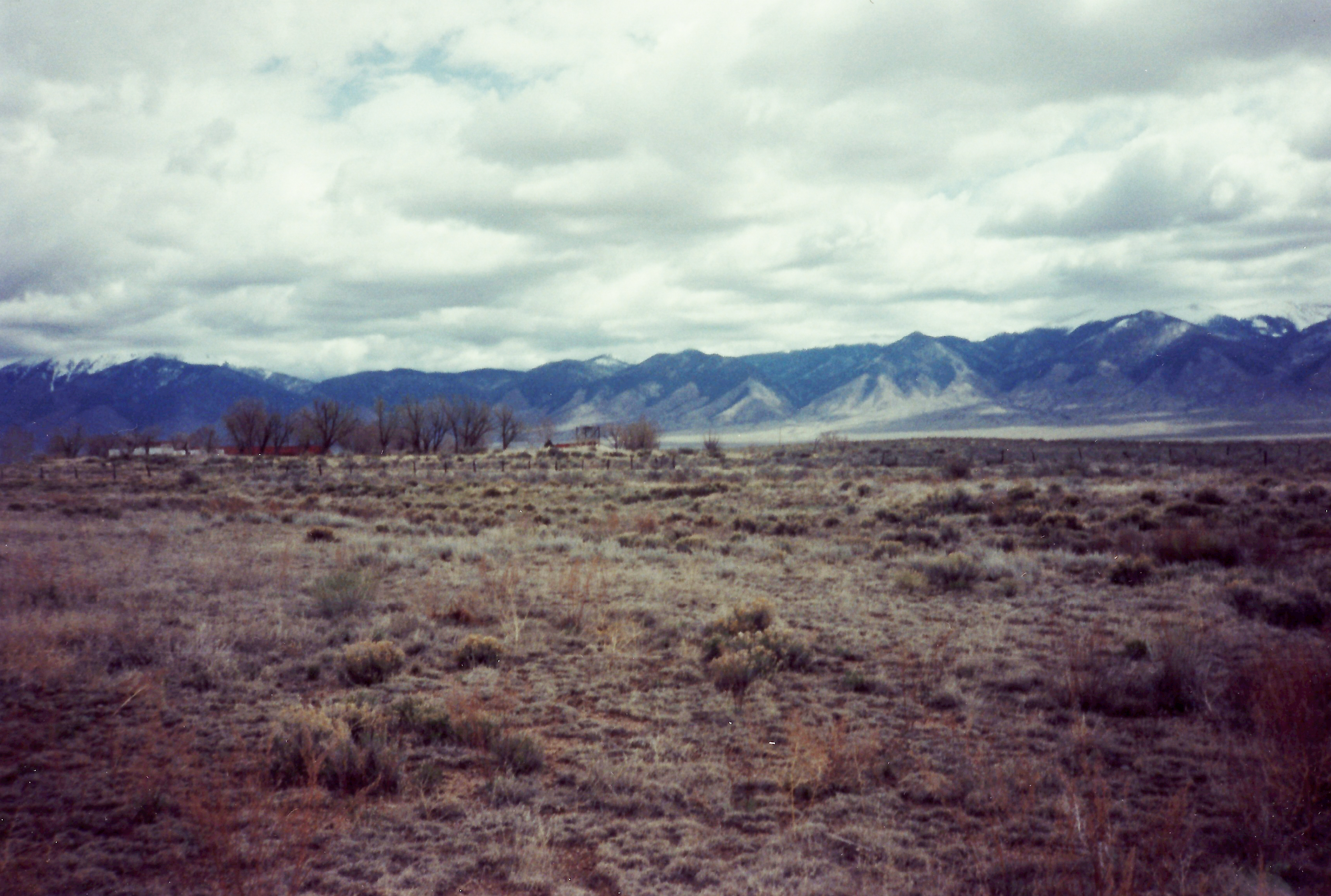
- View from the south in 1990
- Interactive map of Mineral Hot Springs
- Location: San Luis Valley, Colorado
- Coordinates: 38.168°N 105.924°W
- Type: geothermal
- Temperature: 140 °F (60 °C)

Mineral Hot Springs is a thermal spring located in Saguache County, Colorado in the northern San Luis Valley.

== History ==
Before the 1860s, the springs were used by the local Capote (Kapota) and Mohuache (Muache) bands of Ute indigenous people who lived in the valley and valued the hot water and mud for the healing of wounds.

== Water profile ==
The springs emerge from low formations deposited by the mineral water at 140°F (60°C). If not tapped, and hydrostatic pressure is sufficient.

== Location ==
Mineral Hot Springs is located on Highway 17 about a mile south of its junction with U.S. 285 about 6 miles south of Villa Grove, Colorado. Mineral Hot Springs had a post office from 1911 to 1946. Mineral Hot Springs is a platted subdivision but many lots are now privately owned. In the post-colonial years, there have been some facilities built at Mineral Hot Springs. In its recent history a covered swimming pool, a motel, a cafe, a hotel, a spa and a gas station have been built nearby. 38.168°N 105.924°W
