= Carnero Pass =

Mountain pass in Colorado, USA

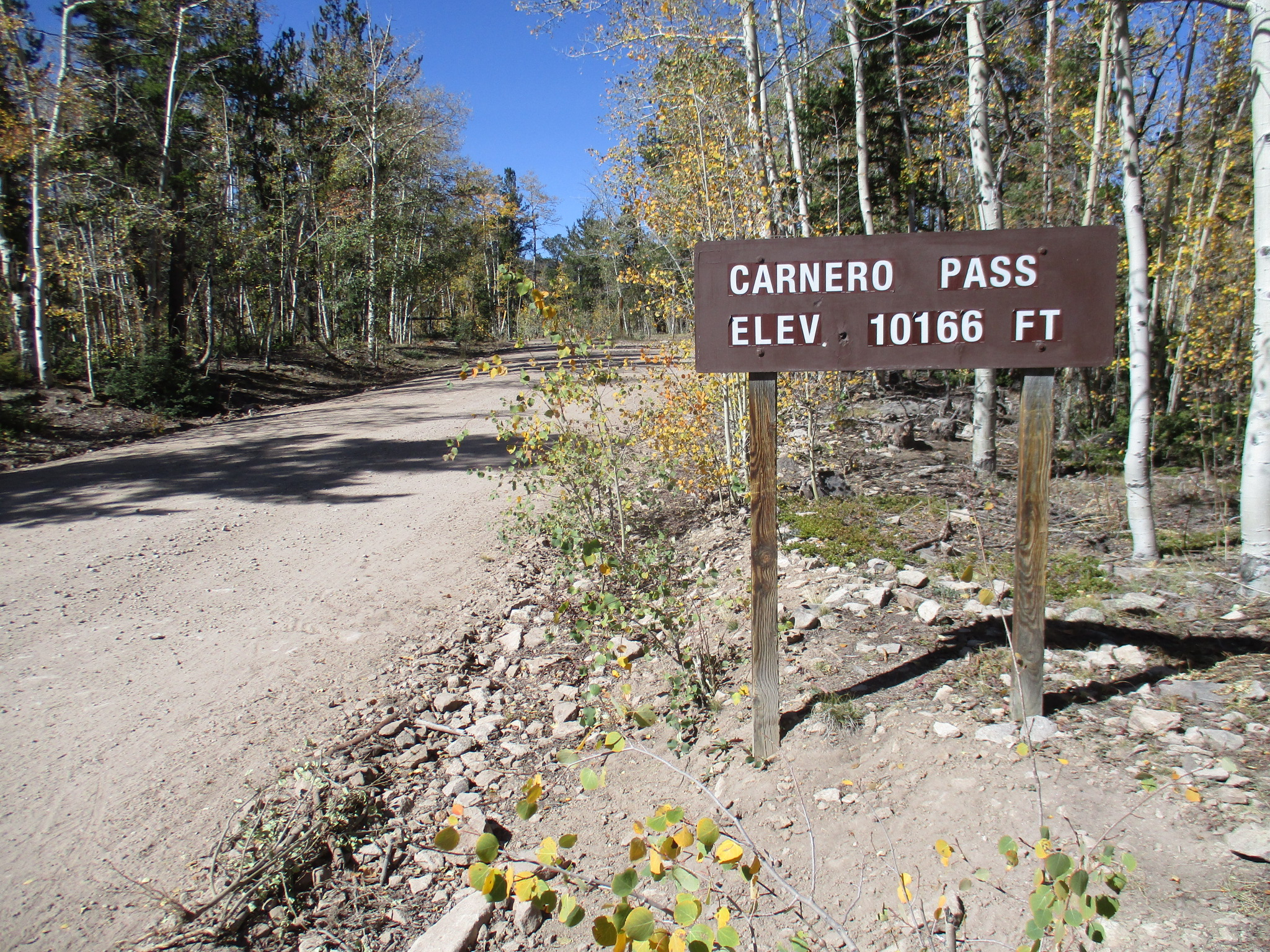
- Carnero Pass
- Interactive map of Carnero Pass
- Elevation: 10,166 ft (3,099 m)
- Traversed by: Saguache County Road 41G (Unpaved road)

Third Approach
- Location: Saguache County, Colorado, United States
- Range: La Garita Mountains
- Coordinates: 38°00′16″N 106°25′50″W
- Topo map: USGS Lake Mountain

Carnero Pass (elevation 10,166 feet (3,099 m)) is a mountain pass in Saguache County of south-central Colorado. It is located in the La Garita Mountains, a sub-range of the San Juan Mountains, and divides the waters of Houselog Creek to the north and Carnero Creek to the south. Carnero Pass is traversed by County Road 41G.

The Utes and trappers had established a trail over the pass by the mid 19th Century and by the 1870s, wagons were traversing the pass.
