= Villa Grove =

Villa Grove may refer to a place in the United States:

- Villa Grove, Colorado
- Villa Grove, Illinois
