= Trujillo Meadows Reservoir =

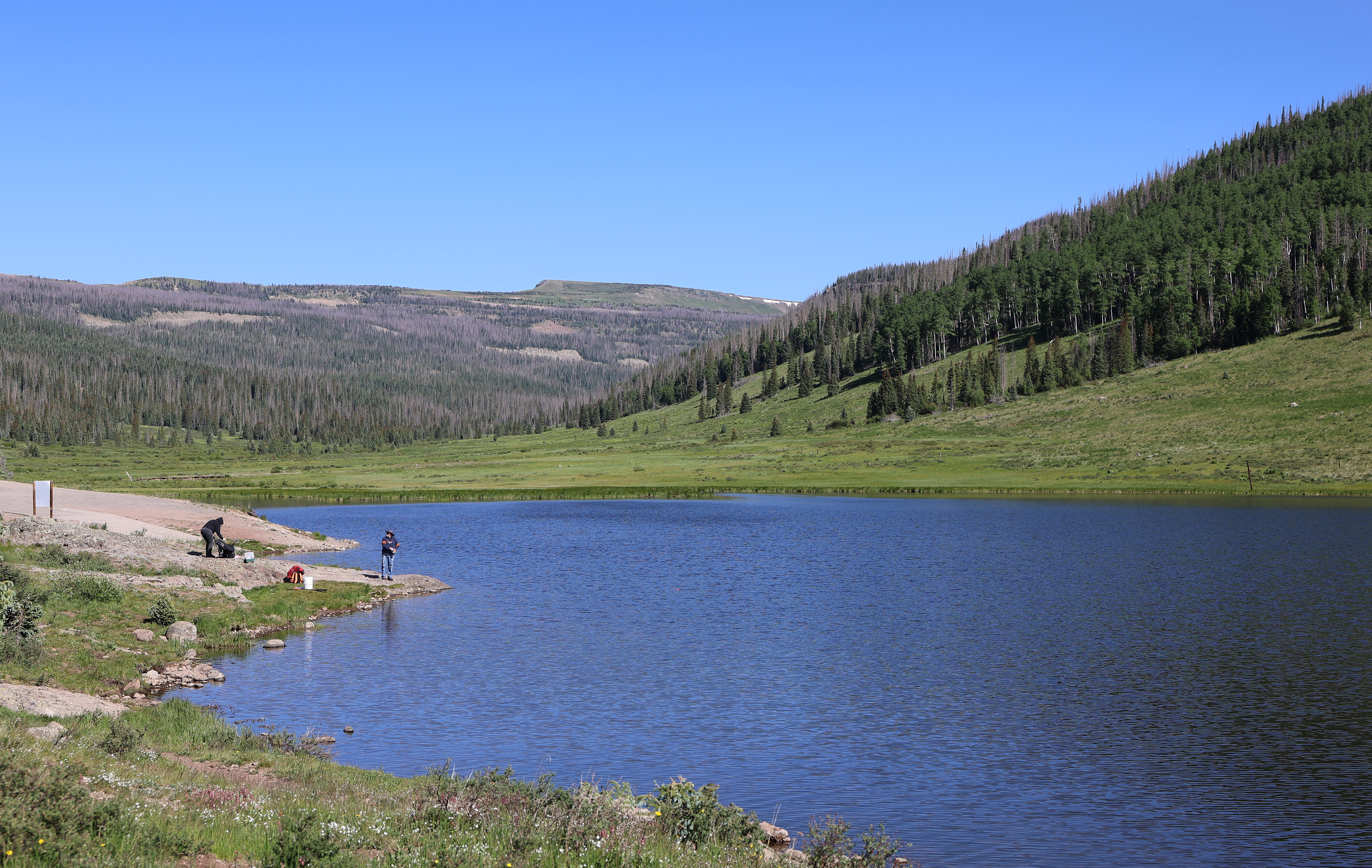
- The reservoir in 2025

- The reservoir's location in Colorado
- Location: Conejos County, Colorado, U.S.
- Coordinates: 37°03′5.28″N 106°27′7.37″W
- Type: reservoir
- Primary inflows: Rio de los Pinos
- Primary outflows: Rio de los Pinos
- Basin countries: United States
- Managing agency: Colorado Parks and Wildlife
- Designation: Trujillo Meadows Reservoir State Wildlife Area
- Built: 1954
- Surface area: 69 acres (28 hectares)
- Water volume: 1,925 acre-feet (2,374,000 cubic meters)
- Surface elevation: 10,023 feet (3,055 meters)

Trujillo Meadows Reservoir lies in a remote area of Conejos County, Colorado, U.S., near Cumbres Pass. The reservoir, which lies at an elevation of 10,023 feet (3,055 meters) in Colorado's San Juan Mountains, is used for fishing and is a Colorado state wildlife area. The state wildlife area is surrounded by the Rio Grande National Forest. The reservoir lies about four miles (6.4 km) from Cumbres Pass on Forest Service Road 118.

== Camping ==
The Forest Service operates a campground called Trujillo Meadows Campground. It is located about one mile (1.6 km) before the reservoir on the access road and has 50 camp sites.

== Dam ==
The Trujillo Meadows Dam, NID ID CO00788, is a 57-foot (17-meter) high earthen dam that can store up to 1,925 acre-feet (2,374,000 cubic meters) of water. It was built in 1954 and is 315 feet (96 meters) wide. The dam and reservoir are owned by Colorado Parks and Wildlife.

== State wildlife area ==
The lake and the immediate area around it make up the Trujillo Meadows Reservoir State Wildlife Area. Fishing is the wildlife area's chief activity. The reservoir has 69 surface acres (28 ha) and has a boat ramp. Anglers catch brown trout, rainbow trout, and sometimes brook trout.

== See also ==
Rio de los Pinos
