= New Mexico State Road 29 =

State highway in New Mexico, United States

State Road 29
- NM 29 highlighted in red

Route information
- Maintained by NMDOT
- Length: 1.050 mi (1.690 km)

Major junctions
- South end: NM 17 at Chama
- North end: Edward Sargent Wildlife Area at Chama

Location
- Country: United States
- State: New Mexico
- Counties: Rio Arriba

Highway system
- New Mexico State Highway System; Interstate; US; State; Scenic
← NM 28	→ NM 30

State Road 29 (NM 29) is a state highway in the US state of New Mexico. Its total length is approximately 1 mile (1.6 km). NM 29's southern terminus is at NM 17 in Chama, and the northern terminus is at the entrance to Edward Sargent Wildlife Area in Chama.

== Major intersections ==
The entire route is in Chama, Rio Arriba County.

mi	km	Destinations	Notes
0.000	0.000	NM 17	Southern terminus
1.050	1.690	Edward Sargent Wildlife Area	Northern terminus
1.000 mi = 1.609 km; 1.000 km = 0.621 mi
