= New Mexico State Road 17 =

State highway in New Mexico, United States

State Road 17
- NM 17 highlighted in red

Route information
- Maintained by NMDOT
- Length: 9.59 mi (15.43 km)
- Existed: c. 1940–present

Major junctions
- South end: US 64 / US 84 in Chama
- North end: SH 17 near Lobato

Location
- Country: United States
- State: New Mexico
- Counties: Rio Arriba

Highway system
- New Mexico State Highway System; Interstate; US; State; Scenic
← NM 16	→ NM 18

New Mexico State Road 17 (NM 17) is a 9.59-mile-long (15.43 km) state highway in Rio Arriba County, New Mexico. Its southern end is at US 64-84 in Chama and its northern end is at Colorado State Highway 17 at the Colorado state line.

== Route description ==
The route begins at an intersection with US 64 and U.S. Route 84 in New Mexico south of Chama. The road then heads north into central Chama along Terrace Avenue. NM 17 then exits Chama and heads northeastward, passing through a wooded area in northern Rio Arriba County and running adjacent to the Cumbres and Toltec Scenic Railroad. The road then reaches the Colorado state line, where it becomes Colorado State Highway 17, heading north towards Cumbres Pass.

== History ==
Before 1940 it was originally part of NM 2 then later U.S. Route 285 (US 285). It was renamed NM 19 in 1940 when US 285 was rerouted through Tres Piedras. Then in the 1950s it was renamed NM 17 to match Colorado State Highway 17 (SH 17).

== Major intersections ==
The entire route is in Rio Arriba County.

Location	mi	km	Destinations	Notes
Chama	0.000	0.000	US 64 / US 84 – Tierra Amarilla, Dulce, Pagosa Springs	Southern terminus; road continues as US 64 east/US 84 south
	1.750	2.816	NM 29 (First Street) – Edward Sargent Wildlife Area elk viewing facility	Southern terminus of NM 29
	9.590	15.434	SH 17 east	Continuation into Colorado
1.000 mi = 1.609 km; 1.000 km = 0.621 mi
