= Cruces Basin Wilderness =

Wilderness area in New Mexico, United States

- IUCN category Ib (wilderness area)
- Location: New Mexico, United States
- Coordinates: 36.94°N 106.29°W
- Area: 18,876 acres (7,639 ha)
- Established: 1980-12-19
- Governing body: U.S. Forest Service

Cruces Basin Wilderness is a 18,876-acre (7,639 ha) wilderness area located within the Carson National Forest in New Mexico just south of the Colorado border. The area was added to the National Wilderness Preservation System on December 19, 1980 by Public Law 95-550. The wilderness is approximately 7 miles (11 km) in length from north to south and 5 miles (8.0 km) in width from east to west. It consists of the drainage basins of three small creeks, Cruces, Beaver, and Diablo-Escondido, which join each other and flow into the Rio de los Pinos, a tributary of the Rio Grande, at the northern edge of the wilderness. The western edge of the wilderness is near the Continental Divide Trail. With elevations ranging from 8,525–10,900 feet (2,598–3,322 m), the wilderness basin contains forest, meadows, and rock features.

== Flora and fauna ==
The area consists of spruce-fir, ponderosa pine, and aspen forests as well as high elevation grassy meadows. A large forest fire in 1979 cleared old-growth forest, making room for the aspen forests and meadows present today. The area provides habitat for elk, deer, mountain lion, black bear and coyote. Creeks contain brook, brown, and rainbow trout, as well as beaver.
