= Rio San Antonio (Colorado–New Mexico) =

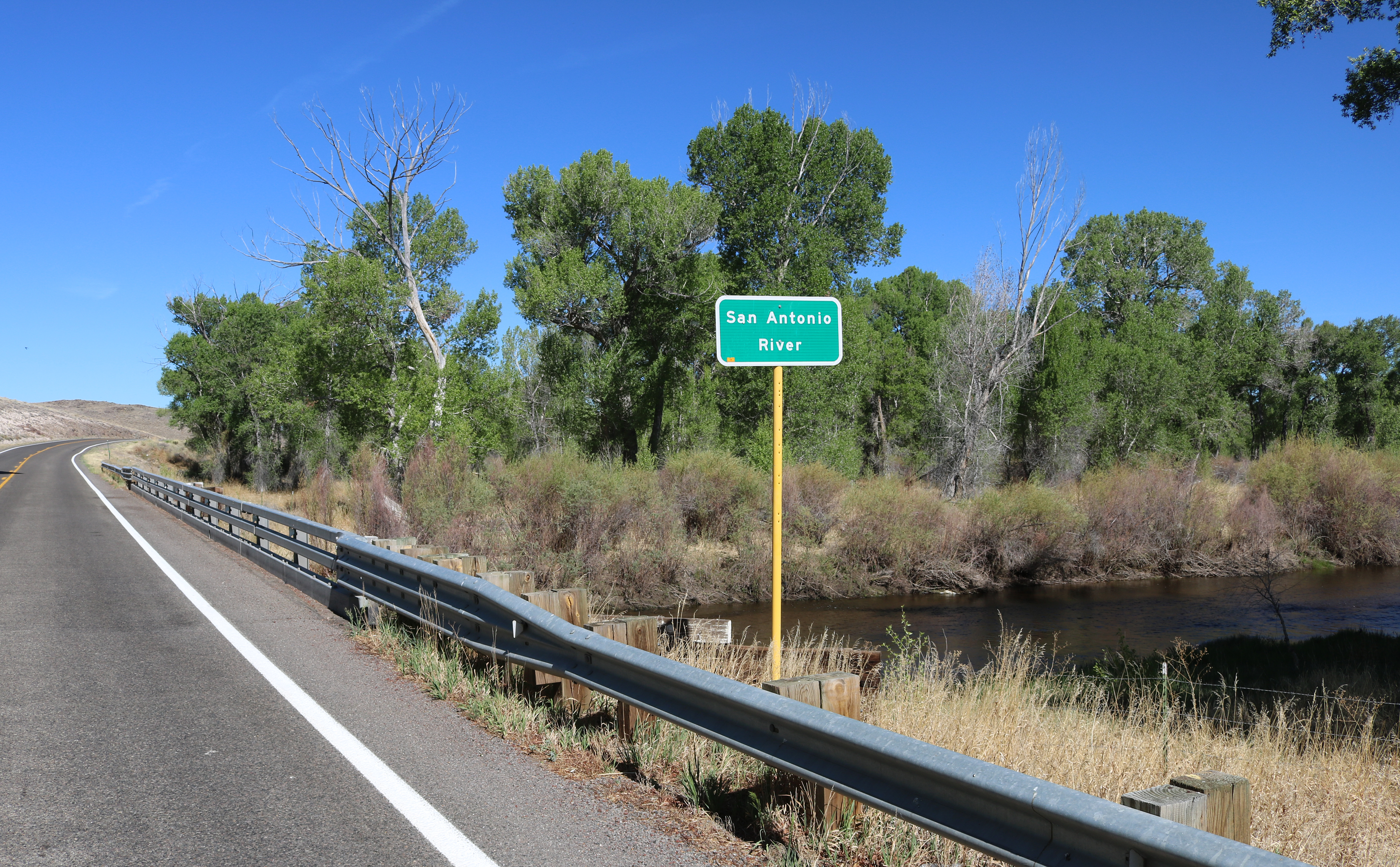
- At Highway 142 east of Manassa

Location
- Country: United States
- States: Colorado, New Mexico

Physical characteristics
- Source: Tusas Mountains
  - location: Carson National Forest, New Mexico
  - coordinates: 36°50′56″N 106°18′15″W
- Mouth: Conejos River
  - location: near Manassa, Colorado
  - coordinates: 37°11′14″N 105°53′54″W
- Basin size: 348 mi^{2} (900 km^{2})
- Discharge
  - location: near mouth
  - average: 80.6 cu ft/s (2.28 m^{3}/s)
  - minimum: 0 cu ft/s (0 m^{3}/s)
  - maximum: 2,620 cu ft/s (74 m^{3}/s)

Basin features
- Progression: Conejos River → Rio Grande

Rio San Antonio is a tributary of the Conejos River in northern New Mexico and southern Colorado in the United States. Via the Conejos River, it is part of the upper Rio Grande system. The river is used extensively for irrigation in its lower course through the southern San Luis Valley.

The river begins at the western boundary of the Carson National Forest, in the Tusas Mountains, in Rio Arriba County, New Mexico. It flows east through a steep canyon and receives Rio Nutritas from the south, continuing east towards San Antonio Mountain. Before reaching the mountain it turns north, entering the rocky Taos Plateau volcanic field on the fringe of the San Luis Valley. It enters Conejos County, Colorado at Ortiz, where the Rio de los Pinos joins from the west. The river turns sharply east at Antonito, then continues northeast through farmland before emptying into the Conejos River at Sego Springs Wildlife Area, a few miles east of Manassa.

== Rio San Antonio Wilderness ==
Established in 2019 by the U.S. Congress, the Rio San Antonio Wilderness covers 8,120 acres along the river and is managed by the U.S. Bureau of Land Management within the Rio Grande del Norte National Monument. This wilderness area primarily protects a 100-foot gorge along the Rio San Antonio and the surrounding plains at an elevation of 8,400 feet (2560 m).

== See also ==
- List of rivers of Colorado
- List of rivers of New Mexico
- List of tributaries of the Rio Grande
- List of U.S. Wilderness Areas
