= La Garita Mountains =

Mountain range in Colorado, United States

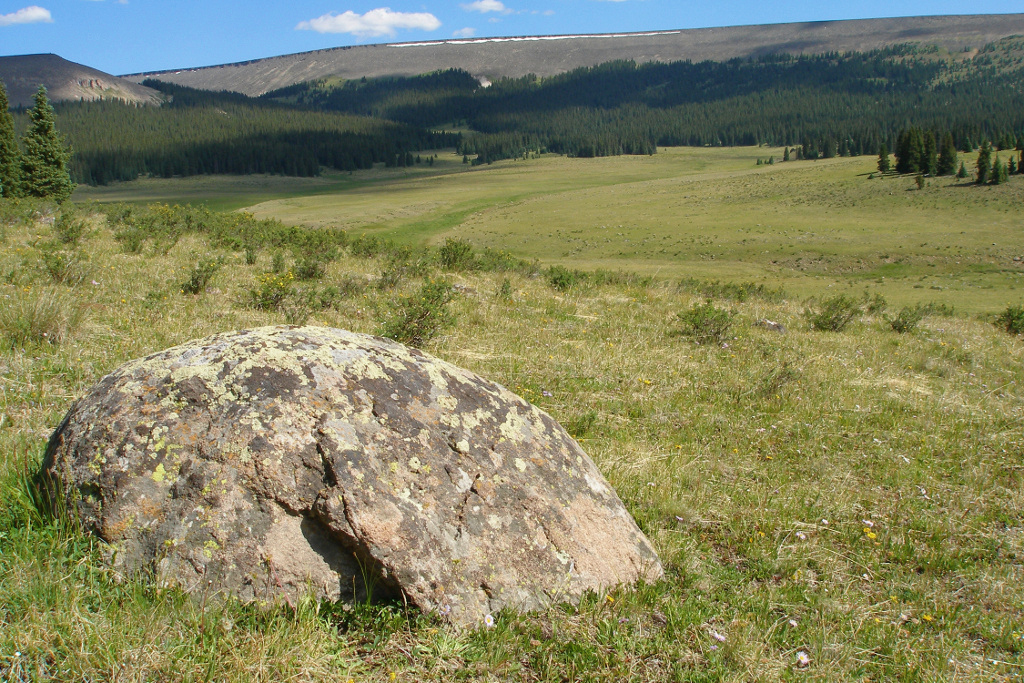
- Silver Park in the La Garita Mountains

Highest point
- Peak: Phoenix Peak
- Elevation: 13,895 ft (4,235 m)
- Coordinates: 37°56′11″N 106°51′59″W

Geography
- Location within Colorado
- Country: United States
- State: Colorado
- Counties: Saguache and Mineral
- Parent range: San Juan Mountains, Rocky Mountains

The La Garita Mountains are a high mountain range in the San Juan Mountains, a sub-range of the Southern Rocky Mountains. The mountains are located in Saguache and Mineral counties in southwestern Colorado and are almost entirely managed as public land within the Rio Grande National Forest.

The La Garita Mountains extend from near the town of Creede east and northeast over 30 miles (48 km) toward the San Luis Valley. The range is marked by a circuitous ridge with the westernnmost peak being Phoenix Peak (elevation 13,895 feet (4,235 m)) near the Continental Divide and the easternmost peak being Lookout Mountain (elevation 11,516 feet (3,510 m)) near Carnero Pass.

La Garita means 'the lookout' in Spanish. Along this range climbers can look south across the upper Rio Grande Valley and east across the San Luis Valley.

The western third of the La Garita Mountains is protected within the La Garita Wilderness, one of Colorado's lesser-known wilderness areas. Travel in the wilderness is restricted to those on foot and horseback, while the remainder of the range is more accessible with multiple roads allowing mechanized travel. The range includes montane and subalpine forests and meadows and alpine tundra that provide ideal habitats for elk and mule deer.

== Geology ==
The La Garita Mountains are dominated by Tertiary volcanic rocks, including lavas, ash flow tuffs, and breccias. These materials originated from over a dozen volcanoes and multiple eruptions in the San Juan volcanic field. The rocks exposed today are from eruptions 35 million years ago to 26 million years ago.

After major eruptions emptied the magma chamber below these volcanoes, the overlying rock could collapse and produce a sunken crater called a caldera. Evidence of such calderas are found throughout the San Juan Volcanic Field, including where the La Garita Mountains occur today. One of the largest of these volcanoes was the La Garita Caldera, which is located on the western extent of the La Garita Mountains. It was active 27.8 million years ago, and within this caldera, later eruptions (27.3 million years ago) produced the Bachelor Caldera. Through time, these calderas have filled with additional volcanic material ejected from other volcanoes, and subsequent erosion has reshaped the landscape making the ancient calderas now difficult to detect.

Evidence of glaciation is present at the highest elevations of the La Garita Mountains. Glacial cirques are particularly evident along the higher, western extent of the range where tarns and glacial deposits are found.

The Wheeler Geologic Area, located along the northeast wall the Bachelor Caldera, is noted for its eroded and exposed layers of volcanic tuff that filled the caldera. This 27 million year old tuff was ejected from eruptions in the San Luis Caldera Complex located north of the La Garita Mountains.

== Climate ==
The climate of the La Garita Mountains is classified in the Köppen system as a subarctic climate (Dfc) at lower elevations and a tundra climate (ET) above treeline, with cold, snowy winters and cool summers. It receives precipitation as snow in winter and as thunderstorms in summer, with June typically being a drier month.

== Mountains ==
Notable summits along the La Garita Mountains’ ridge, as delineated by the United States Board on Geographic Names, from west to east.

- Phoenix Peak, 13,895 feet (4,235 m) – highest summit in the La Garita Mountains
- La Garita Peak, 13,710 feet (4,179 m)
- Mesa Mountain, 12,944 feet (3,945 m)
- Bowers Peak, 12,458 feet (3,797 m)
- Lookout Mountain, 11,516 feet (3,510 m)
- Unnamed Peak 11,021, 11,021 feet (3,359 m)
