= Capilla de San Juan Bautista =

Historic church in Colorado, United States

- U.S. National Register of Historic Places
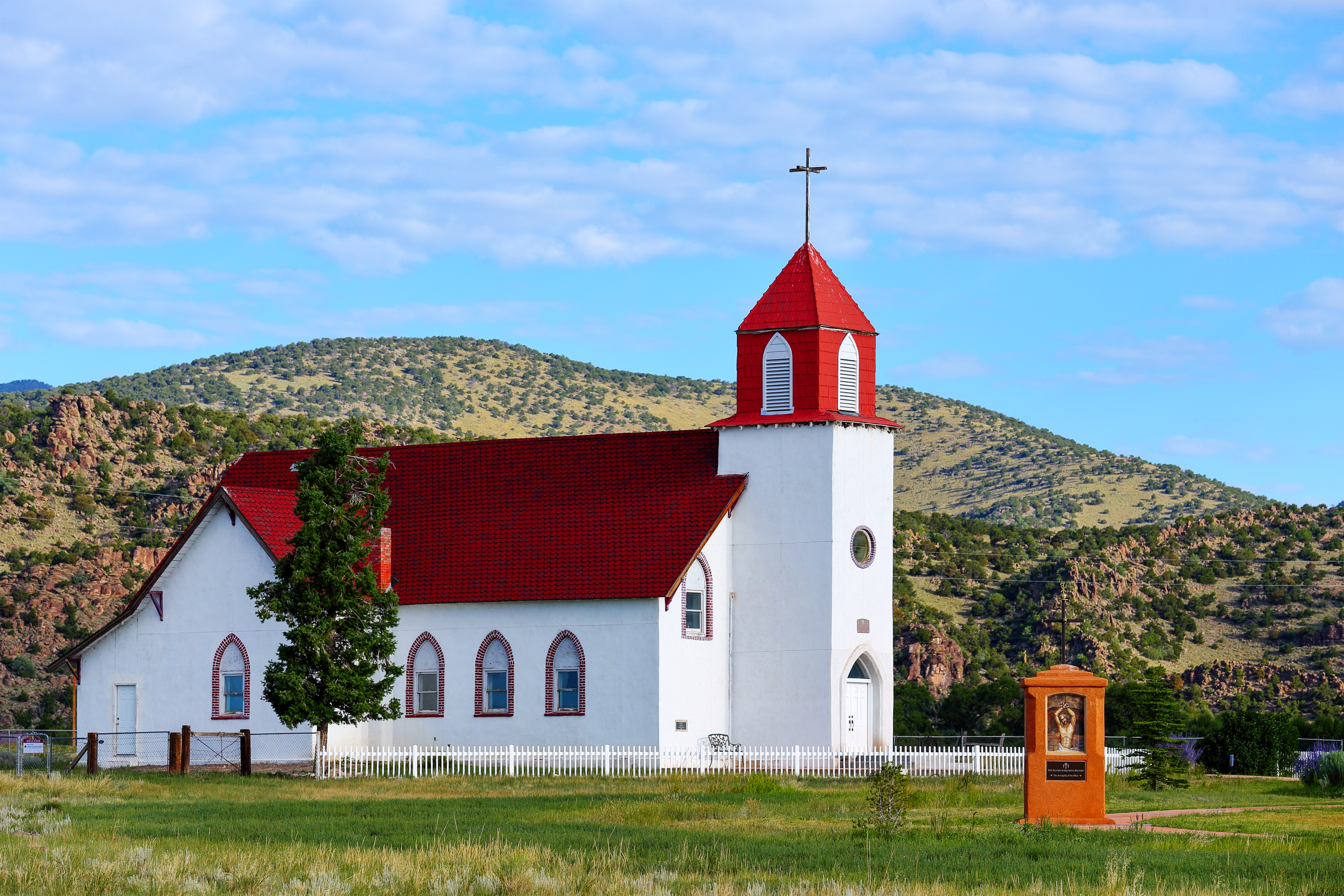
- The Chapel of St. John the Baptist

- Location within Colorado Location within the United States
- Nearest city: La Garita, Colorado
- Coordinates: 37.84662°N 106.26054°W
- Area: 10 acres (4.0 ha)
- Built: 1912
- NRHP reference No.: 80000926
- Added to NRHP: February 8, 1980

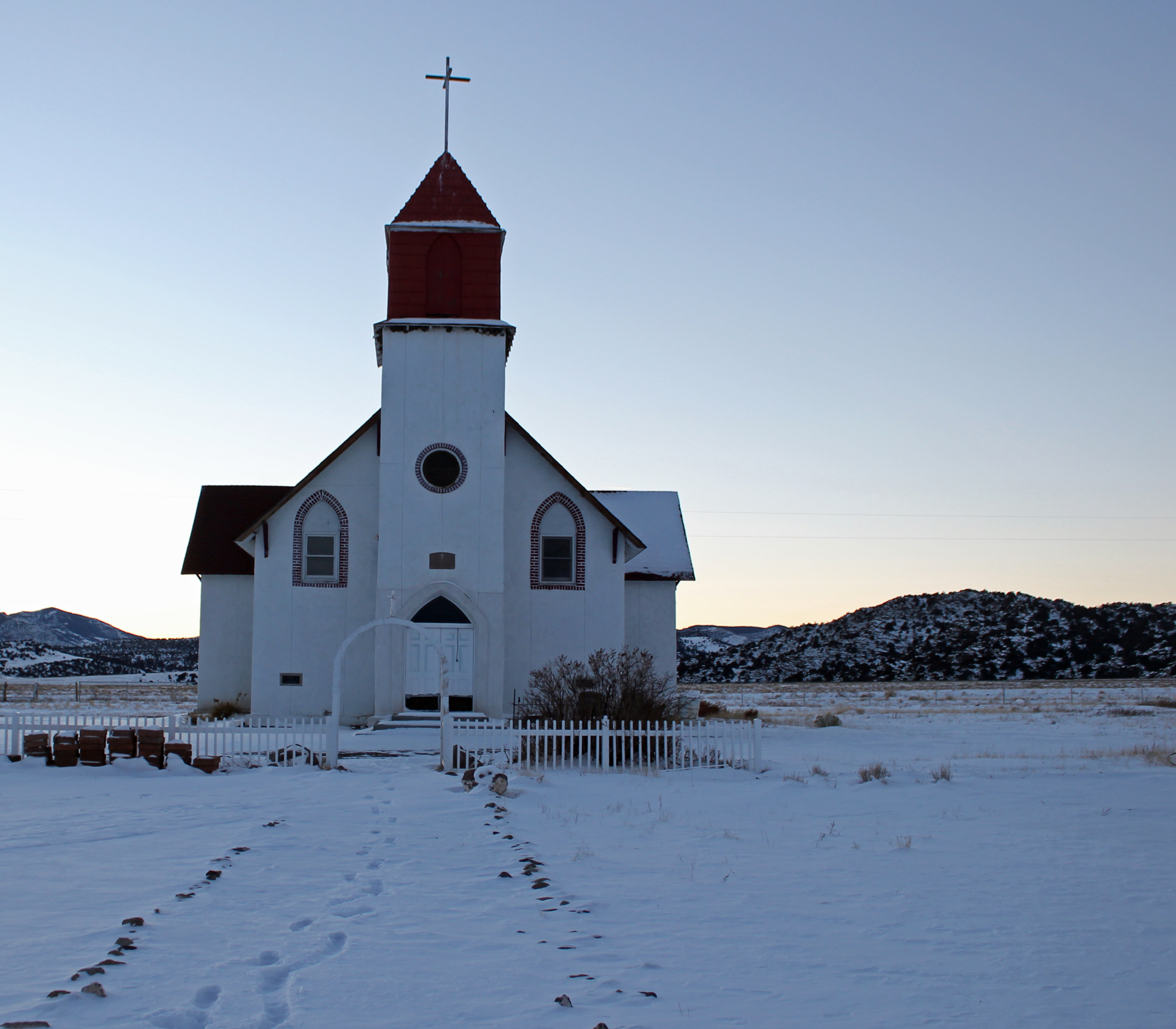
The chapel in winter.

Capilla de San Juan Bautista (English: The Chapel of Saint John the Baptist) is a historic church in La Garita, Colorado.

The structure was completed in 1923, and replaces an earlier church that was burned down. The church was added to the National Register in 1980.
