= San Luis Peak =

Mountain in the state of Colorado

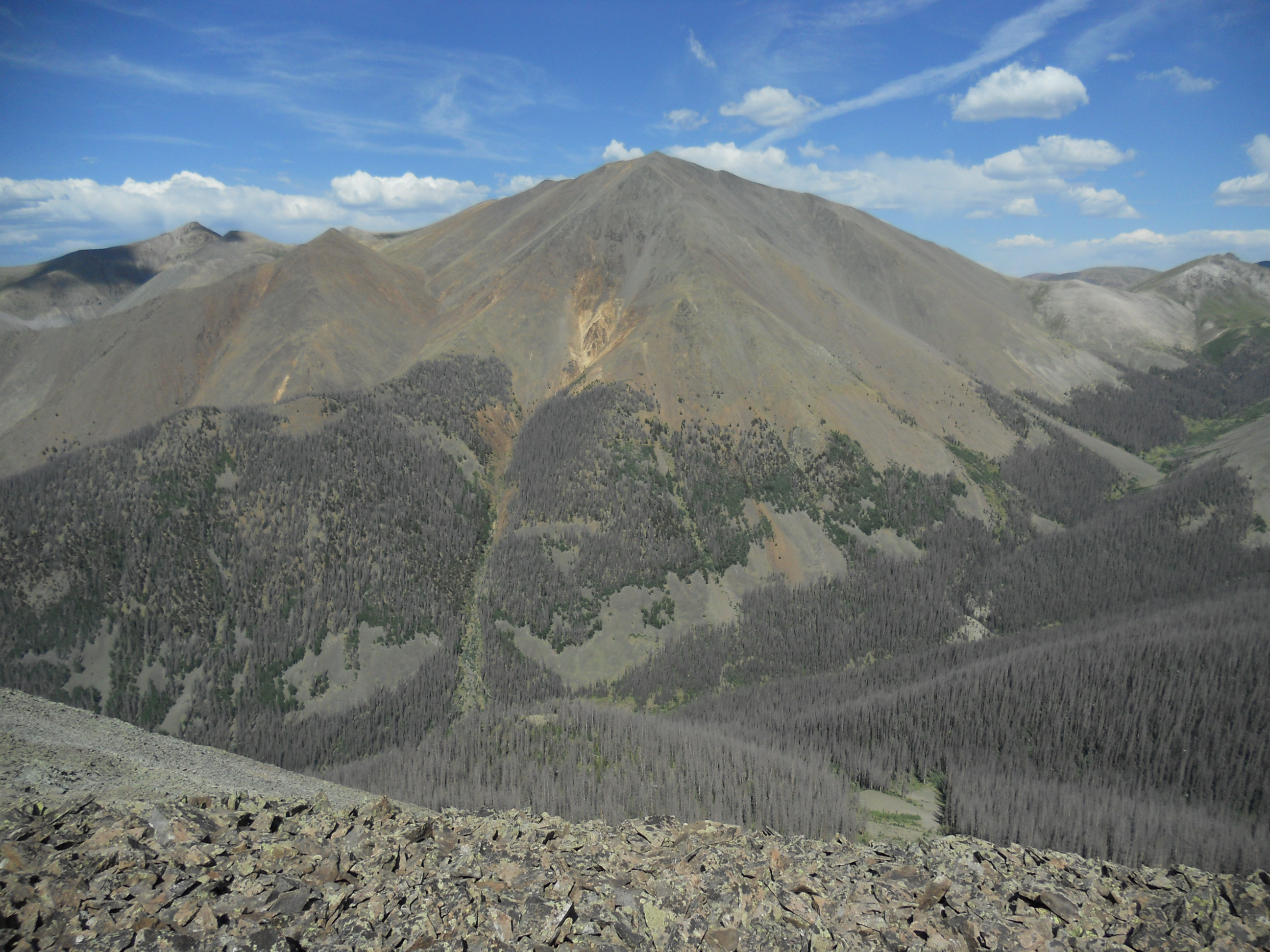
- San Luis Peak viewed from the west

Highest point
- Elevation: 14,020.2 ft (4,273.4 m); NAPGD2022
- Prominence: 3113 ft (949 m)
- Isolation: 26.9 mi (43.4 km)
- Listing: North America highest peaks 58th; US highest major peaks 44th; Colorado highest major peaks 24th; Colorado fourteeners 49th
- Coordinates: 37°59′12″N 106°55′53″W

Geography
- Location within Colorado
- Location: Saguache County, Colorado, United States
- Parent range: San Juan Mountains, Rocky Mountains
- Topo map(s): USGS 7.5' topographic map San Luis Peak, Colorado

Climbing
- First ascent: 1874 by Franklin Rhoda and A. D. Wilson
- Easiest route: Northeast Ridge: Hike, class 1

San Luis Peak is a high summit in the San Juan Mountains, a range in the Rocky Mountains of North America. The prominent 14,020-foot (4273.36 m) fourteener is located in the Gunnison National Forest portion of the La Garita Wilderness in Saguache County approximately 10 miles (16 km) north of Creede. It is situated rather far to the east of the other fourteeners in the San Juans, and has more of a wilderness setting than many of the others.

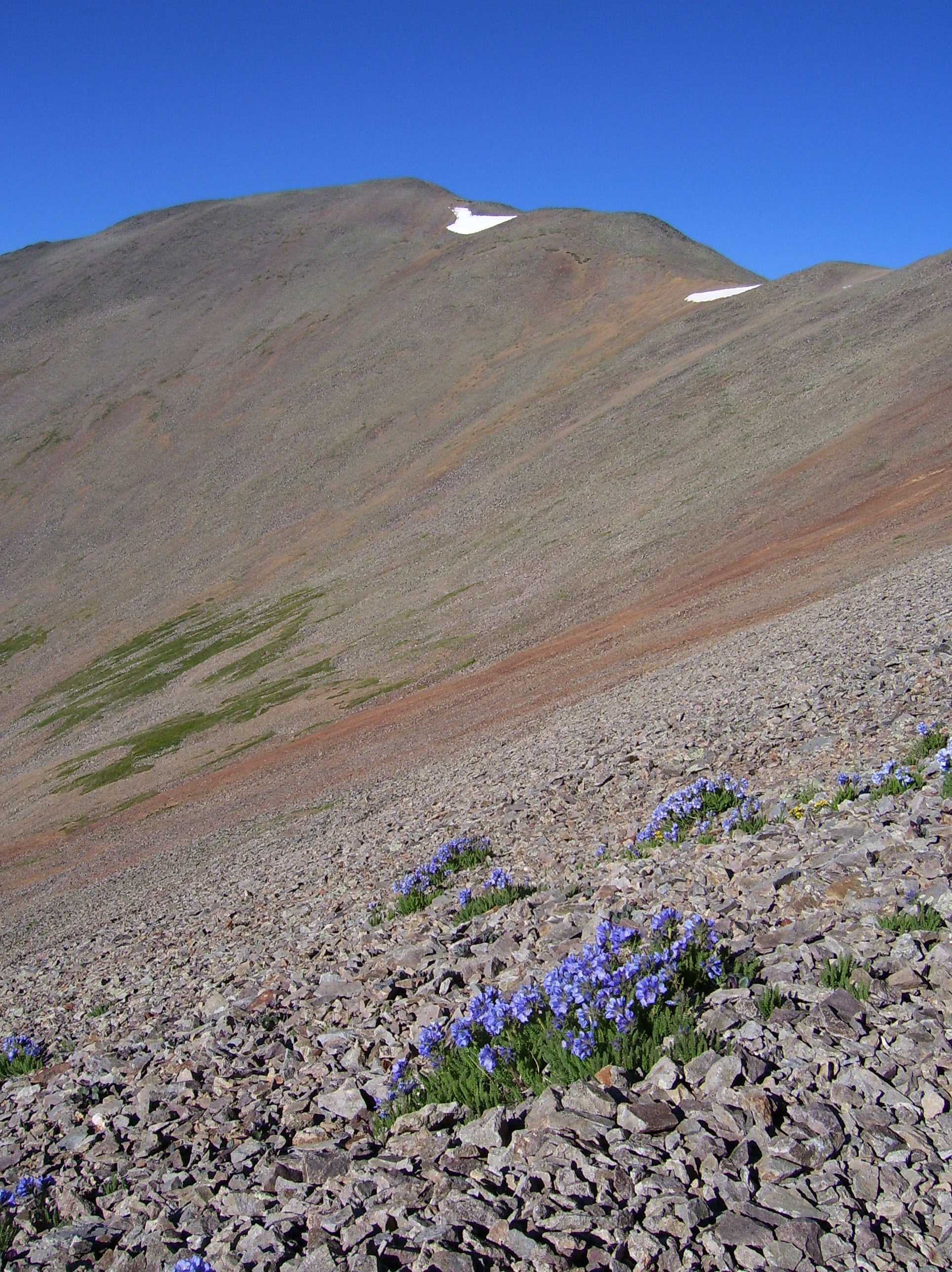
San Luis Peak viewed from the Northeast Ridge route

San Luis Peak is a relatively straightforward climb, with two hiking routes to the summit. The Northeast Ridge route begins at the Stewart Creek Trailhead and is 13.5 mi (21.7 km) round trip. The South Ridge route begins at the West Willow Creek Trailhead north of Creede. This route is almost entirely above treeline and is 12.3 mi (19.8 km) round trip.

== See also ==
- List of mountain peaks of North America
  - List of mountain peaks of the United States
    - List of mountain peaks of Colorado
      - List of Colorado fourteeners
