= La Garita Wilderness =

Protected area in southwestern Colorado, US

- IUCN category Ib (wilderness area)
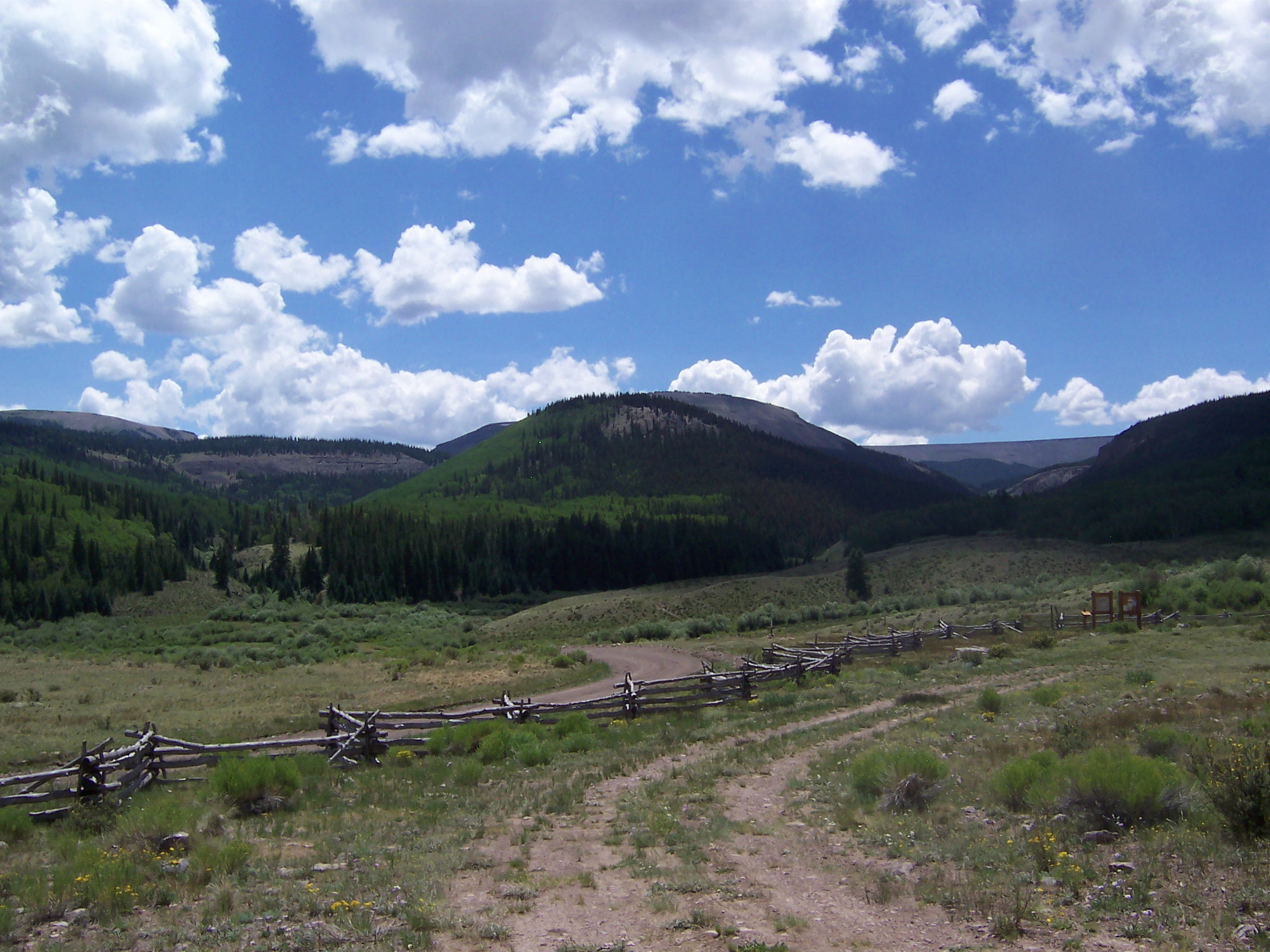
- View of the La Garita Wilderness area from the parking lot at the terminus of Forest Road 787

- Location within the United States
- Location: Hinsdale / Saguache / Mineral counties, Colorado, United States
- Nearest city: Monte Vista, CO
- Coordinates: 38°00′N 106°53′W
- Area: 129,626 acres (524.58 km^{2})
- Established: 1964
- Governing body: U.S. Forest Service

The La Garita Wilderness is a U.S. Wilderness Area located in the La Garita Mountains of southern Colorado. The 129,626-acre (524.58 km^{2}) wilderness established in 1964 in Gunnison and Rio Grande National Forests includes segments of the Colorado Trail and the Continental Divide Trail. At 14,014 feet (4,271 m), San Luis Peak is the highest point in the wilderness area.

One entrance to the wilderness area is via Forest Road 787 from Saguache Park and Cochetopa Park off State Highway 114 west of Saguache, Colorado. There is a parking lot for visitors to the wilderness area at the south end of FS 787. Cochetopa Park may also be entered from the east over Cochetopa Pass via Saguache County Road NN14.

== Climate ==
La Garita Peak, 13,710 ft (4,179 m), is the eponymous peak of the La Garita Wilderness and the La Garita Mountains. La Garita Peak has an Alpine climate (Köppen ET). There is no weather station at the summit, but this climate table contains interpolated data for an area around the summit.

Climate data for La Garita Peak 37.9342 N, 106.8651 W, Elevation: 13,579 ft (4,139 m) (1991–2020 normals)
Month	Jan	Feb	Mar	Apr	May	Jun	Jul	Aug	Sep	Oct	Nov	Dec	Year
Mean daily maximum °F (°C)	23.6 (−4.7)	23.1 (−4.9)	28.0 (−2.2)	33.2 (0.7)	41.7 (5.4)	53.1 (11.7)	58.1 (14.5)	55.8 (13.2)	50.1 (10.1)	40.4 (4.7)	30.2 (−1.0)	23.8 (−4.6)	38.4 (3.6)
Daily mean °F (°C)	11.9 (−11.2)	11.1 (−11.6)	15.5 (−9.2)	20.4 (−6.4)	29.1 (−1.6)	39.6 (4.2)	44.7 (7.1)	43.1 (6.2)	37.4 (3.0)	28.1 (−2.2)	18.9 (−7.3)	12.4 (−10.9)	26.0 (−3.3)
Mean daily minimum °F (°C)	0.1 (−17.7)	−0.8 (−18.2)	3.1 (−16.1)	7.7 (−13.5)	16.4 (−8.7)	26.0 (−3.3)	31.4 (−0.3)	30.4 (−0.9)	24.8 (−4.0)	15.8 (−9.0)	7.7 (−13.5)	1.0 (−17.2)	13.6 (−10.2)
Average precipitation inches (mm)	2.36 (60)	2.77 (70)	3.24 (82)	3.12 (79)	2.24 (57)	1.11 (28)	3.73 (95)	4.23 (107)	3.97 (101)	3.32 (84)	2.95 (75)	2.79 (71)	35.83 (909)
Source: PRISM Climate Group
