= Moffat, Colorado =

Town in Saguache County, Colorado, United States

Moffat
- Statutory town
- Town of Moffat, Colorado
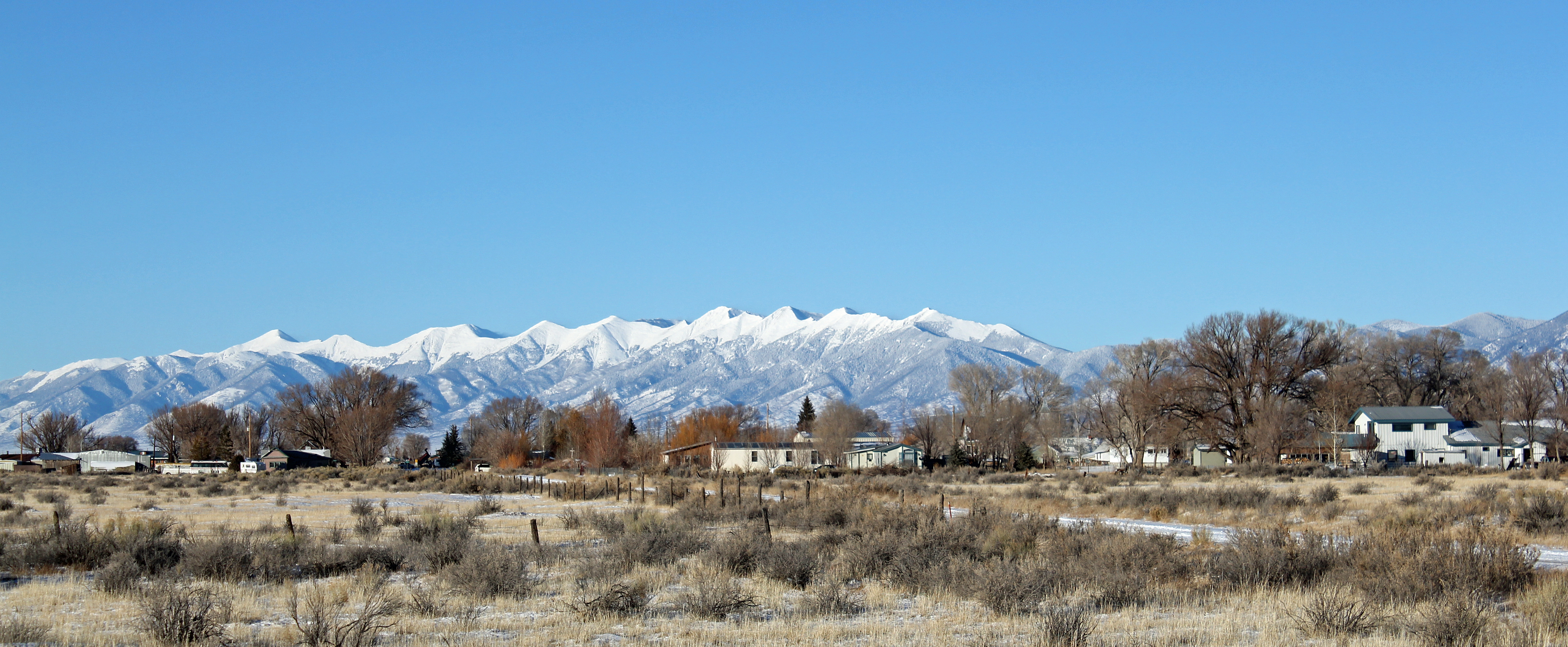
- A view of the town in winter, December 2012

- Location of Moffat in Saguache County, Colorado.
- Coordinates: 37°59′56″N 105°54′20″W
- Country: United States
- State: Colorado
- County: Saguache
- Incorporated (town): 1911

Government
  - Type: Statutory town

Area
  - Total: 1.66 sq mi (4.31 km^{2})
  - Land: 1.66 sq mi (4.31 km^{2})
  - Water: 0 sq mi (0.00 km^{2})
- Elevation: 7,566 ft (2,306 m)

Population (2020)
  - Total: 108
  - Density: 64.9/sq mi (25.1/km^{2})
- Time zone: UTC-7 (Mountain (MST))
  - Summer (DST): UTC-6 (MDT)
- ZIP code: 81143
- Area code: 719
- FIPS code: 08-51250
- GNIS feature ID: 2413006
- Website: www.townofmoffatco.gov

The Town of Moffat is a statutory town in Saguache County, Colorado, United States. The town population was 108 at the 2020 United States census.

== Geography ==
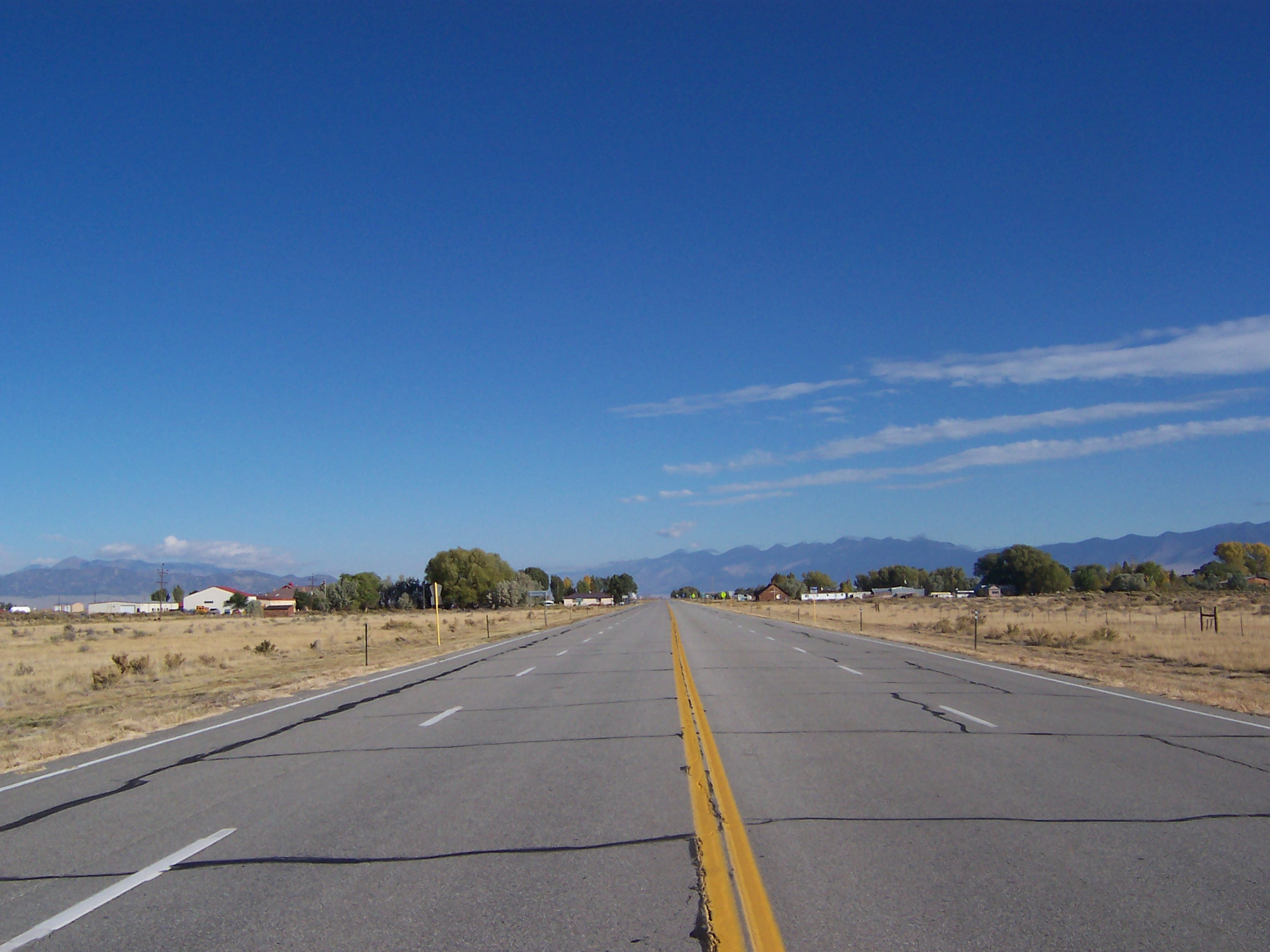
State Highway 17 looking north toward Moffat, October 2010

According to the United States Census Bureau, the town has a total area of 1.4 square miles (3.6 km^{2}), all of it land.

== History ==
Moffat was established in 1890 by the San Luis Town and Improvement Company and initially attracted many settlers. It was a major cattle-shipping point on the narrow gauge Denver and Rio Grande Western Railroad.

The town was named after David H. Moffat, a railroad official.

== Demographics ==
Historical population
Census	Pop.	Note	%±
1940	149		—
1950	109		−26.8%
1960	104		−4.6%
1970	98		−5.8%
1980	105		7.1%
1990	99		−5.7%
2000	114		15.2%
2010	116		1.8%
2020	108		−6.9%

As of the census of 2000, there were 114 people, 54 households, and 30 families residing in the town. The population density was 82.3 inhabitants per square mile (31.8/km^{2}). There were 66 housing units at an average density of 47.7 units per square mile (18.4 units/km^{2}). The racial makeup of the town is 89.47% White, 0.00% African American, 0.88% Native American, 0.88% from other races, and 8.77% from two or more races. Hispanic or Latino of any race were 14.91% of the population.

There were 54 households, out of which 22.2% had children under the age of 18 living with them, 44.4% were married couples living together, 9.3% had a female householder with no husband present, and 44.4% were non-families. 33.3% of all households were made up of individuals, and 11.1% had someone living alone who was 65 years of age or older. The average household size was 2.11 and the average family size was 2.70.

In the town, the population was spread out, with 21.1% under the age of 18, 6.1% from 18 to 24, 22.8% from 25 to 44, 34.2% from 45 to 64, and 15.8% who were 65 years of age or older. The median age was 45 years. For every 100 females, there were 107.3 males. For every 100 females age 18 and over, there were 100.0 males.

The median income for a household in the town was $28,906, and the median income for a family was $28,333. Males had a median income of $14,750 versus $22,083 for females. The per capita income for the town was $14,388. There were 20.0% of families and 25.2% of the population living below the poverty line, including 41.4% of under eighteens and 25.0% of those over 64.

== Transportation ==
Moffat is part of Colorado's Bustang network. It is on the Alamosa-Pueblo Outrider line.

== See also ==
- List of municipalities in Colorado
- San Luis Valley
- Sangre de Cristo Range
