= Alamosa East, Colorado =

Census-designated place in Alamosa County, Colorado, United States

Alamosa East CDP, Colorado
- Census-designated place
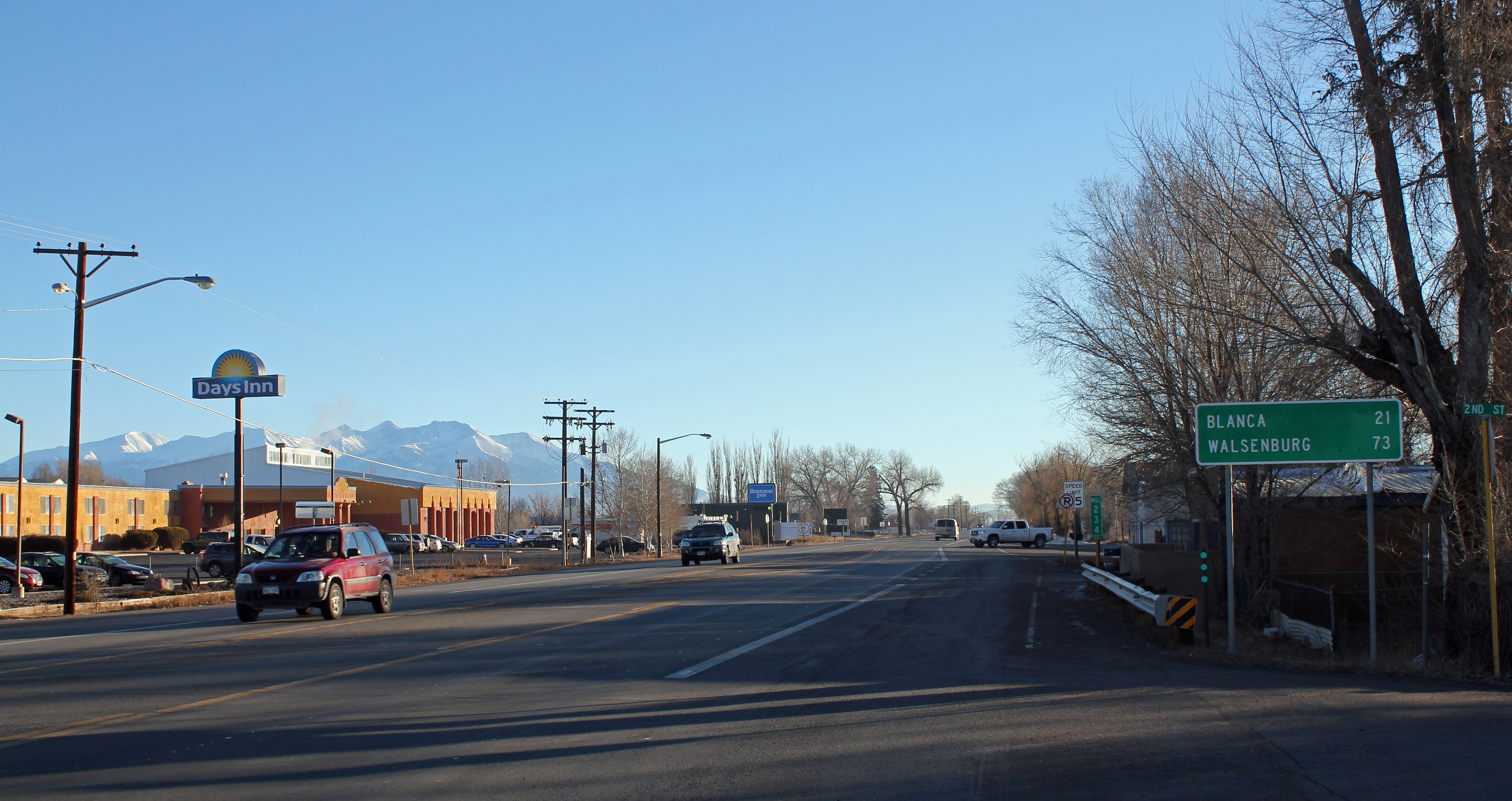
- Looking east along U.S. Route 160 (Santa Fe Avenue) in Alamosa East.

- Location of the Alamosa East CDP in Alamosa County, Colorado
- Coordinates: 37°28′36″N 105°50′23″W
- Country: United States
- State: Colorado
- County: Alamosa

Government
  - Type: Unincorporated community
  - Body: Alamosa County

Area
  - Total: 3.249 sq mi (8.414 km^{2})
  - Land: 3.249 sq mi (8.414 km^{2})
  - Water: 0 sq mi (0.000 km^{2})
- Elevation: 7,540 ft (2,300 m)

Population (2020)
  - Total: 1,453
  - Density: 447.3/sq mi (172.7/km^{2})
- Time zone: UTC−07:00 (MST)
  - Summer (DST): UTC−06:00 (MDT)
- ZIP Code: 81101
- Area code: 719
- GNIS CDP ID: 2407709
- FIPS code: 08-01145

Alamosa East is an unincorporated community and a census-designated place (CDP) located in and governed by Alamosa County, Colorado, United States. The population of the Alamosa East CDP was 1,453 at the 2020 United States census. The Alamosa post office (Zip code 81101) serves the area.

== Geography ==
The Alamosa East CDP has an area of 2,079 acres (8.414 km^{2}), all land.

== Demographics ==
Alamosa East CDP, Colorado
Year	Pop.	±%
1970	1,040	—
1980	1,175	+13.0%
1990	1,389	+18.2%
2000	1,528	+10.0%
2010	1,458	−4.6%
2020	1,453	−0.3%
Source: United States Census Bureau

=== 2020 census ===
As of the 2020 census, Alamosa East had a population of 1,453. The median age was 40.1 years. 24.6% of residents were under the age of 18 and 16.2% of residents were 65 years of age or older. For every 100 females there were 99.6 males, and for every 100 females age 18 and over there were 96.6 males age 18 and over.

72.3% of residents lived in urban areas, while 27.7% lived in rural areas.

There were 576 households in Alamosa East, of which 29.2% had children under the age of 18 living in them. Of all households, 46.2% were married-couple households, 21.0% were households with a male householder and no spouse or partner present, and 26.4% were households with a female householder and no spouse or partner present. About 28.8% of all households were made up of individuals and 11.9% had someone living alone who was 65 years of age or older.

There were 617 housing units, of which 6.6% were vacant. The homeowner vacancy rate was 1.3% and the rental vacancy rate was 4.6%.

Racial composition as of the 2020 census
Race	Number	Percent
White	843	58.0%
Black or African American	9	0.6%
American Indian and Alaska Native	58	4.0%
Asian	12	0.8%
Native Hawaiian and Other Pacific Islander	0	0.0%
Some other race	247	17.0%
Two or more races	284	19.5%
Hispanic or Latino (of any race)	762	52.4%

The United States Census Bureau initially defined the Alamosa East CDP for the 1970 United States census.

== See also ==
- List of census-designated places in Colorado
- Great Sand Dunes National Park and Preserve
- Mount Blanca
- San Luis Valley
