= La Garita, Colorado =

Unincorporated community in Saguache County, CO, USA

Coordinates: 37°50′27″N 106°14′48″W

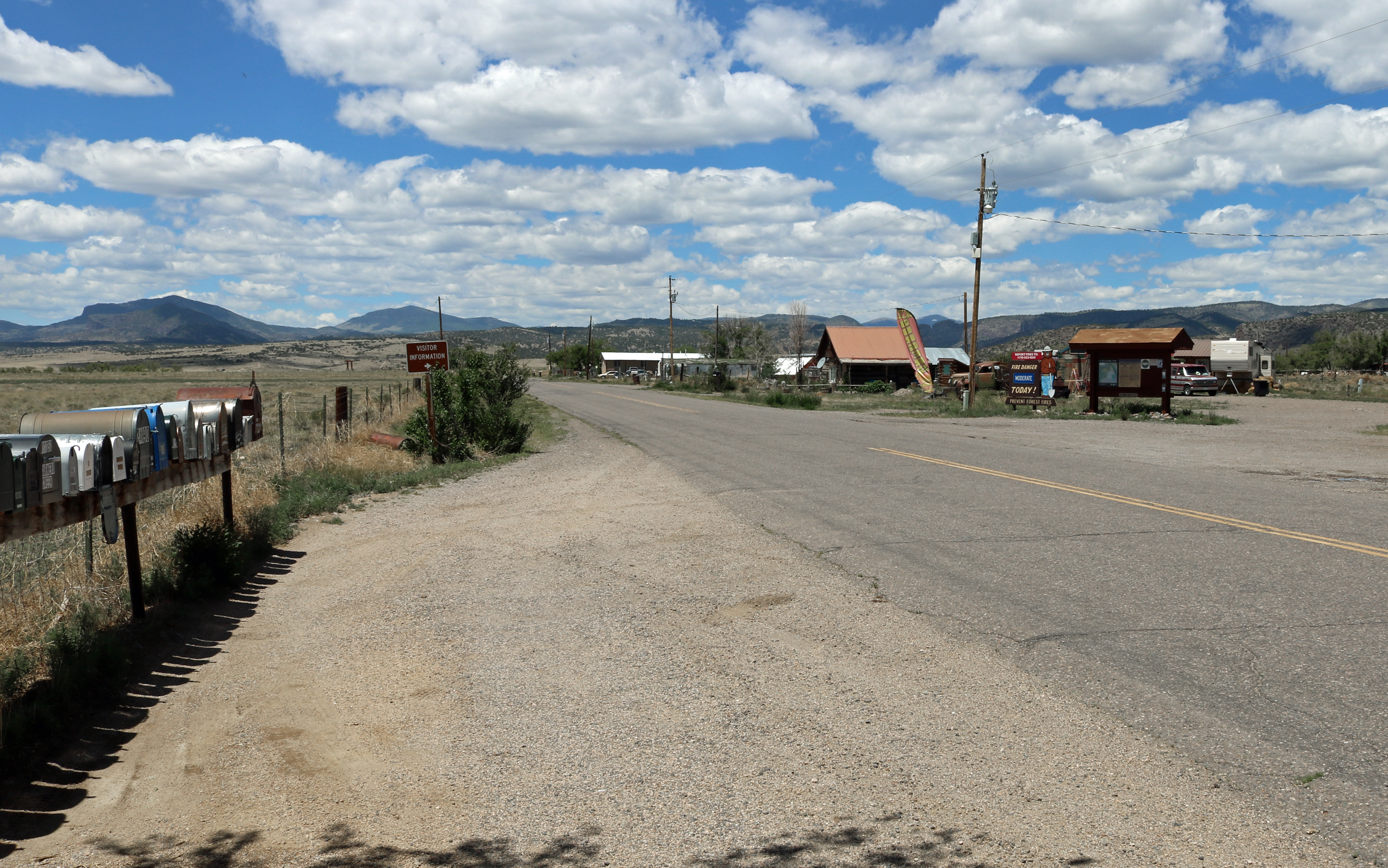
La Garita in 2023

La Garita is an unincorporated community in Saguache County, in the U.S. state of Colorado.

== History ==
A post office called La Garita operated intermittently from 1874 until 1972. The community takes its name from the nearby La Garita Mountains.
