= Crestone School =

- U.S. National Register of Historic Places
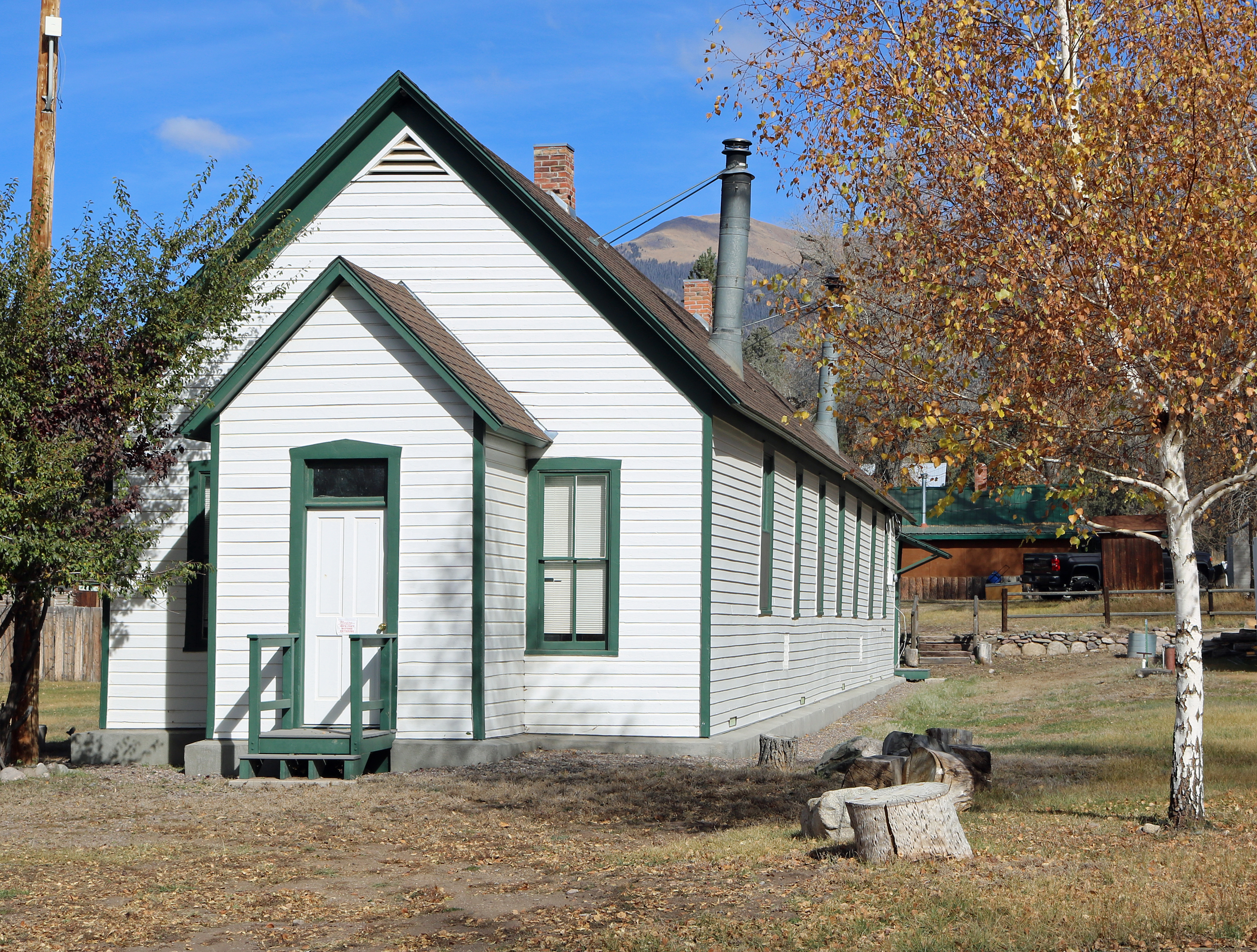

- Location within Colorado
- Location: Cottonwood St. and Carbonate Ave., Crestone, Colorado
- Coordinates: 37°59′48″N 105°41′57″W
- Area: 0.4 acres (0.16 ha)
- Built: c. 1880, 1901
- MPS: Rural School Buildings in Colorado MPS
- NRHP reference No.: 86000011
- Added to NRHP: January 9, 1986

The Crestone School, also known as the Crestone Community Building, at Cottonwood St. and Carbonate Ave. in Crestone, Colorado, was built in 1880 and was listed on the National Register of Historic Places in 1986.

It is a one-story two-classroom front-gabled building. It is unusual among historic schools of Colorado in its length: it is 88 feet (27 m) long, with seven bays on each side. The front, original section, built in the 1880s is 38 by 20 feet (11.6 m × 6.1 m) in plan; the rear section was built in 1901 and includes a room which became a kitchen.

The school's bell is a contributing object in the listing. It was cast by C.B. Bell Company of Hillsboro, Ohio in 1912. It hung in a wooden tower which eventually deteriorated. The bell was placed, in 1976, upon a pyramid of "Crestone Conglomerate Rock" as part of Crestone's Centennial Celebration.

A small/shed-roof woodshed at the north rear of the building and was built before 1935; it and two c. 1910 frame outhouses were deemed contributing buildings in the listing.
