= Saguache Downtown Historic District =

Historic district in Colorado, United States

- U.S. National Register of Historic Places
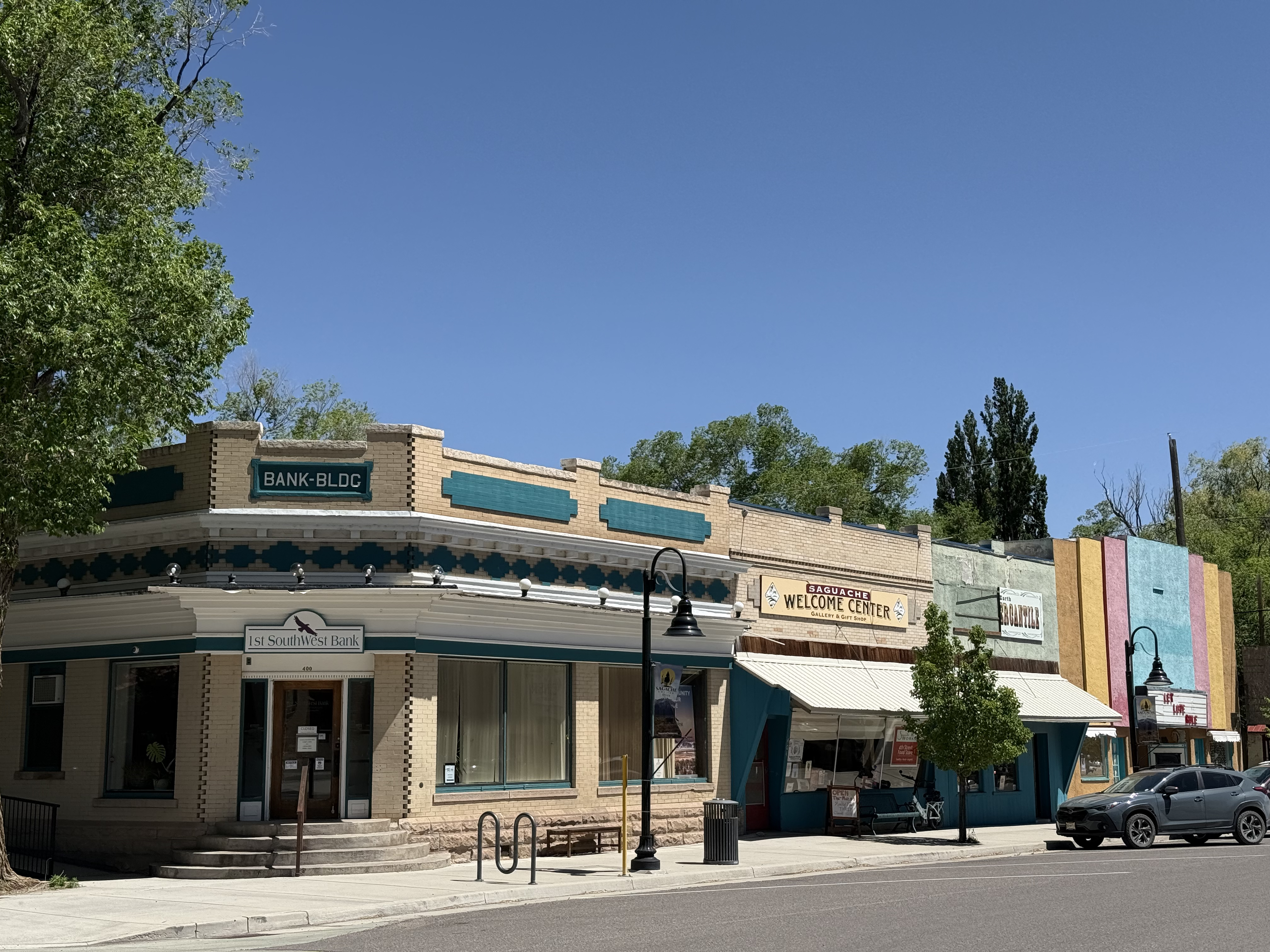

- Location within Colorado
- Location: Roughly 300 & 400 blocks of 4th St., Saguache, Colorado
- Coordinates: 38°05′14″N 106°08′13″W
- Area: 7.7 acres (3.1 ha)
- NRHP reference No.: 14000433
- Added to NRHP: 2014

The Saguache Downtown Historic District, a historic district in Saguache, Colorado, was listed on the National Register of Historic Places in 2014. The listing included 32 contributing buildings and four contributing structures.

It was deemed significant "for its historic role as the commercial center of the Town of Saguache and the upper San Luis Valley since its founding in 1874. The district is further locally significant [for its] intact collection of one- and two-story late nineteenth- and early twentieth century commercial buildings, including an impressive number of buildings featuring false front and adobe construction."
