= Villa Grove, Colorado =

Unincorporated community in Saguache County, CO, USA

- Unincorporated community
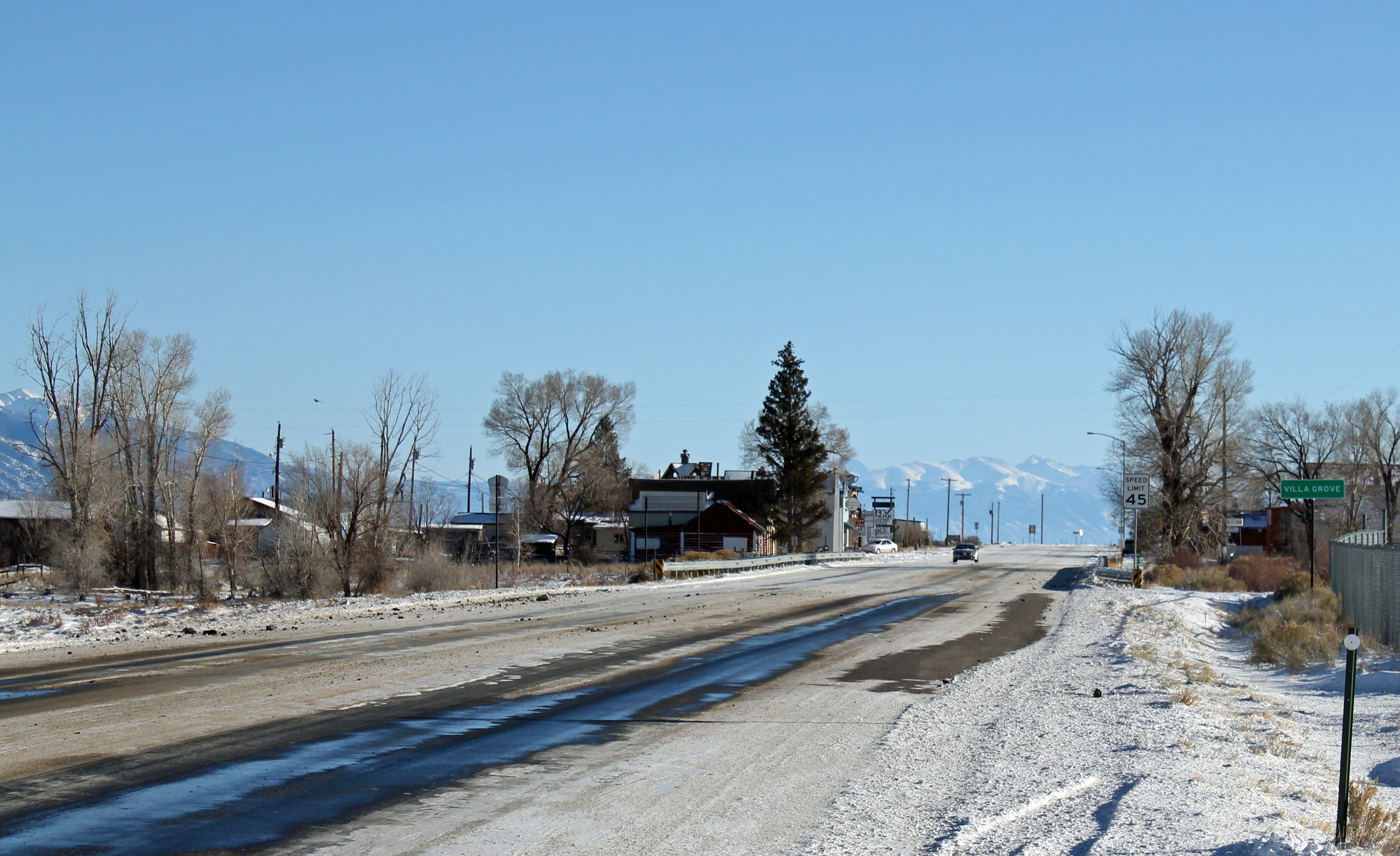
- Villa Grove in winter, December 2012

- Location in Saguache County and the state of Colorado
- Coordinates: 38°14′58″N 105°56′59″W
- Country: United States
- State: Colorado
- County: Saguache County
- Established: 1870
- Elevation: 7,983 ft (2,433 m)
- Time zone: UTC-7 (MST)
  - Summer (DST): UTC-6 (MDT)
- ZIP code: 81155
- GNIS feature ID: 204776

Villa Grove is an unincorporated community and a U.S. Post Office in Saguache County, Colorado, United States. The Villa Grove Post Office has the ZIP Code 81155.

== History ==
The town of Garibaldi was established by the Denver & Rio Grande Railroad in 1870. The town served as the southern terminus of the Rio Grande's narrow-gauge Poncha Pass line from 1870 to 1890. The town was named for Italian revolutionary Giuseppe Garibaldi. The Garibaldi Post Office opened on June 13, 1870. The town's name was changed to the less political Villa Grove on January 19, 1872. The spelling of the town's name was changed to Villagrove on October 12, 1894, and back to Villa Grove on July 1, 1950.
