= Conejos River =

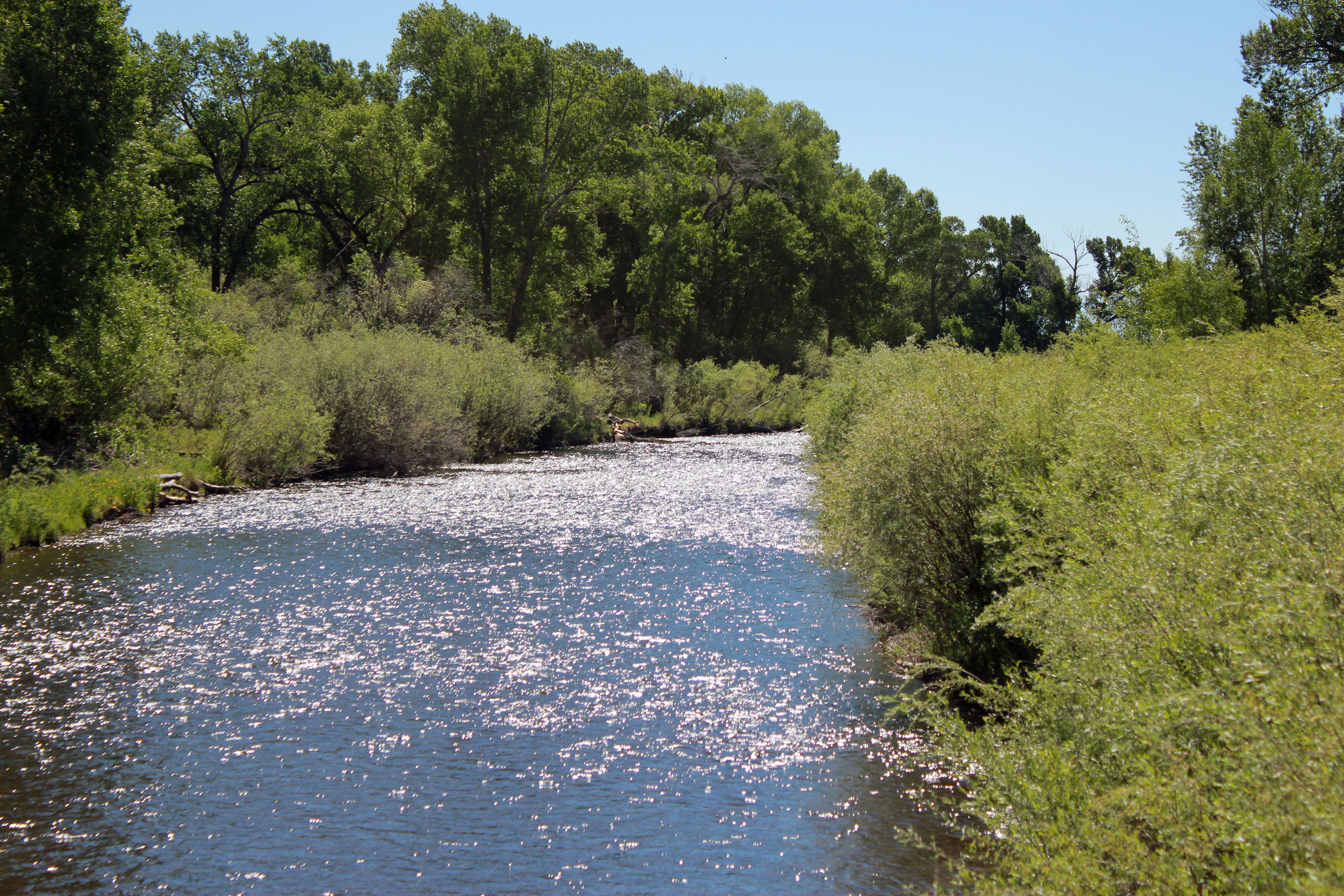
- The river north of Antonito, Colorado.

- Location of the mouth of the Conejos River in Colorado

Location
- Country: United States
- State: Colorado
- County: Conejos

Physical characteristics
- Source: San Juan Mountains
  - coordinates: 37°16′34″N 106°37′27″W
- Mouth: Rio Grande
  - location: San Luis Valley
  - coordinates: 37°18′14″N 105°44′9″W
- Length: 92.5 mi (148.9 km)
- Basin size: 887 sq mi (2,300 km^{2})
- Discharge
  - location: USGS gage 08249000 1 mile above mouth
  - average: 176 cu ft/s (5.0 m^{3}/s)
  - minimum: 0 cu ft/s (0 m^{3}/s)
  - maximum: 3,820 cu ft/s (108 m^{3}/s)

Basin features
- Progression: Rio Grande
- Tributaries
  - left: North Fork Conejos River; Adams Fork Conejos River; Coal Creek; Rito Gato; Beaver Lake Creek; Trail Creek; Valdez Creek; Fox Creek
  - right: Middle Fork Conejos River; El Rito Azul; Lake Fork; Saddle Creek; South Fork Conejos River; Rough Creek; Elk Creek; Sheep Creek; Bighorn Creek; Rio San Antonio
- Anabranch: North Branch Conejos River

The Conejos River is a tributary of the Rio Grande, approximately 92.5 miles (148.9 km) long, in south-central Colorado in the United States. It drains a scenic area of the eastern San Juan Mountains west of the San Luis Valley.

== Description ==
It rises from snowmelt along the continental divide west of Conejos Peak in western Conejos County, approximately 15 miles (24 km) northeast of Pagosa Springs. It flows briefly northeast, through Platoro Reservoir, then southeast through the Rio Grande National Forest, then east along the New Mexico border through a scenic canyon. It enters the southwestern corner of the San Luis Valley from the west near Conejos and joins the Rio Grande from the west approximately 15 mi (24 km) southeast of Alamosa. It is impounded at Platoro Reservoir for flood control and to manage irrigation in the San Luis Valley, as part of the San Luis Valley Project of the U.S. Bureau of Reclamation.

The river is wide and shallow along much of its course. It descends steeply in several areas, including Pinnacle Canyon, a popular destination for whitewater rafting.

Off-limits to white settlement during the New Spain years, the river was the site of early land grants to settlers from the government of Mexico in the 1830s. The first settlement of 50 families along the river, in the Guadalupe Grant in 1833, was destroyed in an attack by Native Americans. José Jacques established the first white settlement on the river in 1851. The town of Conejos was founded in 1854 by Lafayette Head, who later became the first lieutenant governor of Colorado.

== See also ==
- List of Colorado rivers
- List of tributaries of the Rio Grande
