= Saguache County, Colorado =

County in Colorado, United States

- County
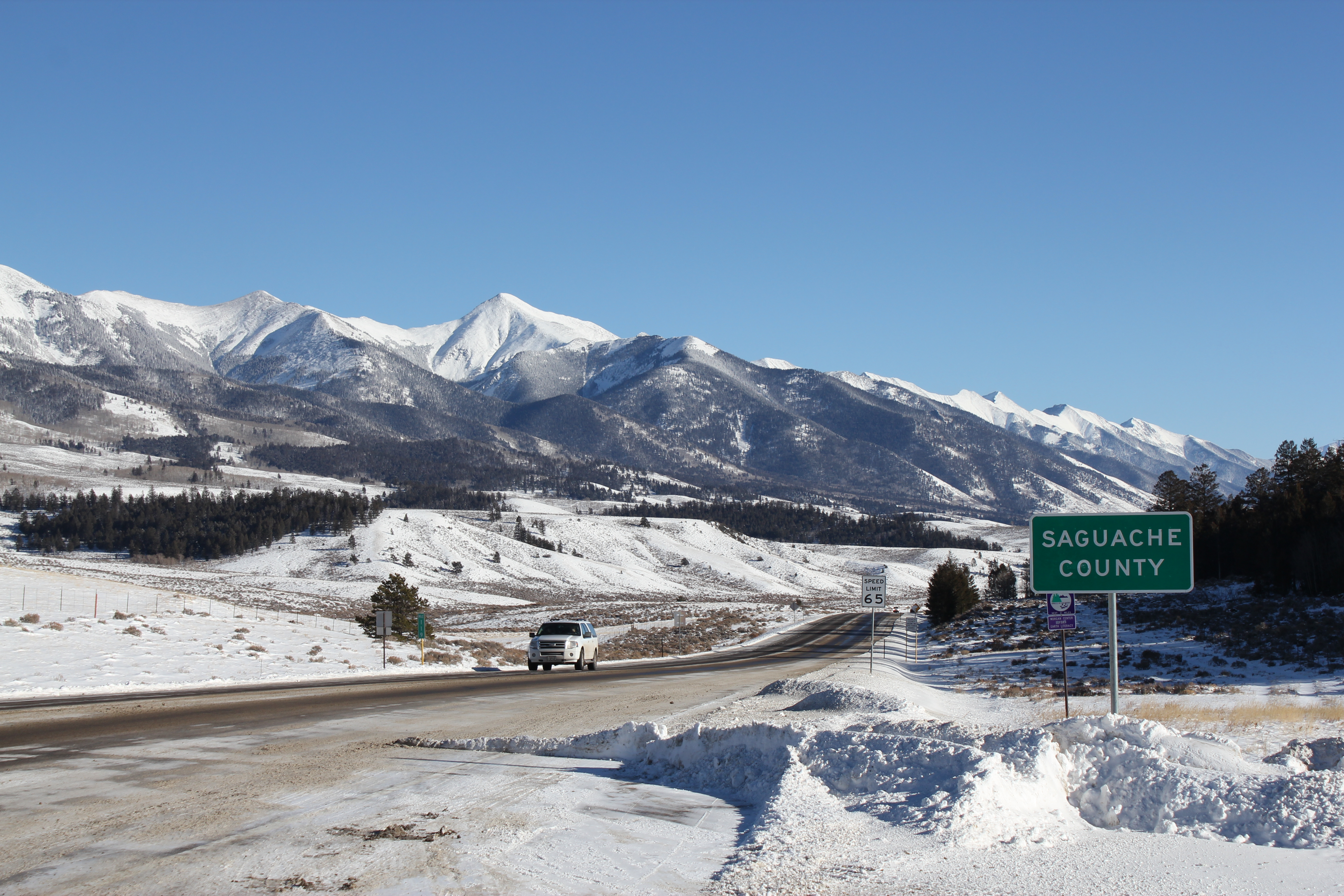
- Entering Saguache County from the north on U.S. 285

- Seal

- Location within the U.S. state of Colorado
- Coordinates: 38.08°N 106.30°W
- Country: United States
- State: Colorado
- Founded: December 29, 1866
- Seat: Saguache
- Largest town: Center

Area
  - Total: 3,170 sq mi (8,200 km^{2})
  - Land: 3,169 sq mi (8,210 km^{2})
  - Water: 1.7 sq mi (4.4 km^{2}) 0.05%

Population (2020)
  - Total: 6,368
  - Estimate (2025): 6,732 ▲
  - Density: 2/sq mi (0.77/km^{2})
- Time zone: UTC−7 (Mountain)
  - Summer (DST): UTC−6 (MDT)
- Congressional district: 3rd
- Website: saguachecounty.colorado.gov

Saguache County (suh-WATCH /səˈwɑːtʃ/) is a county located in the U.S. state of Colorado. (Note: The name "Saguache" is pronounced /səˈwætʃ/. This name comes from the Ute language noun "sawup" /səˈwʌp/ meaning "sand dunes". The Spanish language version of this name is usually spelled "Saguache", while the English language version is usually spelled "Sawatch".) As of the 2020 census, the population was 6,368. The county seat is Saguache.

== History ==
Saguache County was formed December 29, 1866, in the Territory of Colorado when it was extracted from the northern half of Costilla County. A partition from Lake County on February 9, 1872, added the northwest section of the present-day county.

== Geography ==
According to the U.S. Census Bureau, the county has a total area of 3,170 square miles (8,200 km^{2}), of which 3,169 square miles (8,210 km^{2}) is land and 1.7 square miles (4.4 km^{2}) (0.05%) is water. It is the 7th largest of Colorado's 64 counties.

=== Adjacent counties ===
- Chaffee County - north
- Fremont County - northeast
- Custer County - east
- Huerfano County - southeast
- Rio Grande County - south
- Alamosa County - south
- Mineral County - southwest
- Hinsdale County - southwest
- Gunnison County - northwest

=== Major highways ===
- U.S. Highway 285
- State Highway 17
- State Highway 112
- State Highway 114

=== National protected areas ===
- Great Sand Dunes National Park and Preserve
- Great Sand Dunes Wilderness
- Gunnison National Forest
- La Garita Wilderness
- Rio Grande National Forest
- Sangre de Cristo Wilderness

=== Trails and byways ===
- Colorado Trail
- Continental Divide National Scenic Trail
- Great Parks Bicycle Route
- Liberty Road historic mail route open to foot, horse, and bicycle travel between Crestone and the ghost towns of Duncan and Liberty crossing the Baca Mountain Tract Rio Grande National Forest.
- Medano Pass Primitive Road
- Montville Nature Trail
- Mosca Pass Trail
- Old Spanish National Historic Trail
- Sand Ramp Trail, a hiking trail within the Great Sand Dunes National Park and Preserve which skirts the east and north of the dune field.
- Western Express Bicycle Route

== Demographics ==
Historical population
Census	Pop.	Note	%±
1870	304		—
1880	1,973		549.0%
1890	3,313		67.9%
1900	3,853		16.3%
1910	4,160		8.0%
1920	4,638		11.5%
1930	6,250		34.8%
1940	6,173		−1.2%
1950	5,664		−8.2%
1960	4,473		−21.0%
1970	3,827		−14.4%
1980	3,935		2.8%
1990	4,619		17.4%
2000	5,917		28.1%
2010	6,108		3.2%
2020	6,368		4.3%
2025 (est.)	6,732	▲	5.7%
U.S. Decennial Census; 1790-1960 1900-1990; 1990-2000 2010-2020

=== 2020 census ===
As of the 2020 census, the county had a population of 6,368. Of the residents, 20.0% were under the age of 18 and 24.2% were 65 years of age or older; the median age was 47.0 years. For every 100 females there were 104.2 males, and for every 100 females age 18 and over there were 104.7 males. 0.0% of residents lived in urban areas and 100.0% lived in rural areas.

Saguache County, Colorado – Racial and ethnic composition Note: the US Census treats Hispanic/Latino as an ethnic category. This table excludes Latinos from the racial categories and assigns them to a separate category. Hispanics/Latinos may be of any race.
Race / Ethnicity (NH = Non-Hispanic)	Pop 2000	Pop 2010	Pop 2020	% 2000	% 2010	% 2020
White alone (NH)	3,053	3,446	3,578	51.60%	56.42%	56.19%
Black or African American alone (NH)	1	11	19	0.02%	0.18%	0.30%
Native American or Alaska Native alone (NH)	73	68	81	1.23%	1.11%	1.27%
Asian alone (NH)	26	47	63	0.44%	0.77%	0.99%
Pacific Islander alone (NH)	0	1	2	0.00%	0.02%	0.03%
Other race alone (NH)	14	2	42	0.24%	0.03%	0.66%
Mixed race or Multiracial (NH)	72	81	189	1.22%	1.33%	2.97%
Hispanic or Latino (any race)	2,678	2,452	2,394	45.26%	40.14%	37.59%
Total	5,917	6,108	6,368	100.00%	100.00%	100.00%

The racial makeup of the county was 66.1% White, 0.3% Black or African American, 3.0% American Indian and Alaska Native, 1.0% Asian, 0.0% Native Hawaiian and Pacific Islander, 9.2% from some other race, and 20.4% from two or more races. Hispanic or Latino residents of any race comprised 37.6% of the population.

There were 2,835 households in the county, of which 24.2% had children under the age of 18 living with them and 27.2% had a female householder with no spouse or partner present. About 34.0% of all households were made up of individuals and 17.6% had someone living alone who was 65 years of age or older.

There were 3,739 housing units, of which 24.2% were vacant. Among occupied housing units, 70.1% were owner-occupied and 29.9% were renter-occupied. The homeowner vacancy rate was 2.3% and the rental vacancy rate was 10.6%.

=== 2000 census ===
As of the 2000 census, there were 5,917 people, 2,300 households, and 1,557 families living in the county. The population density was 2 people per square mile (0.77 people/km^{2}). There were 3,087 housing units at an average density of 1 units per square mile (0.39 units/km^{2}). The racial makeup of the county was 71.29% White, 0.12% Black or African American, 2.06% Native American, 0.46% Asian, 23.00% from other races, and 3.08% from two or more races. 45.26% of the population were Hispanic or Latino of any race.

There were 2,300 households, out of which 33.40% had children under the age of 18 living with them, 52.70% were married couples living together, 11.00% had a female householder with no husband present, and 32.30% were non-families. 26.90% of all households were made up of individuals, and 7.70% had someone living alone who was 65 years of age or older. The average household size was 2.56 and the average family size was 3.15.

In the county, the population was spread out, with 28.40% under the age of 18, 7.90% from 18 to 24, 26.00% from 25 to 44, 26.90% from 45 to 64, and 10.80% who were 65 years of age or older. The median age was 37 years. For every 100 females there were 101.70 males. For every 100 females age 18 and over, there were 99.70 males.

The median income for a household in the county was $25,495, and the median income for a family was $29,405. Males had a median income of $25,158 versus $18,862 for females. The per capita income for the county was $13,121. About 18.70% of families and 22.60% of the population were below the poverty line, including 27.60% of those under age 18 and 12.50% of those age 65 or over.

== Politics ==
Like many Colorado counties with a strong Hispanic presence, Saguache leans Democratic in Presidential elections. The last Republican to carry the county was Ronald Reagan in 1984.

United States presidential election results for Saguache County, Colorado
Year	Republican		Democratic		Third party(ies)	
Year	No.	%	No.	%	No.	%
1880	509	57.19%	371	41.69%	10	1.12%
1884	543	54.08%	454	45.22%	7	0.70%
1888	592	57.76%	428	41.76%	5	0.49%
1892	326	36.51%	0	0.00%	567	63.49%
1896	176	13.17%	1,155	86.45%	5	0.37%
1900	731	39.84%	1,085	59.13%	19	1.04%
1904	922	56.19%	697	42.47%	22	1.34%
1908	811	49.06%	817	49.43%	25	1.51%
1912	730	36.37%	859	42.80%	418	20.83%
1916	681	34.22%	1,254	63.02%	55	2.76%
1920	1,195	60.32%	717	36.19%	69	3.48%
1924	1,205	58.33%	591	28.61%	270	13.07%
1928	1,491	62.62%	854	35.87%	36	1.51%
1932	931	37.88%	1,427	58.06%	100	4.07%
1936	1,071	43.79%	1,321	54.01%	54	2.21%
1940	1,462	55.57%	1,142	43.41%	27	1.03%
1944	1,204	62.13%	729	37.62%	5	0.26%
1948	914	47.19%	1,009	52.09%	14	0.72%
1952	1,344	65.08%	714	34.58%	7	0.34%
1956	1,149	58.03%	823	41.57%	8	0.40%
1960	956	49.05%	984	50.49%	9	0.46%
1964	622	36.06%	1,099	63.71%	4	0.23%
1968	824	52.45%	648	41.25%	99	6.30%
1972	1,062	63.18%	578	34.38%	41	2.44%
1976	1,094	49.50%	1,059	47.92%	57	2.58%
1980	1,124	52.65%	893	41.83%	118	5.53%
1984	1,201	57.63%	867	41.60%	16	0.77%
1988	945	46.94%	1,033	51.32%	35	1.74%
1992	675	31.05%	1,011	46.50%	488	22.45%
1996	712	36.48%	969	49.64%	271	13.88%
2000	1,078	42.63%	1,145	45.27%	306	12.10%
2004	1,163	41.49%	1,594	56.87%	46	1.64%
2008	956	34.76%	1,730	62.91%	64	2.33%
2012	964	32.88%	1,865	63.61%	103	3.51%
2016	1,147	40.46%	1,417	49.98%	271	9.56%
2020	1,413	41.69%	1,884	55.59%	92	2.71%
2024	1,577	46.37%	1,704	50.10%	120	3.53%

United States Senate election results for Saguache County, Colorado2
Year	Republican		Democratic		Third party(ies)	
Year	No.	%	No.	%	No.	%
2020	1,405	41.58%	1,887	55.84%	87	2.57%

United States Senate election results for Saguache County, Colorado3
Year	Republican		Democratic		Third party(ies)	
Year	No.	%	No.	%	No.	%
2022	1,070	38.61%	1,577	56.91%	124	4.47%

Colorado Gubernatorial election results for Saguache County
Year	Republican		Democratic		Third party(ies)	
Year	No.	%	No.	%	No.	%
2022	1,061	38.36%	1,580	57.12%	125	4.52%

== Communities ==
=== Towns ===
- Bonanza
- Center
- Crestone
- Moffat
- Saguache

=== Unincorporated communities ===
- Alder
- Duncan
- La Garita
- Mineral Hot Springs
- Sargents
- Villa Grove

== National Register of Historic Places ==
Saguache County has nine locations listed in the National Register of Historic Places.

== See also ==
- Baca land grants
- Bibliography of Colorado
- Geography of Colorado
- History of Colorado
  - National Register of Historic Places listings in Saguache County, Colorado
- Index of Colorado-related articles
- List of Colorado-related lists
  - List of counties in Colorado
- Outline of Colorado
