= National Register of Historic Places listings in Rio Grande County, Colorado =

Location of Rio Grande County in Colorado

This is a list of the National Register of Historic Places listings in Rio Grande County, Colorado.

This is intended to be a complete list of the properties and districts on the National Register of Historic Places in Rio Grande County, Colorado, United States. The locations of National Register properties and districts for which the latitude and longitude coordinates are included below, may be seen in a map.

There are 13 properties and districts listed on the National Register in the county. Another property was once listed but has been removed.

This National Park Service list is complete through NPS recent listings posted March 21, 2025.

== Current listings ==
	Name on the Register	Image	Date listed	Location	City or town	Description
1	Carnegie Library	Carnegie Library	April 14, 1995 (#95000439)	120 Jefferson St. 37°34′48″N 106°08′40″W	Monte Vista	
2	Central School Auditorium and Gymnasium	Central School Auditorium and Gymnasium	March 14, 1996 (#96000274)	612 1st Ave. 37°34′46″N 106°08′59″W	Monte Vista	
3	Creede Branch, Denver and Rio Grande Railroad	Creede Branch, Denver and Rio Grande Railroad	November 27, 2002 (#02001408)	Along the D&RGW right-of-way between South Fork and Creede; 37°44′46″N 106°22′13″W	South Fork	
4	Denver & Rio Grande Railroad South Fork Water Tank	Denver & Rio Grande Railroad South Fork Water Tank	October 15, 2002 (#02001132)	U.S. Route 160; 37°40′18″N 106°37′31″W	South Fork	
5	El Monte Hotel	El Monte Hotel	June 7, 1990 (#90000870)	925 1st Ave. 37°34′50″N 106°08′43″W	Monte Vista	
6	First Methodist Episcopal Church	First Methodist Episcopal Church	October 11, 2003 (#03001011)	215 Washington St. 37°34′44″N 106°08′52″W	Monte Vista	
7	Keck Homestead		May 8, 1998 (#98000437)	12888 County Road 15; 37°42′00″N 106°26′03″W	Del Norte	
8	Monte Vista Downtown Historic District	Monte Vista Downtown Historic District	November 1, 1991 (#91001612)	Junction of 1st Ave. and Washington St. 37°34′50″N 106°08′51″W	Monte Vista	
9	Monte Vista Library	Monte Vista Library	June 30, 1995 (#95000782)	110 Jefferson St. 37°34′48″N 106°08′40″W	Monte Vista	
10	Spruce Lodge	Spruce Lodge	October 21, 2008 (#08001009)	29431 U.S. Route 160; 37°40′22″N 106°37′24″W	South Fork	
11	Sutherland Bridge	Sutherland Bridge	February 4, 1985 (#85000234)	Off U.S. Route 160; 37°39′49″N 106°17′47″W	Del Norte	Warren Pony Truss
12	US Post Office and Federal Building-Monte Vista Main	US Post Office and Federal Building-Monte Vista Main	January 22, 1986 (#86000182)	Washington and 2nd Ave. 37°34′45″N 106°08′39″W	Monte Vista	
13	Wheeler Bridge		February 4, 1985 (#85000235)	Off U.S. Route 160; 37°39′29″N 106°17′20″W	Del Norte	Howe pony truss, replaced sometime after 1985

== Former listing ==
	Name on the Register	Image	Date listed	Date removed	Location	City or town	Description
1	Masonic Park Bridge		February 4, 1985 (#85000236)	July 22, 1994	Masonic Park Drive over Rio Grande; 37°42′02″N 106°41′09″W	South Fork	Replaced in 1994.

== See also ==
- List of National Historic Landmarks in Colorado
- List of National Register of Historic Places in Colorado
- Bibliography of Colorado
- Geography of Colorado
- History of Colorado
- Index of Colorado-related articles
- List of Colorado-related lists
- Outline of Colorado
