= Federal Building and Post Office =

Federal Building and Post Office, and variations such as prefixed by Old, may refer to:

- Main Post Office and Federal Building (Oakland, California), listed on the National Register of Historic Places (NRHP) in Alameda County
- U.S. Post Office, Courthouse and Federal Building (Sacramento, California), Sacramento, California, NRHP-listed
- Cañon City Post Office and Federal Building, Cañon City, Colorado, NRHP-listed in Fremont County
- US Post Office and Federal Building–Delta Main, Delta, Colorado, NRHP-listed in Delta County
- U.S. Post Office and Federal Building (Denver, Colorado), Denver, Colorado, NRHP-listed
- US Post Office and Federal Building–Monte Vista Main, Monte Vista, Colorado, NRHP-listed in Rio Grande County
- US Post Office, Federal Building, and Federal Courthouse–Sterling Main, Sterling, Colorado, NRHP-listed in Logan County
- U. S. Post Office and Federal Building (Hartford, Connecticut) / now known as William R. Cotter Federal Building, Hartford, Connecticut, NRHP-listed
- U.S. Post Office–Federal Building (Sarasota, Florida), NRHP-listed
- Federal Building, U.S. Courthouse, Downtown Postal Station, Tampa, Florida, NRHP-listed
- Old U.S. Post Office and Federal Building (Macon, Georgia), NRHP-listed
- Terre Haute Post Office and Federal Building, Terre Haute, Indiana, NRHP-listed
- Federal Building–US Post Office (Independence, Kansas), Independence, Kansas, NRHP-listed in Montgomery County
- US Post Office and Federal Building–Salina, Salina, Kansas, NRHP-listed in Saline County
- United States Post Office and Federal Building (Wichita, Kansas), NRHP-listed in Sedgwick County
- Federal Building and US Post Office–Owensboro, Owensboro, Kentucky, listed on the NRHP in Kentucky
- Old U.S. Post Office and Federal Building (Aberdeen, Mississippi), a Mississippi Landmark
- Old U.S. Post Office and Federal Building (Oxford, Mississippi), a Mississippi Landmark
- Lewistown Federal Building & Post Office, Lewistown, Montana, NRHP-listed in Fergus County
- Federal Building and Post Office (Fallon, Nevada), NRHP-listed
- Federal Building and Post Office (New York, New York), NRHP-listed
- U. S. Post Office and Federal Building (Rockingham, North Carolina), Rockingham, North Carolina, NRHP-listed
- Akron Post Office and Federal Building, Akron, Ohio, NRHP-listed
- Old Federal Building and Post Office (Cleveland, Ohio), NRHP-listed
- Old Post Office and Federal Building (Dayton, Ohio), Dayton, Ohio, listed on the NRHP in Ohio
- US Post Office and Federal Building–Zanesville, Zanesville, Ohio, NRHP-listed
- Post Office, Courthouse, and Federal Office Building, Oklahoma City, Oklahoma, NRHP-listed
- U.S. Post Office and Federal Building (La Grande, Oregon), La Grande, Oregon, NRHP-listed
- U.S. Post Office and Federal Building (Austin, Texas), Austin, Texas, NRHP-listed
- US Post Office–Federal Building–Brenham, Brenham, Texas, listed on the NRHP in Texas
- Lubbock Post Office and Federal Building, Lubbock, Texas, listed on the NRHP in Texas
- US Post Office and Federal Building (Port Arthur, Texas), Port Arthur, TX, listed on the NRHP in Texas
- Post Office and Federal Building (San Antonio, Texas), included in the Alamo Plaza Historic District
- Old Federal Building and Post Office (Victoria, Texas), listed on the NRHP in Texas
- U.S. Post Office – Downtown Tacoma, also known as "U.S. Post Office – Downtown Tacoma – Federal Building", Tacoma, Washington, NRHP-listed in Pierce County

== See also ==
- List of United States post offices
- List of United States federal courthouses
