= Lewis Greenleaf Adams =

American architect (1897–1977)

- Born: November 23, 1897; Lenox, Massachusetts
- Died: November 29, 1977 (aged 80); New York Hospital, New York City
- Education: Yale University (1920), Ecole des Beaux Arts (1926)
- Occupation: Architect
- Awards: F.B. Morse Prize (1935); Sherrill Prize (1936)
- Practice: Principal in Lewis Greenleaf Adams, Adams & Prentice, Partner in Adams & Woodbridge, Malmfeldt, Adams & Prentice, and Malmfeldt, Adams & Woodbridge,

Lewis Greenleaf Adams, AIA, (1897–1977), was an American architect based in New York City who practiced in mid- to late-twentieth-century New York, New Jersey, and Connecticut, as part of the firms Malmfeldt, Adams & Prentice, Adams & Prentice (fl. 1929–1941), Malmfeldt, Adams & Woodbridge, Adams & Woodbridge (fl. 1945–1974), and under his own name at the end of his life (fl. 1974–1977), always based in New York City.

== Personal life ==
Born on November 23, 1897, in Lenox, Massachusetts to Mr. and Mrs. William Adams of New York. He had an older brother named William Jr.

In a double-marriage ceremony on July 24, 1921, he married Emiline Kellogg, daughter of Mr. and Mrs. Frederick Kellogg of Utica, New York, and younger sister of Lois Kellogg who was married that same day to Philip C. Jessup, son of Mr. and Mrs. Henry Wynans Jessup, of 20 Fifth Avenue. The double-wedding took place on the grounds of the brides' parents residence. Adams' best man was his brother William Adams Jr. After which they moved to France for a few years. While there he focused his studies of European architecture. He and his wife had two children. A son, Richard Greenleaf Adams, born in 1923 and 4 years later they welcomed a daughter named Lois Kellogg Adams. They then moved back to New York sometime in the 1930s.

He was a member of the U.S. Naval Reserve as a Lieutenant, Lt. Commander, and Commander, serving as a security officer of the Brooklyn Naval Yard from 1942 to 1945.

In 1970, he lived on East 86th Street. He was a veteran of both World Wars, serving as a commander in the United States Naval Reserve from 1917 to 1920 and 1941 to 1945.

== Education ==
Adams attended the Groton School, graduation in 1916. earned his Bachelor of Architecture from the Yale University in 1920. There, he was a member of the secret society, Skull and Bones.

He studied at the Ecole des Beaux Arts in Paris in 1926. He won the F.B. Morse Prize in 1935 and the Sherrill Prize in 1936.

He was likely related to architect John C. Greenleaf, as that architect had offices in 15 West 38th Street, Manhattan, from as early as 1919 to as late as 1924, while the firm of Adams and Prentice, of which Lewis Greenleaf Adams was partner was established at that address in 1929.

== Architectural career ==
Adams joined the American Institute of Architects New York Chapter in 1931.

He was licensed in New York (1929), Connecticut (1933), New Jersey (1931), and nationally as NCARB (1940)

Within the AIA, he was the chairman of the Unification Committee in 1941, the B.A.I.D. Trustee, Director, and a trustee, president of the Diplome Society. He was a member of the Architectural League.

Adams commenced his practice in 1929, that year forming the firm of Adams & Prentice from 1929 to 1941, which shortly became the firm of Malmfeldt, Adams & Prentice and briefly Malmfeldt, Adams & Woodbridge in the early 1930s. Adams continued those firms merging with Frederick James Woodbridge the sole partner of Evans, Moore & Woodbridge in 1945 to form the firm of Adams & Woodbridge. Adams & Woodbridge estimated in 1953 to be "about 100 residences and alterations."

== Works ==
- 1957–1969: 12 buildings for the Adirondack Museum, Blue Mountain Lake, New York
- 1958: Hamilton College Freshman Dormitory and Infirmary, Clinton, New York
- 1963: New York City Episcopal Church Center, New York City.
- 1966: Trinity Church Manning Wing, New York City.
- 1967: Harriet Phipps House, Girl Scouts Greater New York, New York City
