= John Cameron Greenleaf =

American architect (1878–1958)

- Born: June 2, 1878; Lenox, Massachusetts, U.S.
- Died: January 18, 1958 (aged 79); Tarrytown, New York, U.S.
- Education: Sheffield Scientific School; Columbia University; Ecole des Beaux Arts
- Occupation: Architect
- Practice: John C. Greenleaf; Mills & Greenlead

John Cameron Greenleaf, AIA, (June 2, 1878 – January 18, 1958), was an American architect based in New York City who practiced in the early 20th–century under his own name and as partner in the firm of Mills & Greenleaf.

== Early life ==
Greenleaf was born in Lenox, Massachusetts. He was the son of Adalein E. (née Stone) and Dr. Richard C. Greenleaf, a physician. His father came to Lenox from Boston in 1875 and built a summer home on Yonkun Avenue; the property was sold to the Lenox Club in 1913.

He attended Westminster School. Next, he enrolled in Yale University's Sheffield Scientific School, graduating in 1899. While at Yale, he was a member of the Fraternity of Delta Psi (St. Anthony Hall), the Renaissance Club, the University Banjo Club, and Yale's crew team. He was also a Cup Man and was chairman of the Triennial Committee. In addition, he served on the governing board of the University Club.

He studied architecture at Columbia University from 1899 to 1901. In the summer of 1901, he moved to Paris. From April 18, 1903, to 1905, he studied architecture at the Ecole des Beaux Arts.

== Career ==
Greenleaf returned to the United States in August 1905. He worked for a New York City architectural firm for eighteen months before establishing Mills & Greenleaf in 1907 with J. Laying Mills, a 1901 graduate of Yale University. Their offices were at 345 Fifth Avenue in New York City.

As Mills & Greenleaf, the firm was many times awarded. In 1908, by the Board of Awards, in Albany, New York, and judged to be among the most meritorious designs for a competition entered for a state prison. They were referenced as among the associate architects attached to the new state prison erected in Peekskill, New York, located on an unusually high plateau overlooking the Hudson River.

In 1908, Mills & Greenleaf designed a Tudor Revival brick orphanage, the St. Marguerite's Home, in Mendham, New Jersey. This building is now part of The Community of St. John Baptist National Register Historic District.

Mills & Greenleaf were selected "from the sixty-two designs submitted by the leading architects of the country for the great water gate and Fulton memorial which is to be erected in Riverside Drive between 114th and 116th Streets at an approximate cost of $2,500,000. The just of award of the Robert Fulton Monument Association announced yesterday at the Engineers' Club the names of the ten successful competitors in the preliminary competition. The award's jury consisted of two architects, Thomas Hastings and George B. Post; two laymen, Robert Fulton Cutting and Isaac Guggenheim, and Lansing C. Holden as advisory architects. Each of these ten competitors received a prize of $500. The successful contestants are Charles P. Huntington, Mills & Greenleaf. Lawrence F. Peck, J. H. Freedlander, Bosworth & Holden, and Harold Van Buren Magonigle of New York City…."

Mills & Greenleaf designed the Wedgewood, a mansion for August Cheney in Manchester, Connecticut which was completed in 1911. However, they split sometime around 1910. This was around the time of the death of Greenleaf's father who would have left his son a sizable inheritance.

As a solo practitioner, Greenleaf focused on residential projects. In 1913, Greenleaf was hired to remodel his family's former summer house in Lenox, Massachusetts into the Lenox Club. Greenleaf also designed additions to Wedgewood in 1921. His other residential projects include homes for Marshall Prentiss in Litchfield, Connecticut, and for E S. Mills in Hewlett, Long Island.

He was very likely related to architect Lewis Greenleaf Adams, as that architect founded his first practice (Adams & Prentice) at offices in 15 West 38th Street, Manhattan, in 1929, which had been the premises of Greenleaf himself from as early as 1919 to as late as 1924.

== Professional affiliations ==
He was a charter member of Society of Beaux Arts Architects in New York City. He was also a member of the American Institute of Architecture and the Municipal Art Society in New York City.

== Personal life ==
On May 25, 1907, Greenleaf married Marion Constance Bacon in Lenox, Massachusetts. They had a son, John C. Greenleaf Jr., and three daughters, Adeline Emily (1908) and Elizabeth (1910). In 1910, the family lived at Pelham Manor in New York. He later lived in the San Carlos Hotel in New York.

He was a member of The Graduate Club of New Haven, the Pelham Country Club, the St. Anthony Club of New York, the University Club of New York, the Yale Club of New York City Greenleaf was also a member of the Yale Graduate Advisory Rowing Committee.

In 1958, he died in a retirement community in Tarrytown, New York at the age of eighty. He was buried in the Lenox Cemetery-on-the-hill in Lenox, Massachusetts.

== Selected works ==
- 1907: 171 Second Street, a six-story brick and stone tenement at 171 2nd Street, New York City for Margaret W Folsom of Waverley, Massachusetts for the expected cost of $31,000
- 1908: Associate architects for the Sing Sing Prison Competition, Peekskill, New York
- 1908: St. Marguerite's Home, two-story brick building with wings, Mendham Township and Mendham Borough, New Jersey (National Register Historic District)
- 1908: renovations to 311 East 13th Street, New York City for the expected cost of $5,000
- 1911: Wedgeway, the Austin Cheney residence, 99 Hartford Road, Manchester, Connecticut
- 1913: Renovation of the Lenox Club, Lenox, Massachusetts
- 1916: 15 East 64th Street, a five-story fireproof residence for Helen C. Thorpe of 6 East 69th Street for the expected cost of $100,000
- 1919: 118 West 13th Street, a two-story brick laundry and infirmary for the Ladies' Christian Union of New York City for the expected cost of $31,000
- 1921: Additions to Wedgeway, the Austin Cheney residence, 99 Hartford Road, Manchester, Connecticut
- 1923: 8–10 West 37th Street, a ten-story brick store and loft building for a speculative development corporation for the expected cost of $$300,000.
- Residence for E. S. Mills in Hewlett, Long Island
- Residence for Marshall Prentiss in Litchfield, Connecticut
