= Evans, Moore & Woodbridge =

American architectural firm in early to mid-twentieth-century

Evans, Moore, and Woodbridge was an American architectural firm in early to mid-twentieth-century New York City. Through partner, Frederick James Woodbridge, FAIA, it was a predecessor firms Adams and Woodbridge, which estimated in 1953 that the firm and its predecessors (including Evans, Moore & Woodbridge, Adams & Prentice (1929–1941), and Malmfeldt, Adams & Woodbridge) had been responsible for "about 100 residences and alterations."

== Works as Evans, Moore & Woodbridge ==
- 1928: Roger Ascham School, White Plains, New York
- 1929: Committee Health Center, Middletown, New Jersey, $25,000
- 1929: Keene Valley Church, Keene Valley, New York $25,000
- 1932: Smith College Alumnae House, Northampton, Massachusetts, $285,000 or $300,000
- Princeton University Faculty Housing, Princeton, New Jersey
- R.T. Swaine Residence, Lewisboro, New York (as Evans, Moore & Woodbridge)
- Morrow Library, Amherst, Massachusetts
- H. Matthew Residence, Brewster, New York

== Works as Malmfeldt, Adams & Woodbridge ==
- 1932: Wethersfield Church Home, Wethersfield, Connecticut, $100,000
