= Keck Homestead =

- U.S. National Register of Historic Places
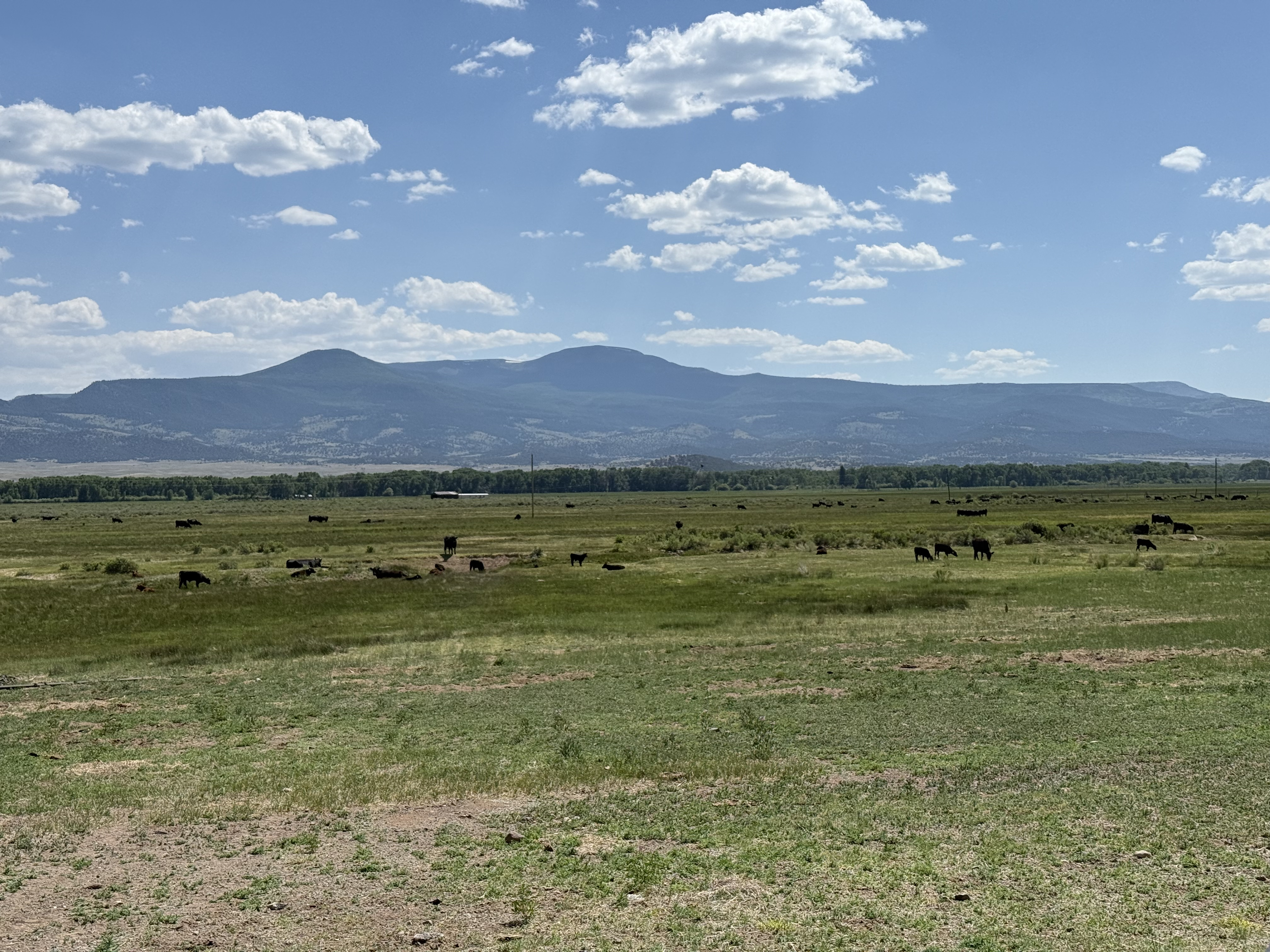
- Former Location of the Keck Homestead

- Location within Colorado
- Location: 12888 County Road 15, Rio Grande County, Colorado, about 5 miles (8.0 km) from Del Norte, Colorado
- Coordinates: 37°42′00″N 106°26′03″W
- Area: 60 acres (24 ha)
- Built by: Keck, Christian
- Architectural style: Pioneer log
- NRHP reference No.: 98000437
- Added to NRHP: May 8, 1998

The Keck Homestead, near Del Norte, Colorado, was homesteaded in 1876. It includes four log buildings built by Christian Keck and his sons, at a high altitude. These structures are no longer visible.

It was listed on the National Register of Historic Places in 1988. The listing included two contributing buildings and two contributing structures on 60 acres (24 ha).

The house was a two-story L-shaped building on a dry stone foundation.
