= Mills & Greenleaf =

American architectural firm

Mills and Greenleaf was an American architectural firm in the early twentieth-century New York City, established in 1906 by J. Laying Mills and John Cameron Greenleaf. The firm practiced out of 345 Fifth Avenue, Manhattan, New York City.

Mills had graduated from Yale University in 1901, where he may have met Greenleaf, who was two years his senior and graduated from Yale University Sheffield Scientific School in 1899), before studying architecture at Columbia University from 1899 to 1901 and then at the Ecole des Beaux Arts from 1903 to 1905.

Greenleaf returned to New York in August 1905, worked in New York firm before establishing Mills & Greenleaf. As Mills & Greenleaf, the firm was many times awarded. In 1908, by the Board of Awards, in Albany, New York, and judged to be among the most meritorious designs for a competition entered for a state prison. They were referenced as among the associate architects attached to the new state prison erected in Peekskill, New York, located on an unusually high plateau overlooking the Hudson River.

Mills & Greenleaf were selected “from the sixty-two designs submitted by the leading architects of the country for the great water gate and Fulton memorial which is to be erected in Riverside Drive between 114th and 116th Streets at an approximate cost of $2,500,000. The just of award of the Robert Fulton Monument Association announced yesterday at the Engineers’ Club the names of the ten successful competitors in the preliminary competition. The jury of award consisted of two architects, Thomas Hastings and George B. Post; two laymen, Robert Fulton Cutting and Isaac Guggenheim, and Lansing C. Holden as advisory architects. Each of these ten competitors received a prize of $500. The successful contestants are Charles P. Huntington, Mills & Greenleaf. Lawrence F. Peck, J.H. Freedlander, Bosworth & Holden, and Harold Van Buren Magonigle of New York City....”

== Works ==
- 1907: 171 Second Street, a six-storey brick-and-stone tenement for Margaret W. Folsom of Waverley, Massachusetts for the expected cost of $31,000.
- 1908: Associate architects attached to the new Sing Sing Prison Competition (Peekskill, New York)
- 1910: Austin Cheney Residence, Manchester, CT
