= Adams & Woodbridge =

20th-century American architectural firm

Adams and Woodbridge was an American architectural firm in the mid-twentieth-century New York City, established in 1945 by Lewis Greenleaf Adams, AIA, and Frederick James Woodbridge, FAIA, and disestablished in 1974 after the latter's death. It was the successor to the firms Evans, Moore & Woodbridge, Malmfeldt, Adams & Prentice, Adams & Prentice (fl. 1929–1941), and Malmfeldt, Adams & Woodbridge

Adams & Woodbridge estimated in 1953 that their firm and its predecessors had been responsible for “about 100 residences and alterations.”

== Works as Adams & Woodbridge (1945-1974) ==
- 1947: New Jersey Manager's Association, Trenton, New Jersey, $750,000
- 1947: (Addition to) Brick Presbyterian Church (Park Avenue), New York City, $600,000
- 1947: Woodmere Academy, Woodmere, New York, $260,000
- 1950: Alterations to Horace Mann Building, Teacher's College, Manhattan, $380,000
- 1952: Brick Church Chapel, Manhattan, New York, $115,000
- 1952: Trinity Cathedral renovation, Newark, New Jersey, $110,000
- 1952: Westwood Elementary School, Westwood, New Jersey, $460,000
- 1952: Cedar Grove Community Church, Cedar Grove, New Jersey, $114,000
- 1953: Church of the Open Door, Brooklyn, New York, $160,000
- 1957-1969: 12 buildings for the Adirondack Museum, Blue Mountain Lake, New York
- 1958: Hamilton College Dunham Dormitory, Clinton, New York
- 1959: Hamilton College Rudd Infirmary, Clinton, New York
- 1963: New York City Episcopal Church Center, New York City.
- 1966: Trinity Church Manning Wing, New York City.
- 1967: Harriet Phipps House, Girl Scouts Greater New York, New York City

== Works responsible by either the various firms of Adams or Woodbridge ==
- Henry R. Luce Residence (Gladstone, New Jersey), $150,000
- Howard Phipps Residence (Westbury, New York), on Long Island, $380,000
