= Spruce Lodge =

Historic place in Colorado, United States

- U.S. National Register of Historic Places
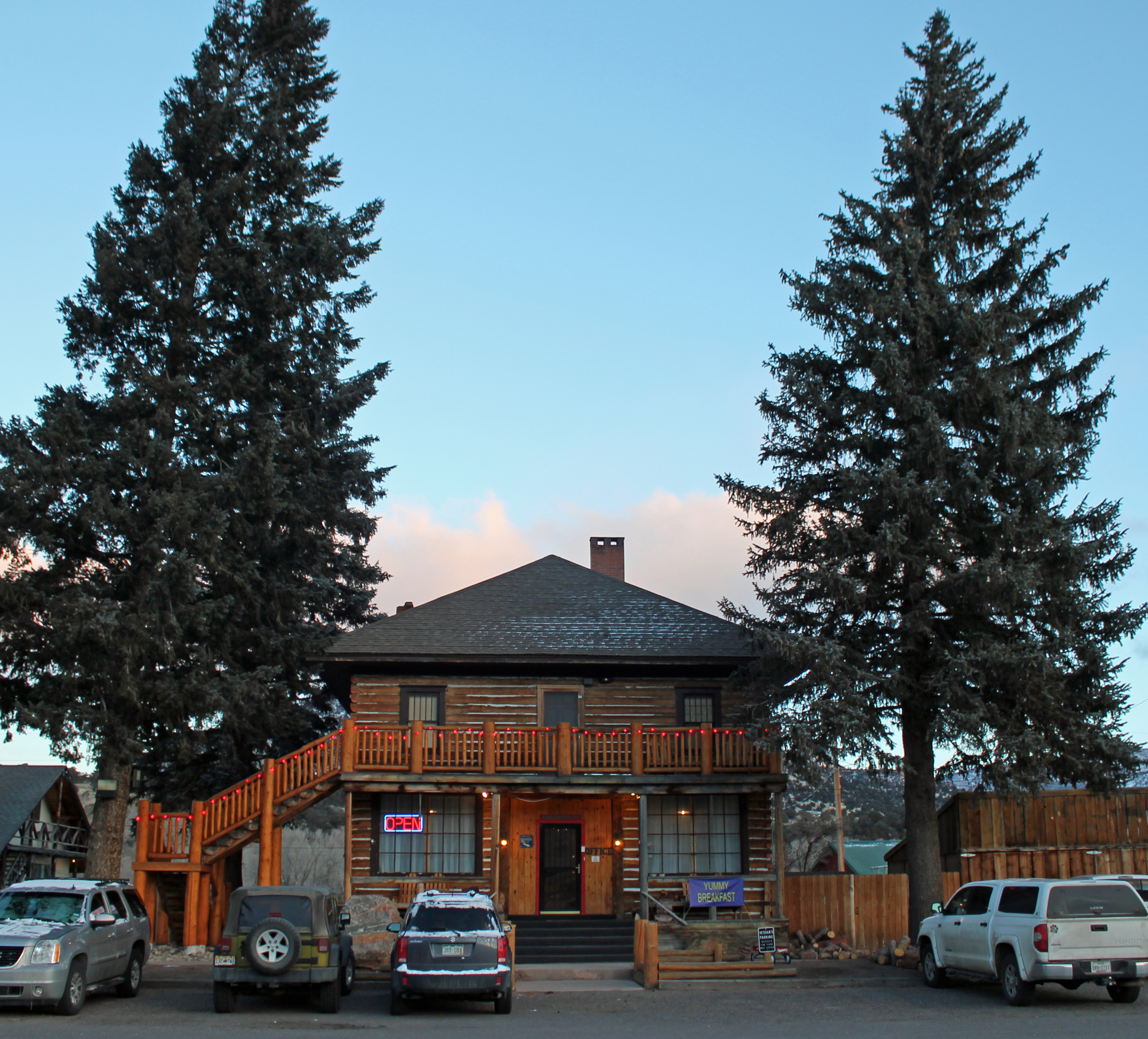

- Location within Colorado
- Location: 29431 W. US Hwy. 160, South Fork, Colorado
- Coordinates: 37°40′22″N 106°37′24″W
- Area: less than one acre
- Built: 1927
- Architectural style: Rustic
- NRHP reference No.: 08001009
- Added to NRHP: October 21, 2008

The Spruce Lodge, at 29431 W. US Hwy. 160 in South Fork, Colorado, is a hotel complex whose main original building was built in 1927. It was listed on the National Register of Historic Places in 2008.

The original lodge is a Rustic style 40 by 91 feet (12 m × 28 m) log building with a hipped roof, built upon a concrete basement foundation. It has a two-story porch supported by round wood posts.

One other building, the "Cook's Cabin", is deemed contributing; three more buildings are non-contributing.
