= Monte Vista Library =

- U.S. National Register of Historic Places
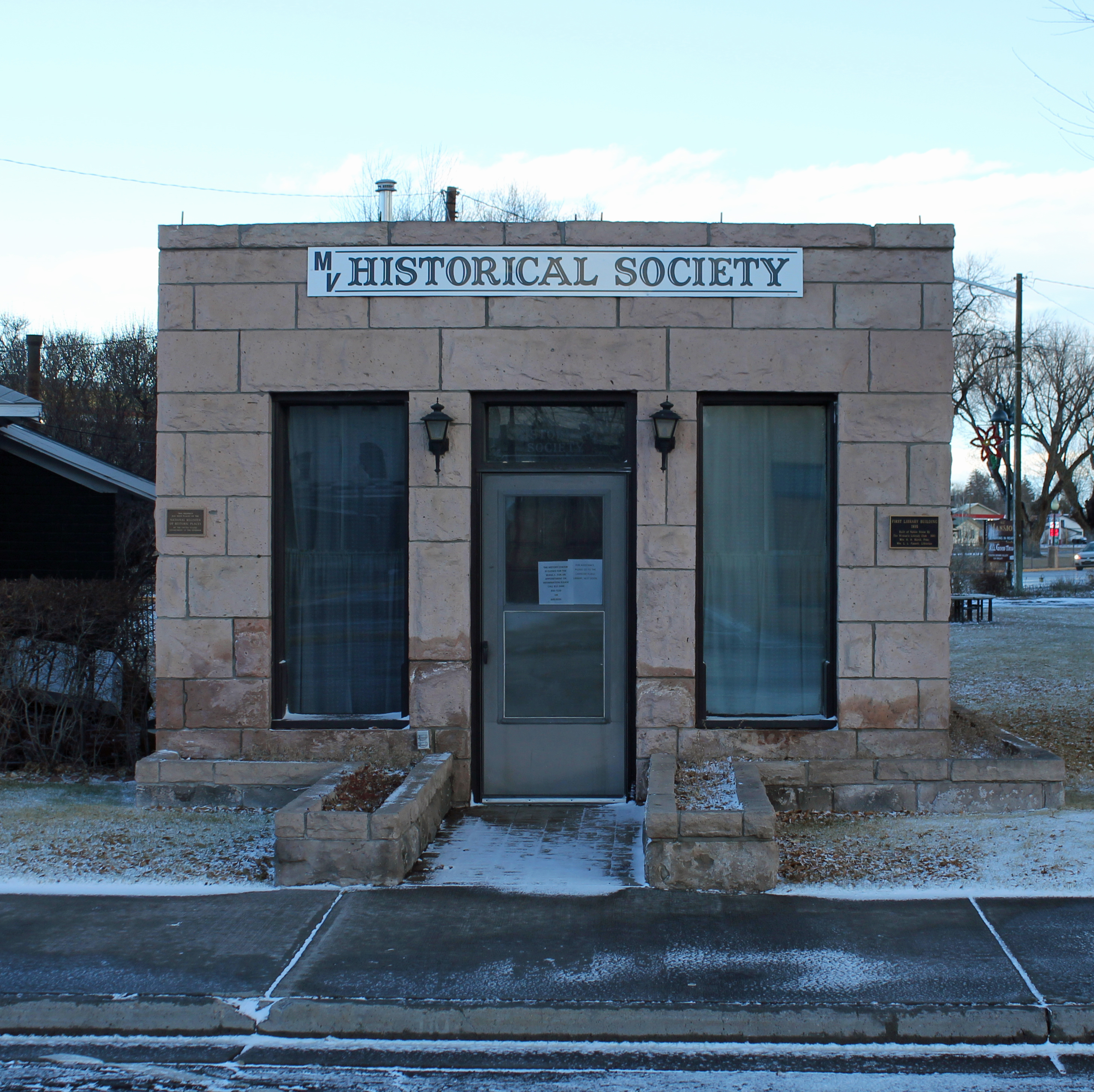

- Location within Colorado
- Location: 110 Jefferson St., Monte Vista, Colorado
- Coordinates: 37°34′48″N 106°08′40″W
- Area: less than one acre
- Built: 1895
- Architectural style: Early Commercial
- NRHP reference No.: 95000782
- Added to NRHP: June 30, 1995

The Monte Vista Library, at 110 Jefferson St. in Monte Vista, Colorado, was built in 1895. It was listed on the National Register of Historic Places in 1995.

It was the result of efforts started by the Women's Literary Club, organized in 1885, "for community improvement and the establishment of a circulating library." The first library operated out of part of a store. The Monte Vista Library Association was incorporated in 1887. In 1894 the entire library collection, along with many city records, were lost in fire.

This building was constructed in 1895. It is a 16 by 22 feet (4.9 m × 6.7 m) building, Early Commercial in style. It served as the town's library and reading room until the town's Carnegie Public Library was opened in 1919.

In 1995 it was in use by the Monte Vista Historical Society.
