= William R. Cotter Federal Building =

- U. S. Post Office and Federal Building
- U.S. National Register of Historic Places

- Location within Connecticut Location within the United States
- Location: 135–149 High Street, Hartford, Connecticut
- Coordinates: 41°46′11″N 72°40′50″W
- Area: 1.7 acres (0.69 ha)
- Built: 1931–1933
- Architect: Malmfeldt, Adams & Prentice
- Architectural style: Neoclassical, Art Deco, Stripped Classical
- NRHP reference No.: 81000623
- Added to NRHP: October 19, 1981

The William R. Cotter Federal Building is a historic post office, courthouse, and federal office building located at 135–149 High Street in Hartford, Connecticut. It was the courthouse for United States District Court for the District of Connecticut until 1963.

== History ==
In 1882, the federal government completed construction of Hartford's first permanent post office building. By the 1920s, however, Hartford residents were campaigning for a new postal building to replace the overcrowded Second Empire-style structure. In 1928, the government selected a site for the new building, and two years later contracted the local architectural firm of Malmfeldt, Adams, & Prentice to design the building. Although the Public Buildings Act of 1926 authorized the Office of the Supervising Architect of the U.S. Treasury to hire private architects to design federal buildings, the Hartford project was one of the few times that the Act was actually invoked.

Construction commenced in 1931. On April 14, 1932, citizens and officials gathered for a cornerstone laying ceremony, and construction was completed the following year. The new building originally served as a post office, courthouse, and office building. It is one of Hartford's most notable examples of the Neoclassical architectural style, which was commonly used for public buildings during the early twentieth century. Architectural Forum cited the building as an example for private architects to follow when completing Public Works Administration commissions.

Major interior renovations to the federal building occurred in 1964 and 1978 after the courts and post office vacated the location. In 1982, the federal government renamed the building to honor Congressman William R. Cotter, who represented the First District of Connecticut from 1971 until his death in 1981. The building was listed in the National Register of Historic Places in 1981 and currently houses various federal offices.

== Architecture ==
The William R. Cotter Federal Building is an excellent example of Neoclassical architecture. The architects adopted traditional classical architectural forms while abandoning excessive interior ornament in favor of Art Deco's more stylized decorative components. The building conveys the federal government's dignity and stability, an ideology that was particularly important during the Great Depression.

The three-story federal building is situated on a trapezoidal block bounded by High and South Church streets and Foot Guard and Hoadley places in downtown Hartford. The building fills the entire block with its irregular footprint. However, a light court occupies the second and third stories, admitting natural light into the interior. The exterior has remained largely intact since the building's completion in 1933.

The steel-frame building rests on a granite foundation. The exterior is faced with Indiana limestone panels. The facade, which faces High Street, consists of a three-story central block flanked by pavilions. Limestone pilasters separate each bay on the central section, which features a projecting cornice topped with decorative cresting. Aluminum spandrels divide each story's casement windows, and spandrels between the first and second stories contain American eagle motifs. Simple recessed panels separate the second and third stories. Projecting pavilions, each containing two modified, Corinthian order columns, frame the two principal entrances located at each end of the High Street elevation. Wisconsin black marble surrounds the entryways. A curved terrace, enclosed by a granite-and-iron balustrade, stretches between the granite entrance steps. Armillary spheres, representing celestial order, are located at each end of the balustrade.

A frieze above the facade's third story bears a six-line, two-part inscription that alludes to postal service duties. The quotation is divided by low-relief figures on horse-back transferring a message, recalling the Pony Express and early postal delivery methods. Aluminum eagles with uplifted wings perch at each end of the cornice.

Interior spaces are richly ornamented. On the first floor, a principal corridor connects two main lobbies. The lobbies and corridor have their original black terrazzo flooring inlaid with decorative borders and patterns. Most notably, one panel contains Hartford's symbol, which is a hart, or stag, crossing water. Flat panels of polished, Ross Curley Gray Tennessee marble cover the walls and are placed above a red marble base. The first-floor vaulted ceiling is painted blue with metallic gold stars. Aluminum, half-spherical and pendant light fixtures descend from the ceiling. Stylized ornamentation includes chevrons and Greek key patterns.

The corridor contains original, Art Deco-style, interior finishes. Each end of the corridor floor is inset with a brass-and-terrazzo panel with an envelope motif. Pairs of engaged black marble columns with aluminum ribs and stylized Doric order capitals flank two murals at each end of the corridor. The murals, painted in 1934 by the Barker Painting Company of New York, depict the eastern and western hemispheres. A decorative frieze lines the top of the corridor walls. The corridor ceiling contains recessed, framed beams bearing medallions with depictions of George Washington, Thomas Jefferson, Benjamin Franklin, and Abraham Lincoln.

The two original stairs are adjacent to the two first-floor elevator lobbies. The stairs are made of black soapstone treads and a decorative, aluminum railing. In select locations, the building contains original three-paneled, aluminum doors decorated with stars.

Although the federal building has accommodated various functions, it has been continuously occupied since its completion. However, these changes in use resulted in major interior renovations. Most notably, galleries and other postal features were removed when the spaces were transformed into office areas. The corridors, stairwells, and bathrooms retain historic features and finishes.

== Significant events ==
- 1931–1933: Building constructed
- 1962: Federal courts vacate the building
- 1977: U.S. Postal Service vacates the building
- 1981: Building listed in the National Register of Historic Places
- 1982: Building renamed to honor Connecticut Congressman William R. Cotter

== Building facts ==
- Location: 135 High Street
- Architects: Malmfeldt, Adams, & Prentice
- Construction Dates: 1931–1933
- Architectural Style: Neoclassical
- Landmark Status: Listed in the National Register of Historic Places
- Primary Materials: Granite; limestone; marble
- Prominent features: Monumental entrances at corners of Facade; stylized art-deco motifs; lobby with original aluminum, marble, and terrazzo finishes

== See also ==
- National Register of Historic Places listings in Hartford, Connecticut
- List of United States post offices
