= Monte Vista Downtown Historic District =

Historic district in Colorado, United States

- U.S. National Register of Historic Places
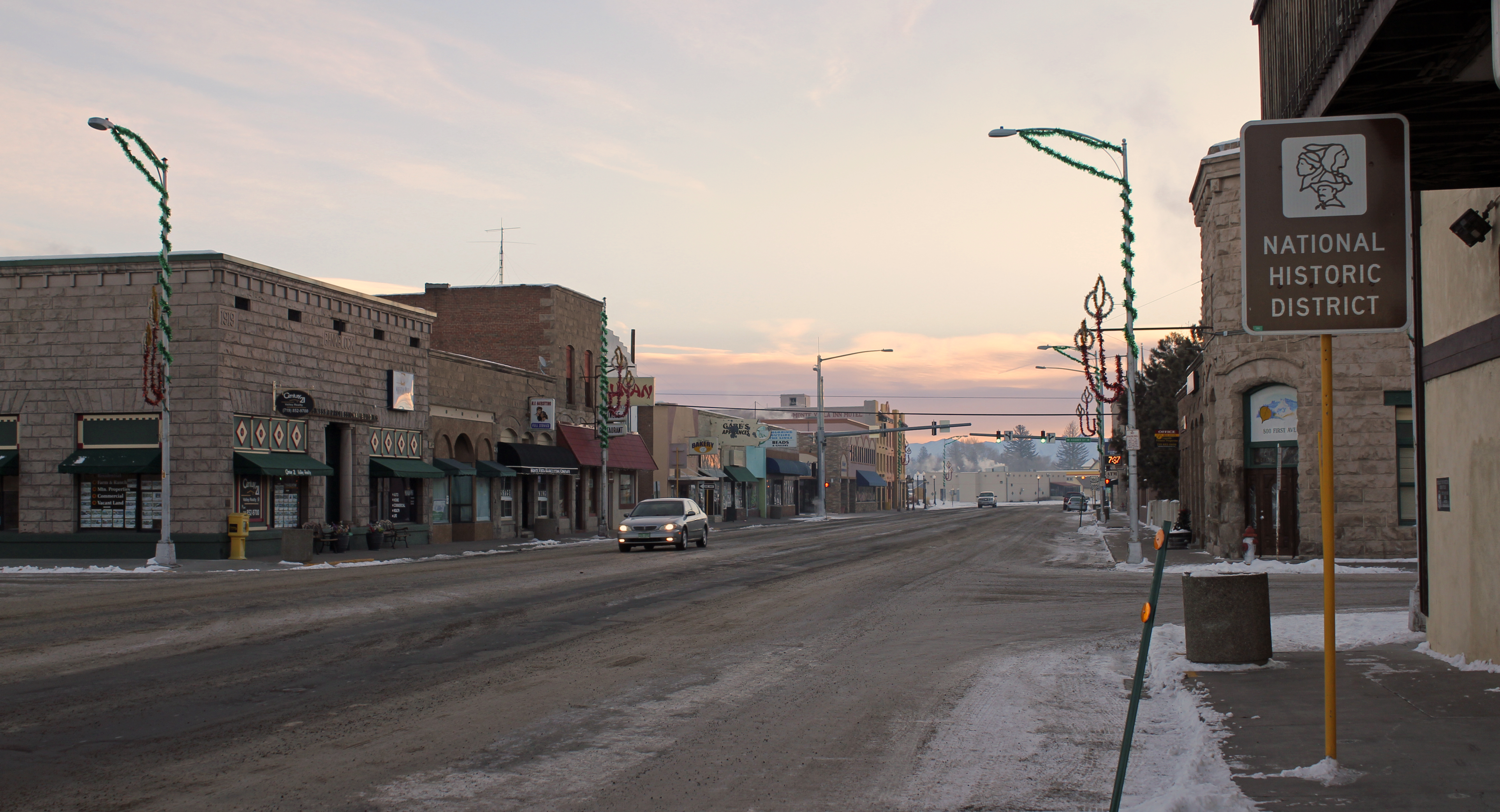

- Location within Colorado
- Location: Jct. of First Ave. and Washington St., Monte Vista, Colorado
- Coordinates: 37°34′50″N 106°08′51″W
- Area: 1 acre (0.40 ha)
- Built: 1889
- Architect: Multiple
- Architectural style: Early Commercial, Romanesque
- NRHP reference No.: 91001612
- Added to NRHP: November 1, 1991

The Monte Vista Downtown Historic District, in Monte Vista, Colorado, is a historic district which was listed on the National Register of Historic Places in 1991. It included nine contributing buildings and some non-contributing ones.

The district is in the area of the junction of 1st Ave. and Washington St. It includes:

- 810 First Avenue (1892), a legal office building
- 806 First Avenue (1892), built of rhyolite stone
- State Bank building, 800 First Avenue (1890)
- Hunter Mercantile Company, 747 First Avenue (1906)
- Monte Vista Armory, 15 Washington Street (1921–22)
- Monte Vista Bank and Trust, 803 First Avenue (1918–19)
- 809 First Avenue (1902)
- 813/815 First Avenue (1903)
- 819 First Avenue (1905), Correll-Dunker Candy Kitchen
