= Frederick James Woodbridge =

American architect

Frederick James Woodbridge AIA
- Born: May 18, 1900; Minneapolis, Minnesota, U.S.
- Died: January 17, 1974 (aged 73); Manhattan, New York City, U.S.
- Education: Phillips Exeter Academy (1917); Amherst College (1921); Columbia University (1923); American Academy in Rome (1923-1925)
- Organization: American Institute of Architects
- Partner(s): Adams & Woodbridge; Malmfeldt, Adams & Woodbridge; Evans, Moore & Woodbridge
- Parent: Frederick J. E. Woodbridge

Frederick James Woodbridge (May 18, 1900 – January 17, 1974) was an American architect. His projects were based in New York, New Jersey, and Connecticut. He was partners in the firms Evans, Moore & Woodbridge, Malmfeldt, Adams & Woodbridge, and Adams & Woodbridge (1945–1974), as well as being a sometime archeologist.

== Early life and education ==
Born May 18, 1900, in Minneapolis, Minnesota. Woodbridge attended Phillips Exeter Academy, graduating in 1917, Amherst College, graduating in 1921, Columbia Graduate School of Architecture, Planning and Preservation, graduating in 1923, and the American Academy in Rome from 1923 to 1925. He was also the Boyer Research Fellow in Classical Archeology at the University of Michigan.

== Architectural career ==
Woodbridge began his career at McKim, Mead & White, working there from 1921 to 1922, and as a draftsman there from 1925 to 1929. He was licensed in New York (1928), Connecticut (1930), New Jersey (1937), and nationally as NCARB (1939) and commenced his practice as a partner in 1929

Within the AIA, he was the chairman for the Committee on Architectural Services, Vice Chairman for the Committee on Building Costs, and Secretary for the New York Chapter Civilian Protection Committee from 1940 to 1941. He was the president of the Architectural League and secretary of its executive committee.

He was a member of the Plattsburg & Columbia S.A.T.C. in 1918, U.S. Naval Reserve Lieutenant, Lt. Commander of the O. in C. Air Naval Training Unit, Naval and Air Station, Quonset, from 1942 to 1945.

He was faculty at the Extension School of Architecture, 1934–1942, as a critic in Design, Instructor in History of Architecture and Rendering, and Lecturer on Design at the Institutional Residence Halls of Teachers College, Columbia University (1939–1942). He was the architect for excavations at Antioch of Pisidia, Turkey, and at Carthage, Tunisia, from 1924 to 1925.

== Death ==
He died on January 17, 1974 (aged 73) in Manhattan, New York City.
