= Adams & Prentice =

American architectural firm

Adams & Prentice, Malmfeldt, Adams & Prentice, and Malmfeldt, Adams & Woodbridge were a series of American architectural firms in mid-twentieth-century New York City, with Adams & Prentice (fl. 1929–1941) being the most well-known, all established by architect Lewis Greenleaf Adams, AIA with various partners. The series of partnerships were the predecessor firms of the influential firm Adams & Woodbridge (fl. 1945–1974), which was functional from 1945 to 1974 with partners Adams and Frederick James Woodbridge, FAIA, formerly of the firm Evans, Moore & Woodbridge. Adams & Woodbridge later estimated in 1953 that their firm and its above-mentioned predecessor firms had been responsible for “about 100 residences and alterations.” In 1929, the office was located at 15 West 38th Street, Manhattan.

== Works as Adams & Prentice (1929-1941) ==
- 1929: 255 West 34th Street, 6-story brick stores & loft building, built for 255 West 34th Street, Inc., (Theodore Margulis, President) at a cost of $45,000
- 1930: Brooks School (Andover, Massachusetts), $75,000
- 1930: Gnome Bakery (New York City), $10,000
- 1931: Richard B. Byrd School (Glen Rock, New Jersey). $85,000
- 1932: The Yale Daily News Building, Yale University, New Haven, Connecticut, $93,000 (as Adams & Prentice) or $100,000
- 1940: St. Bernard's School, Manhattan, New York City, $77,000

1933: Lu Shan, Gladstone, New Jersey, the estate of Henry and Leila Luce.

== Works as Malmfeldt, Adams & Woodbridge ==
- 1932: Wethersfield Church Home, Wethersfield, Connecticut, $100,000

== Works as Malmfeldt, Adams & Prentice ==
- 1931: West Middle School for the Hartford, Connecticut, School District, $325,000 or $340,000
- 1931: Madison Beach Yacht Club (Madison, Connecticut), $80,000
- 1934: William R. Cotter Federal Building, $1,031,000 (as Malmfeldt, Adams & Prentice) or $1,080,000.
- 1940: Edo Aircraft Factory for the Edo Aircraft Corporation, Long Island City, New York City, $305,000
