= Del Norte, Colorado =

Town in Colorado, US

- Statutory town
- Town of Del Norte
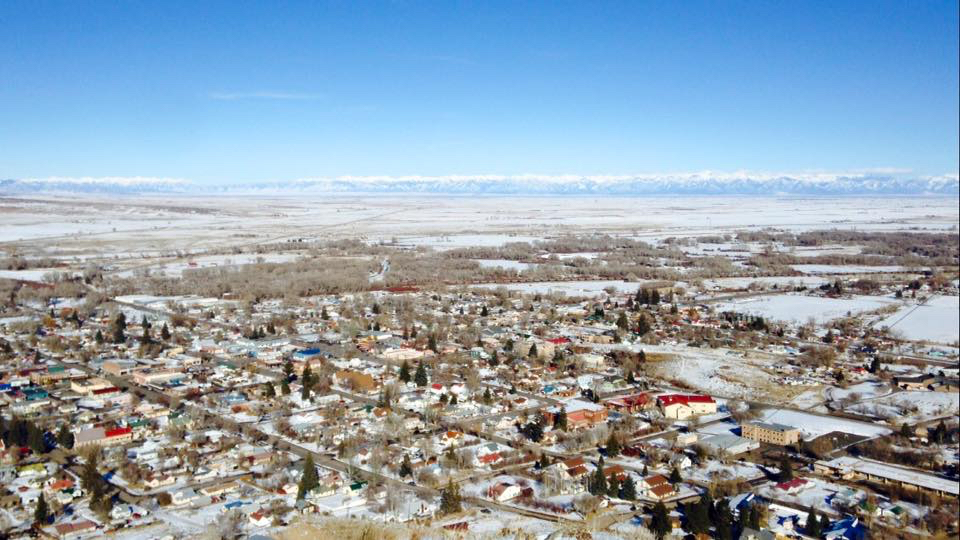
- Del Norte from the summit of Lookout Mountain with the Sangre de Cristo Range in the background.

- Location of the Town of Del Norte in Rio Grande County, Colorado
- Coordinates: 37°40′42″N 106°21′14″W
- Country: United States
- State: Colorado
- County: Rio Grande
- Incorporated: November 15, 1895

Government
  - Type: Statutory town

Area
  - Total: 0.983 sq mi (2.547 km^{2})
  - Land: 0.983 sq mi (2.547 km^{2})
  - Water: 0 sq mi (0.000 km^{2})
- Elevation: 7,884 ft (2,403 m)

Population (2020)
  - Total: 1,458
  - Density: 1,483/sq mi (572.4/km^{2})
- Time zone: UTC−07:00 (MST)
  - Summer (DST): UTC−06:00 (MDT)
- ZIP code: 81132
- Area code: 719
- GNIS town ID: 2412416
- FIPS code: 19795
- Website: www.delnortecolorado.com

Del Norte is the statutory town that is the county seat of Rio Grande County, Colorado, United States. The town's name is most commonly pronounced /ˈdɛl nɔɹt/. The town population was 1,458 at the 2020 United States census.

== History ==
Del Norte is named from the river Rio Grande del Norte, or "great river of the north". There is abundant evidence in the area in the form of arrowheads and campsites of ancient peoples living around Del Norte thousands of years ago, such as the Folsom people. Afterwards, the Utes were known to live around Del Norte and the rest of the San Luis Valley, going back hundreds of years prior to Euro-American contact. They lived here temporarily in the warmer months because of the abundance of wild game, plants, water, and timber in the area – winters were often too cold and harsh for them to settle permanently. Spanish and Mexican peoples were the first non-natives to explore the nearby land, coming from Santa Fe and other parts of New Mexico. They were interested in surveying the 'Rio del Norte', or 'River of the North' – hence the origin of the town's name. This was the original name of the Rio Grande headwaters prior to numerous name changes over the years.

Under Mexican jurisdiction, Hispanic families began moving into the area during the early to mid-19th century as part of land grants to help the Mexican government fill and occupy the territory. However, large-scale settlements were difficult to establish because the Utes were weary and very hostile towards Euro-American settlement, and would chase off many people who attempted to do so. The most successful early settlement nearby was called 'La Loma', established a few miles east of where the current town site is today. This area was chosen because there was a particular section of the Rio Grande here where it could be crossed safely and easily – one of few known for miles during this time. After the Treaty of Guadalupe-Hidalgo was signed in 1848, jurisdiction of the land in and around Del Norte transferred from Mexico to the United States, but settlement by Americans in the area was delayed by civil strife (including the American Civil War) throughout the 1850s and 1860s. Most American settlements began in the area around the early 1870s, by prospectors searching the nearby mountains for minerals, such as gold and silver, particularly near an eventual boom-town named Summitville, located at the base of South Mountain near Bennett Peak.

These peaks in the San Juan Mountains were some of the last parts of Colorado where miners were allowed to explore and prospect for minerals, and they were finally able to do so after the Brunot Treaty was signed between the U.S. government and the Utes in 1873. Rio Grande County was created on February 10, 1874, with the new mining camp of Del Norte as the county seat. Del Norte served as a base camp for the mines, not just in Summitville, but also in nearby Creede and Lake City. Miners quickly moved into the area, and they were followed by ranchers and farmers. Many of these original farming and ranching families still have operations and live in the Del Norte area to this day. The Del Norte, Colorado, post office opened on Jan 28, 1883. After the Sherman Act was repealed in 1893, mining operations quickly became unprofitable and ceased. The Town of Del Norte was incorporated on November 15, 1895. The 'glory days' of Del Norte ended as quickly as they began, but the community still survived because of ranching and agriculture.

== Physical geography ==
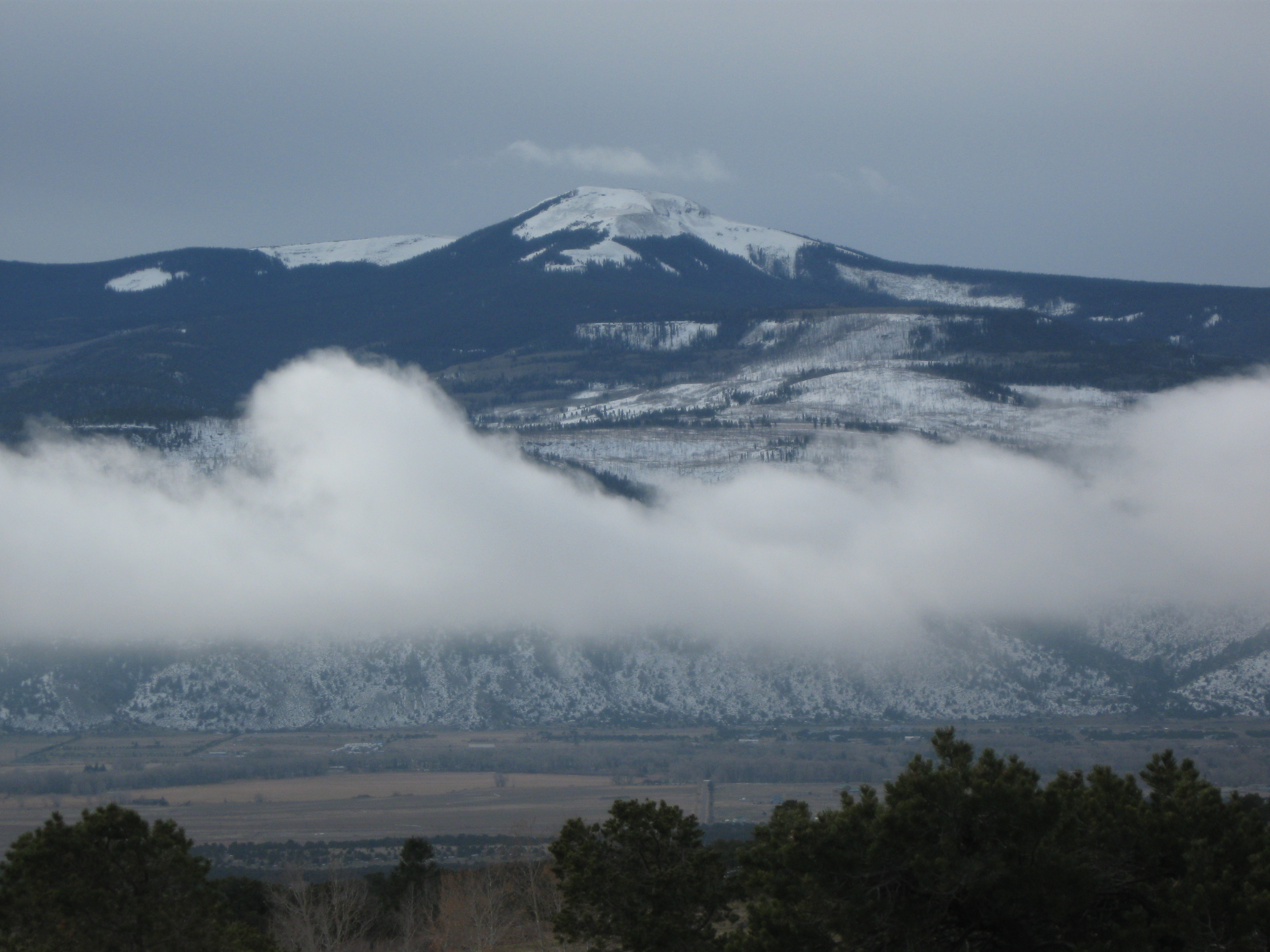
Del Norte Peak rises above the town several miles to the west.

Relatively-speaking, it is located where the Rio Grande leaves the San Juan Mountains and enters the San Luis Valley, near its confluences with Pinos Creek and San Francisco Creek, respectively. Due to its location on the western edge of the valley, a variety of climates, vegetation regions, and ecosystems transition into each other at or around Del Norte. Within a twenty mile radius of the town, from alpine tundra, montane forests, to high-altitude desert. Common vegetation around Del Norte ranges from coniferous pine trees, deciduous aspen trees and cottonwoods, to sagebrush and cacti. During the warmer months of the year, hollyhock, cosmos, poppies, and sunflowers are frequently found around the town. Lookout Mountain (also known to locals as 'D' Mountain) overlooks the town, and is perhaps its most notable landmark. The classification of 'mountain' has been a misnomer, considering that 'D' Mountain has a mild prominence from the rest of the town (approximately 591 feet), and that there is nearby terrain with much greater prominence; however, the classification has stuck since early settlement.

At the 2020 United States census, the town had a total area of 629 acres (2.547 km^{2}), all of it land.

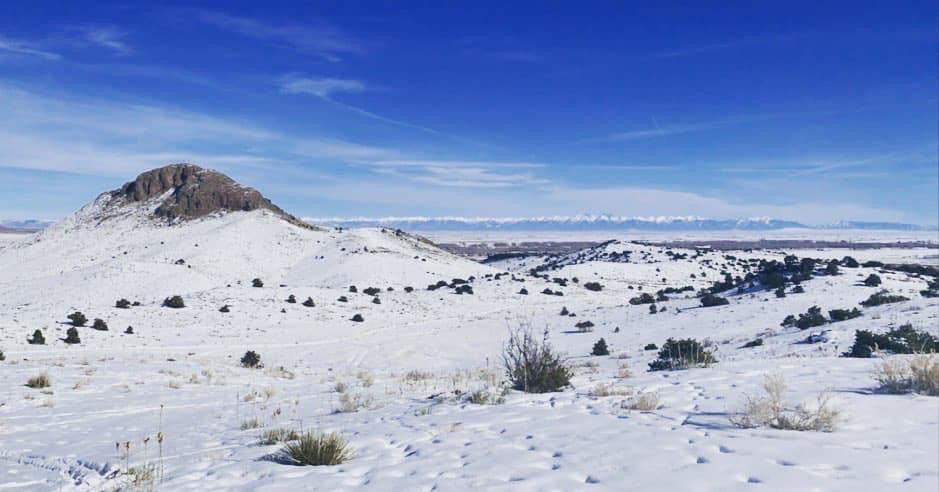
Winter time on the Pronghorn Trail just south of Del Norte, looking east towards 'D' Mountain, the Sangres, and the Sand Dunes.

=== Climate ===
Like most places in the San Luis Valley, Del Norte is generally categorized in a semi-arid or a high-altitude desert climate. Precipitation is the main factor that determines this classification year-to-year, as it can fluctuate from as many as 10-12 inches annually in a wetter year, to 6 inches or less during a drought year. One reason precipitation varies greatly year-to-year is because the town is located in a rain shadow created by the San Juan Mountains. Because of this, precipitation is often determined by how strong and intense storm fronts are, and how these fronts move across the area. This explains why Wolf Creek Ski Area, located about 28 miles west of town, receives on average over 400 inches of snow per year, while Del Norte receives about 10% of that amount – about 40 inches of snow annually. Most precipitation falls in the form of rain or snow; hail and sleet are uncommon, but not unheard of. In general, one can expect in Del Norte to experience mild summers and cold winters, with spring and autumn varying between these. Springtime in the area generally includes gusty winds, and many of the year's strongest snowstorms actually happen during this season. Summer monsoons can hit the area as well, beginning in July and continuing through the end of September. During summer monsoons, the area generally experiences sunny mornings with clouds and storms moving in during the afternoon, and varying amounts of precipitation ranging from light drizzles of rain to brief, torrential downpours. Like most of Colorado, night time temperatures can drop quickly and intensely, because of the dry climate and the lack of moisture in the air.

Climate data for Del Norte, Colorado, 1991–2020 normals, extremes 1893–present
Month	Jan	Feb	Mar	Apr	May	Jun	Jul	Aug	Sep	Oct	Nov	Dec	Year
Record high °F (°C)	61 (16)	68 (20)	73 (23)	80 (27)	87 (31)	92 (33)	93 (34)	89 (32)	87 (31)	81 (27)	70 (21)	62 (17)	93 (34)
Mean maximum °F (°C)	46.5 (8.1)	51.2 (10.7)	64.5 (18.1)	71.0 (21.7)	77.4 (25.2)	84.7 (29.3)	85.3 (29.6)	83.2 (28.4)	80.2 (26.8)	73.6 (23.1)	60.3 (15.7)	50.0 (10.0)	86.5 (30.3)
Mean daily maximum °F (°C)	34.6 (1.4)	40.2 (4.6)	51.5 (10.8)	59.4 (15.2)	68.1 (20.1)	77.6 (25.3)	80.5 (26.9)	78.5 (25.8)	73.0 (22.8)	62.7 (17.1)	48.6 (9.2)	36.4 (2.4)	59.3 (15.1)
Daily mean °F (°C)	20.9 (−6.2)	26.6 (−3.0)	36.1 (2.3)	43.3 (6.3)	52.1 (11.2)	60.6 (15.9)	65.0 (18.3)	63.5 (17.5)	56.6 (13.7)	46.2 (7.9)	33.1 (0.6)	22.6 (−5.2)	43.9 (6.6)
Mean daily minimum °F (°C)	7.2 (−13.8)	12.9 (−10.6)	20.6 (−6.3)	27.3 (−2.6)	36.1 (2.3)	43.6 (6.4)	49.6 (9.8)	48.5 (9.2)	40.2 (4.6)	29.7 (−1.3)	17.6 (−8.0)	8.9 (−12.8)	28.5 (−1.9)
Mean minimum °F (°C)	−8.0 (−22.2)	−3.6 (−19.8)	4.9 (−15.1)	13.5 (−10.3)	23.2 (−4.9)	32.9 (0.5)	41.5 (5.3)	40.2 (4.6)	27.9 (−2.3)	14.1 (−9.9)	0.9 (−17.3)	−8.0 (−22.2)	−11.9 (−24.4)
Record low °F (°C)	−34 (−37)	−24 (−31)	−16 (−27)	−4 (−20)	10 (−12)	22 (−6)	32 (0)	30 (−1)	15 (−9)	2 (−17)	−20 (−29)	−26 (−32)	−34 (−37)
Average precipitation inches (mm)	0.36 (9.1)	0.39 (9.9)	0.72 (18)	0.79 (20)	0.80 (20)	0.60 (15)	1.50 (38)	1.66 (42)	1.06 (27)	0.81 (21)	0.48 (12)	0.51 (13)	9.68 (245)
Average snowfall inches (cm)	5.3 (13)	5.7 (14)	8.2 (21)	5.0 (13)	1.3 (3.3)	0.0 (0.0)	0.0 (0.0)	0.0 (0.0)	0.0 (0.0)	2.5 (6.4)	4.8 (12)	5.8 (15)	38.6 (97.7)
Average extreme snow depth inches (cm)	5.7 (14)	5.6 (14)	4.3 (11)	2.9 (7.4)	1.2 (3.0)	0.0 (0.0)	0.0 (0.0)	0.0 (0.0)	0.0 (0.0)	1.7 (4.3)	3.4 (8.6)	4.8 (12)	9.4 (24)
Average precipitation days (≥ 0.01 in)	3.4	4.1	5.1	4.8	5.7	5.1	10.8	12.7	7.6	5.0	3.7	3.9	71.9
Average snowy days (≥ 0.1 in)	3.6	4.0	4.0	2.4	0.6	0.0	0.0	0.0	0.0	1.0	2.8	4.2	22.6
Source 1: NOAA
Source 2: National Weather Service

== Demographics ==
Historical population
Census	Pop.	Note	%±
1880	729		—
1890	736		1.0%
1900	705		−4.2%
1910	840		19.1%
1920	1,007		19.9%
1930	1,410		40.0%
1940	1,923		36.4%
1950	2,048		6.5%
1960	1,856		−9.4%
1970	1,569		−15.5%
1980	1,709		8.9%
1990	1,674		−2.0%
2000	1,705		1.9%
2010	1,686		−1.1%
2020	1,458		−13.5%
U.S. Decennial Census

=== 2020 census ===
As of the 2020 census, Del Norte had a population of 1,458. The median age was 44.9 years. 20.0% of residents were under the age of 18 and 24.1% of residents were 65 years of age or older. For every 100 females, there were 98.4 males, and for every 100 females age 18 and over, there were 97.5 males age 18 and over.

0.0% of residents lived in urban areas, while 100.0% lived in rural areas.

There were 633 households in Del Norte, of which 25.9% had children under the age of 18 living in them. Of all households, 37.9% were married-couple households, 24.6% were households with a male householder and no spouse or partner present, and 30.3% were households with a female householder and no spouse or partner present. About 37.2% of all households were made up of individuals and 19.3% had someone living alone who was 65 years of age or older.

There were 812 housing units, of which 22.0% were vacant. The homeowner vacancy rate was 1.6% and the rental vacancy rate was 16.9%.

Racial composition as of the 2020 census
Race	Number	Percent
White	961	65.9%
Black or African American	6	0.4%
American Indian and Alaska Native	31	2.1%
Asian	1	0.1%
Native Hawaiian and Other Pacific Islander	2	0.1%
Some other race	201	13.8%
Two or more races	256	17.6%
Hispanic or Latino (of any race)	706	48.4%

=== 2000 census ===
As of the 2000 census, there were 1,705 people, 657 households, and 446 families residing in the town. The population density was 2,004.4 inhabitants per square mile (773.9/km^{2}). There were 736 housing units at an average density of 865.2 per square mile (334.1/km^{2}). The racial makeup of the town was 66.86% White, 0.12% African American, 1.06% Native American, 0.41% Asian, 27.68% from other races, and 3.87% from two or more races. Hispanic or Latino of any race were 57.36% of the population.

There were 657 households, out of which 35.3% had children under the age of 18 living with them, 47.9% were married couples living together, 15.4% had a female householder with no husband present, and 32.1% were non-families. 29.4% of all households were made up of individuals, and 14.9% had someone living alone who was 65 years of age or older. The average household size was 2.57 and the average family size was 3.19.

In the town, the population was spread out, with 30.2% under the age of 18, 9.4% from 18 to 24, 24.8% from 25 to 44, 22.9% from 45 to 64, and 12.8% who were 65 years of age or older. The median age was 35 years. For every 100 females, there were 94.6 males. For every 100 females age 18 and over, there were 90.7 males.

The median income for a household in the town was $23,833, and the median income for a family was $29,471. Males had a median income of $26,161 versus $21,406 for females. The per capita income for the town was $12,751. About 22.1% of families and 25.4% of the population were below the poverty line, including 36.5% of those under age 18 and 14.0% of those age 65 or over.

== Notable people born here ==
- Alva B. Adams - US senator representing Colorado.
- Kent Rominger - astronaut, attended Del Norte High School.

== Gallery ==
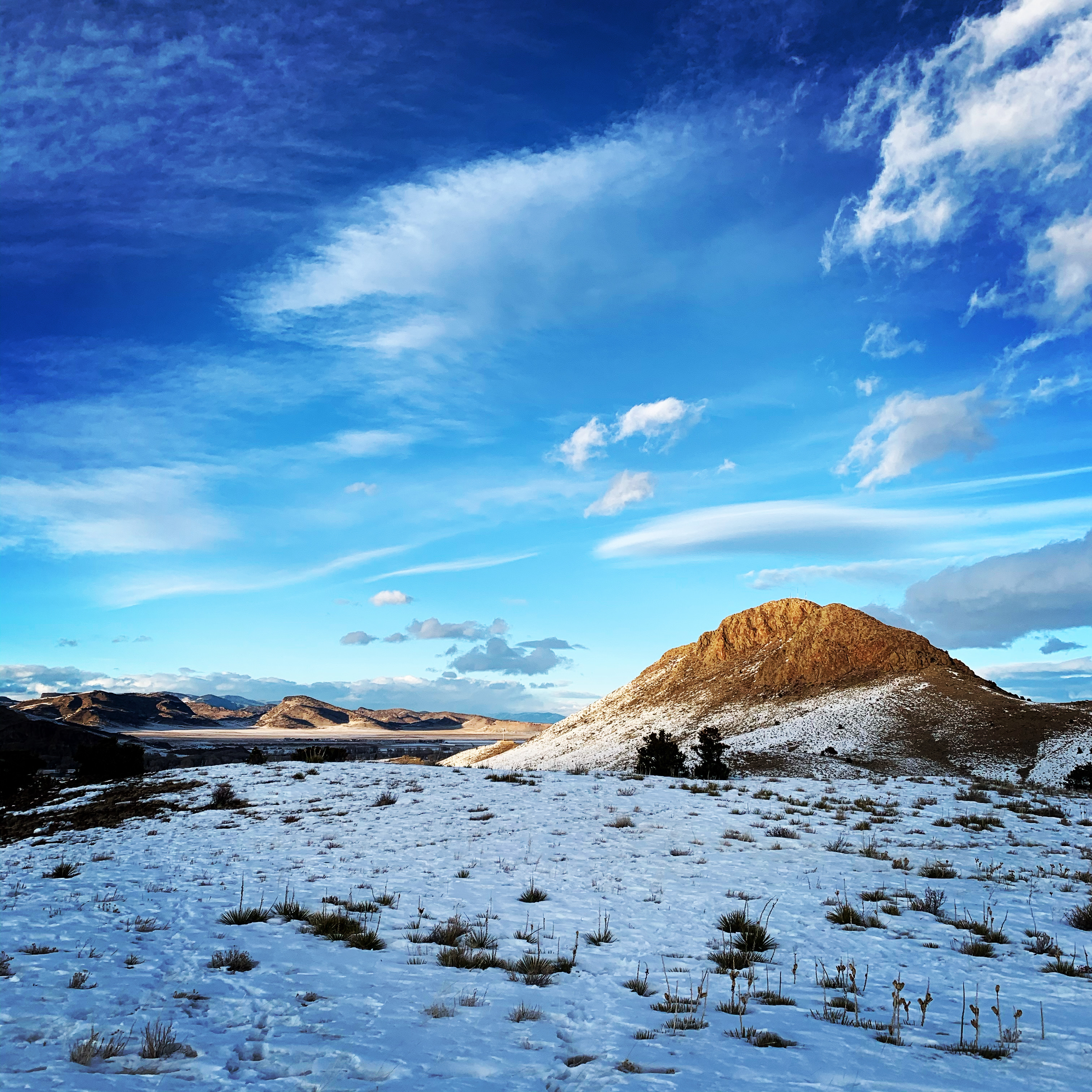
Sunset on 'D' Mountain near Del Norte, Colorado.

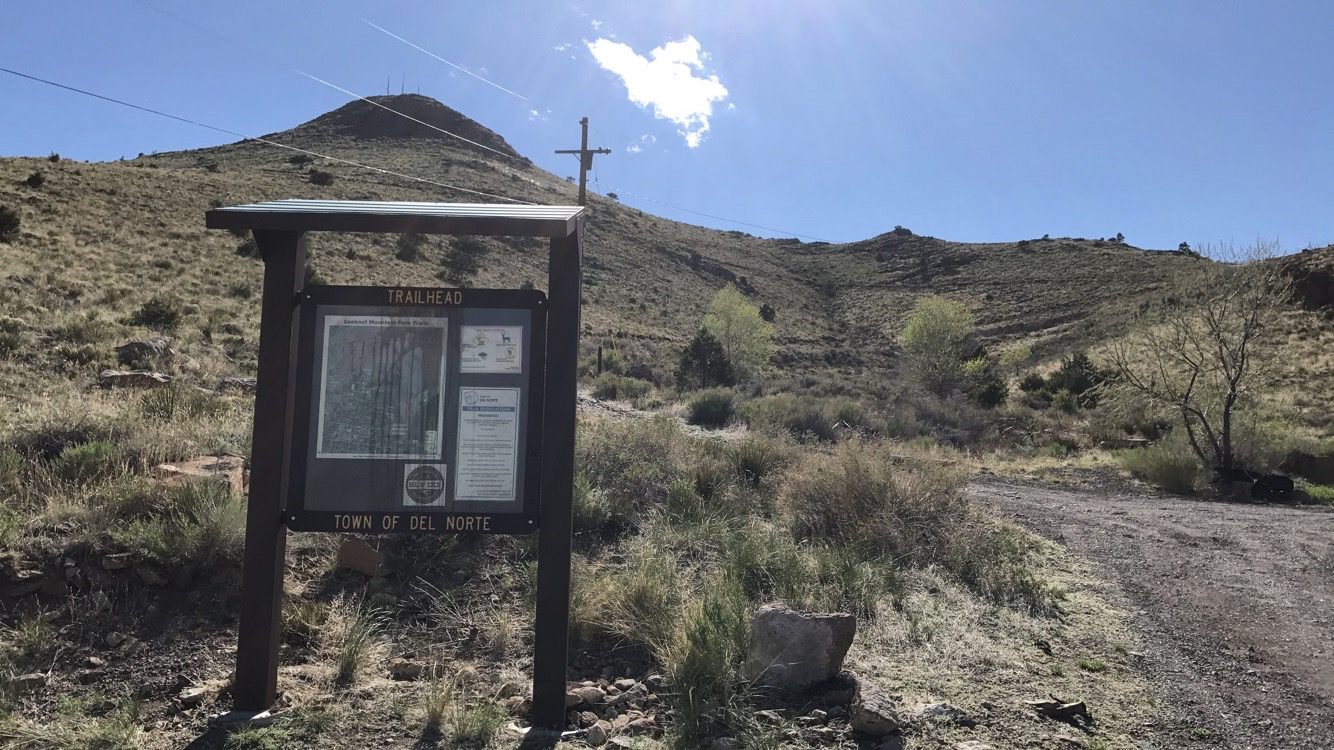
Columbia trailhead on the Lookout Mountain trail system.

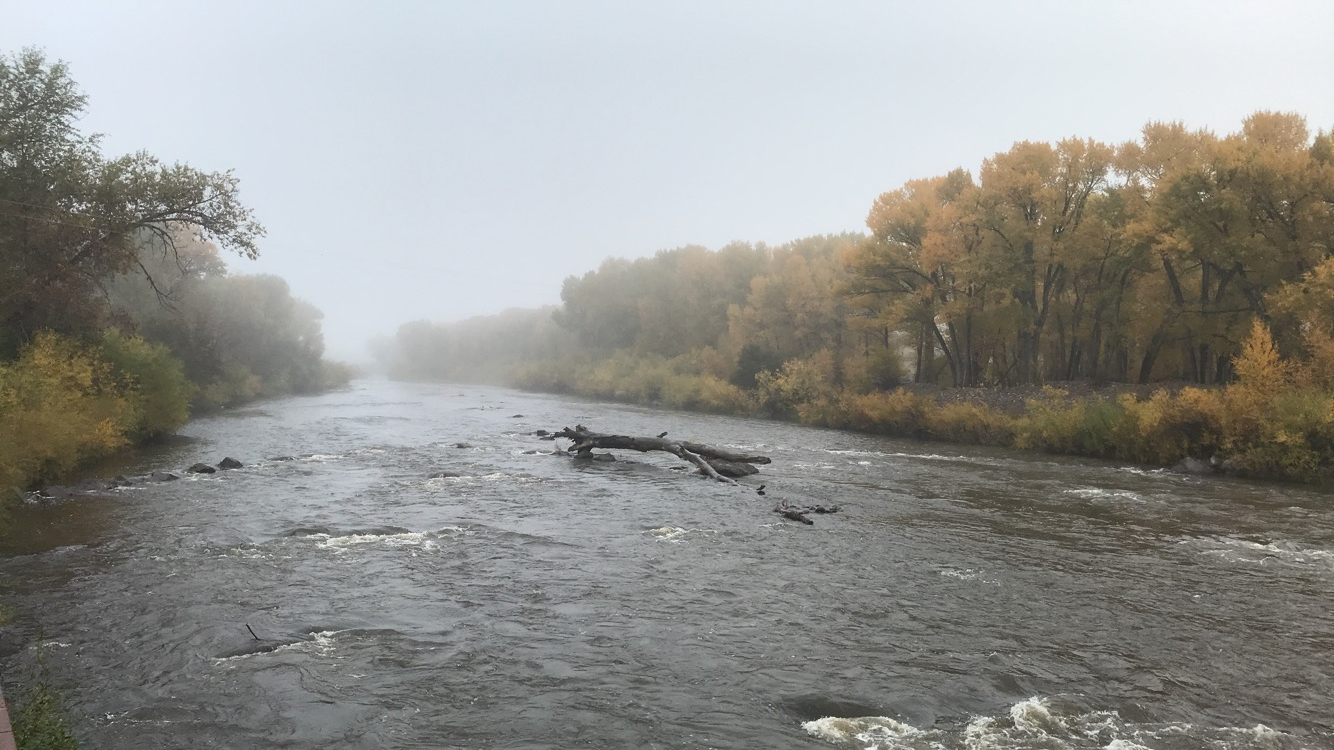
The river walk along the Rio Grande in Del Norte, Colorado.

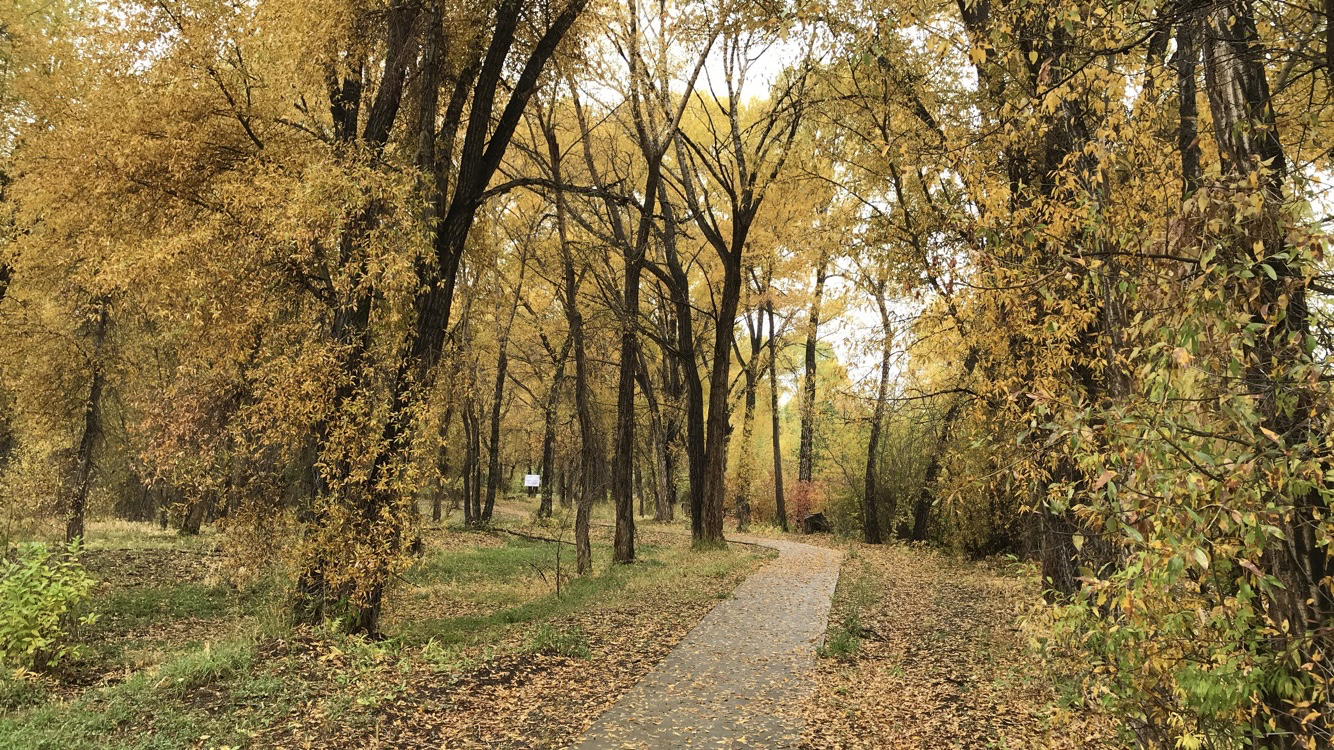
Cottonwood trees in fall colors along the river walk.

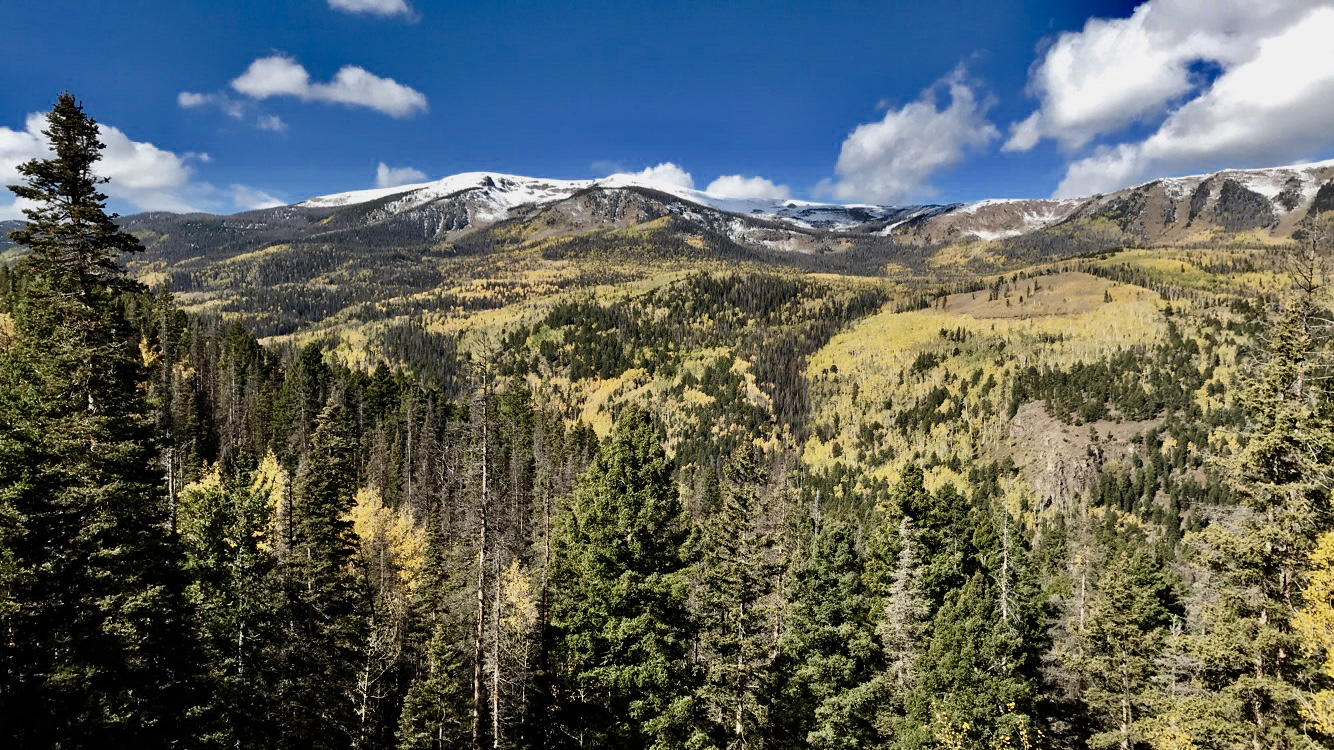
The South San Juan Mountains during the Autumn, just a few miles from town.

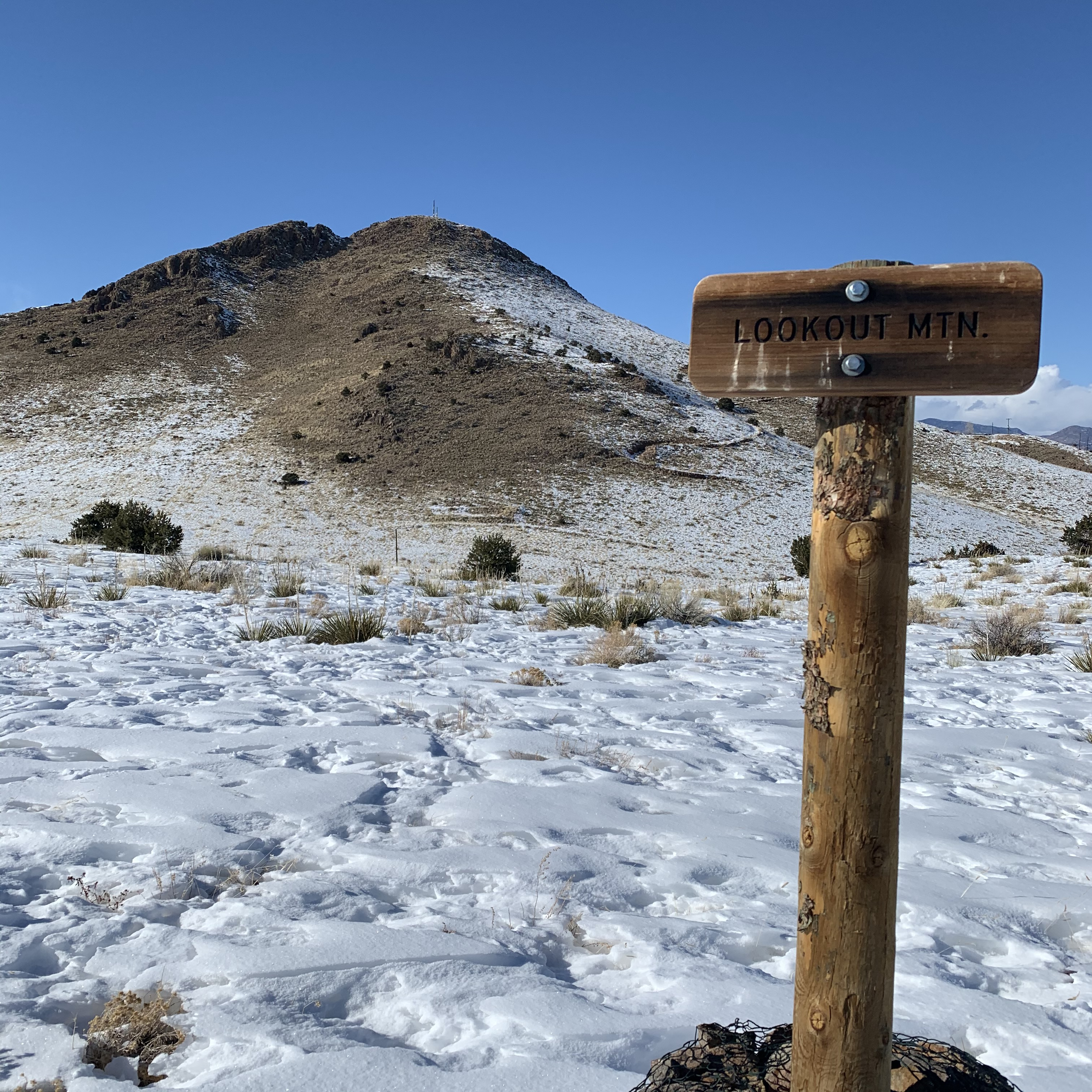
A trail marker along the School Loop of the Lookout Mountain trail system.

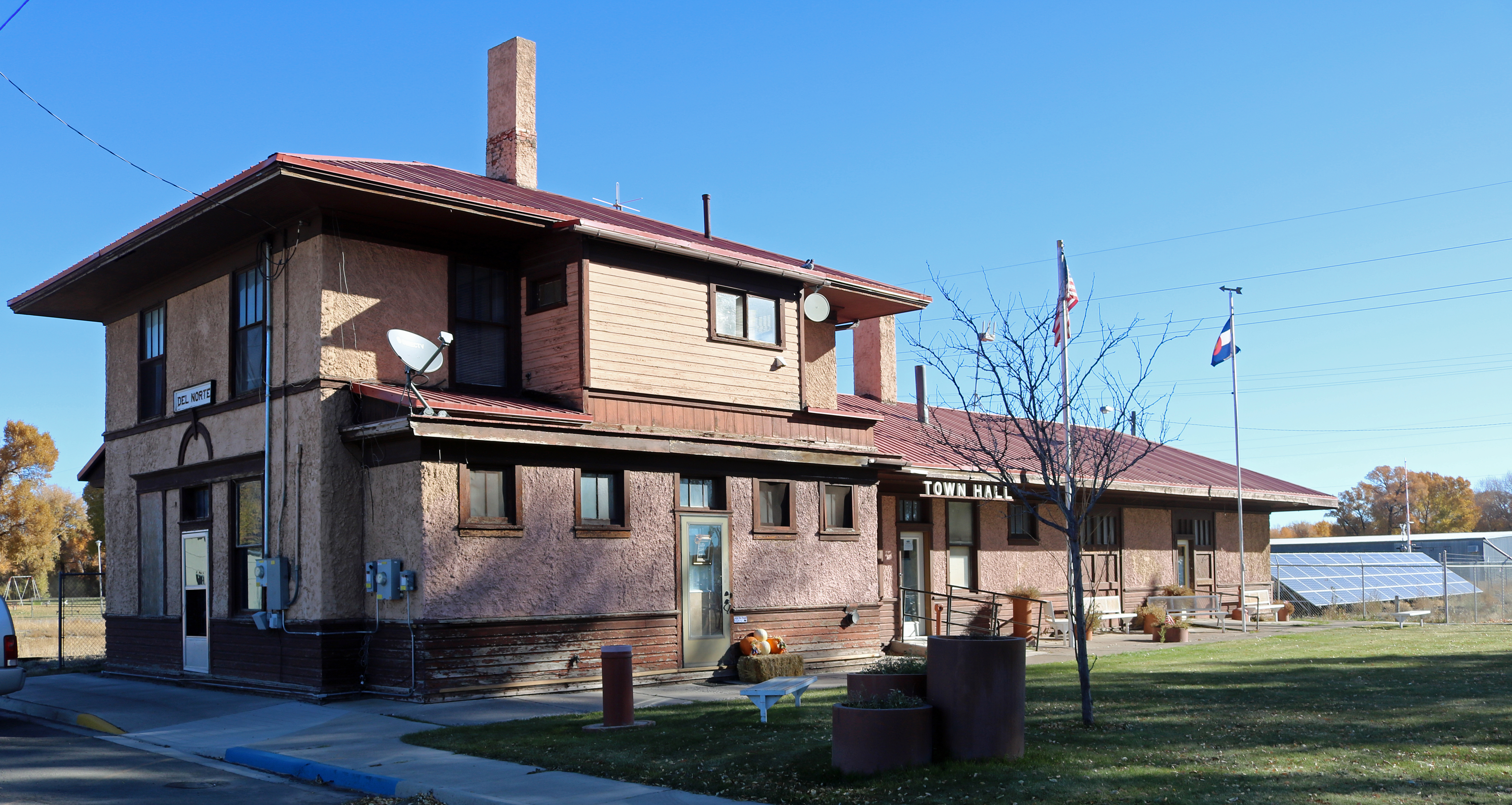
Del Norte Town Hall

== See also ==
- List of county seats in Colorado
- San Luis Valley
