= South Fork, Colorado =

Town in Colorado, United States

Town of South Fork, Colorado
- Town
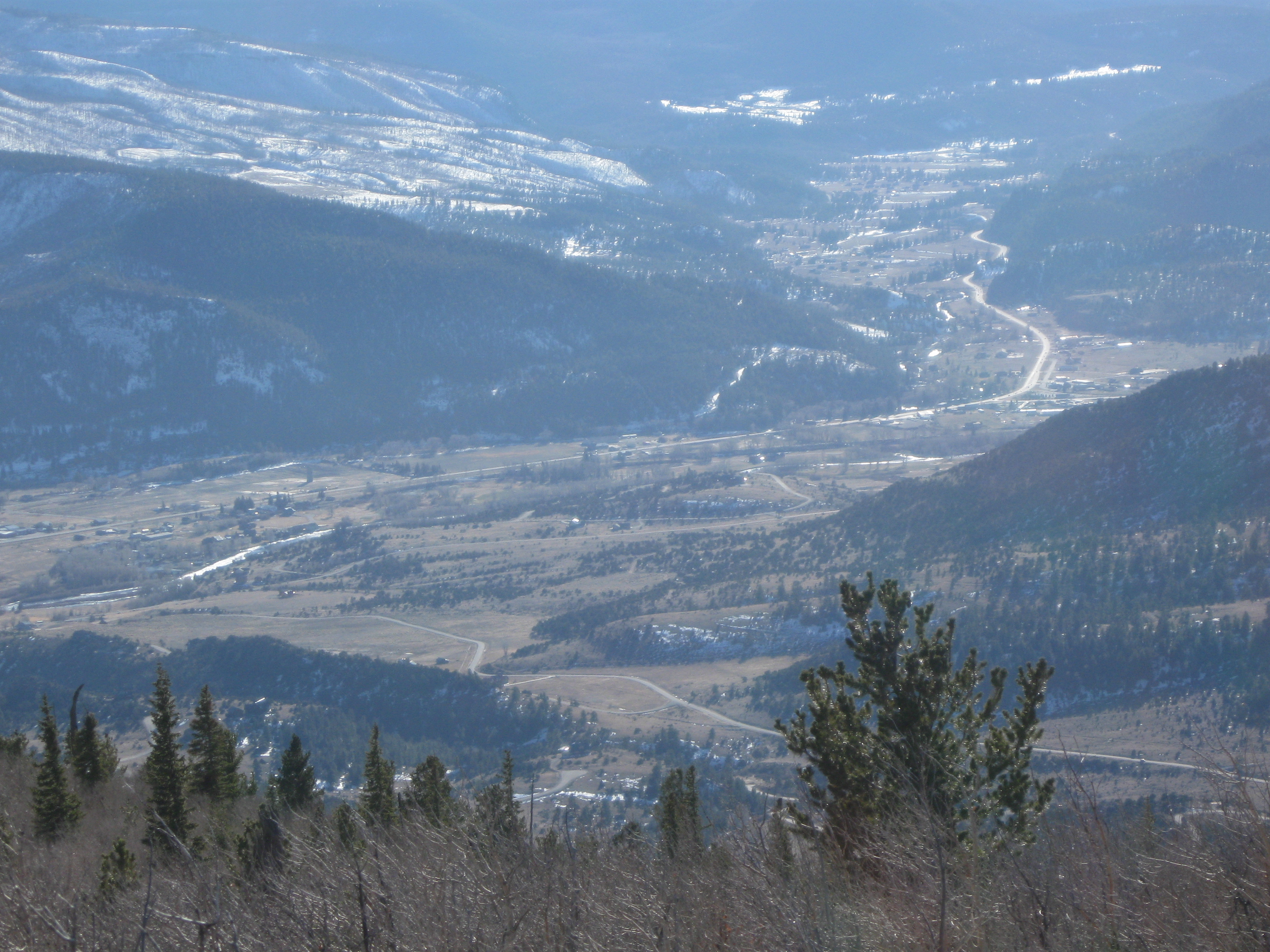
- South Fork as seen from the summit of Agua Ramon Mountain

- Location of South Fork in Rio Grande County, Colorado.
- Coordinates: 37°40′18″N 106°37′40″W
- Country: United States
- State: Colorado
- County: Rio Grande County
- Incorporated: May 19, 1992

Government
  - Type: Statutory Town

Area
  - Total: 2.50 sq mi (6.47 km^{2})
  - Land: 2.50 sq mi (6.47 km^{2})
  - Water: 0 sq mi (0.00 km^{2})
- Elevation: 8,216 ft (2,504 m)

Population (2020)
  - Total: 510
  - Density: 200/sq mi (79/km^{2})
- Time zone: UTC-7 (Mountain (MST))
  - Summer (DST): UTC-6 (MDT)
- ZIP code: 81154
- Area code: 719
- FIPS code: 08-72395
- GNIS feature ID: 2413307
- Website: Town of South Fork

South Fork is a statutory town in Rio Grande County, Colorado, United States. It lies at the confluence of the South Fork and Rio Grande rivers. The population was 510 at the 2020 census.

== Geography ==
According to the United States Census Bureau, the town has a total area of 2.4 square miles (6.2 km^{2}), all land.

== History ==
South Fork was once the site of timber milling operations.

South Fork was founded in 1882, by which date its location was already marked by the presence of a coaching post, dating from the construction of the railroad connection of the Rio Grande Western Railroad line to Creede, which had been built to support the Creede silver mine. It was only in 1992 that South Fork achieved independent statutory town status, making it the youngest statutory town in the state. Originally the principal economic activities involved forestry and mining, but in recent decades these have been overtaken in the employment statistics by tourism.

South Fork made Colorado headlines during the Summer of 2020 when its town board announced that solicitations for donations was unlawful within town limits. This was in response to a local farmer's market in which one of its vendors was asking people for donations to the Black Lives Matter movement and the NAACP.

== Demographics ==
Historical population
Census	Pop.	Note	%±
2000	604		—
2010	386		−36.1%
2020	510		32.1%

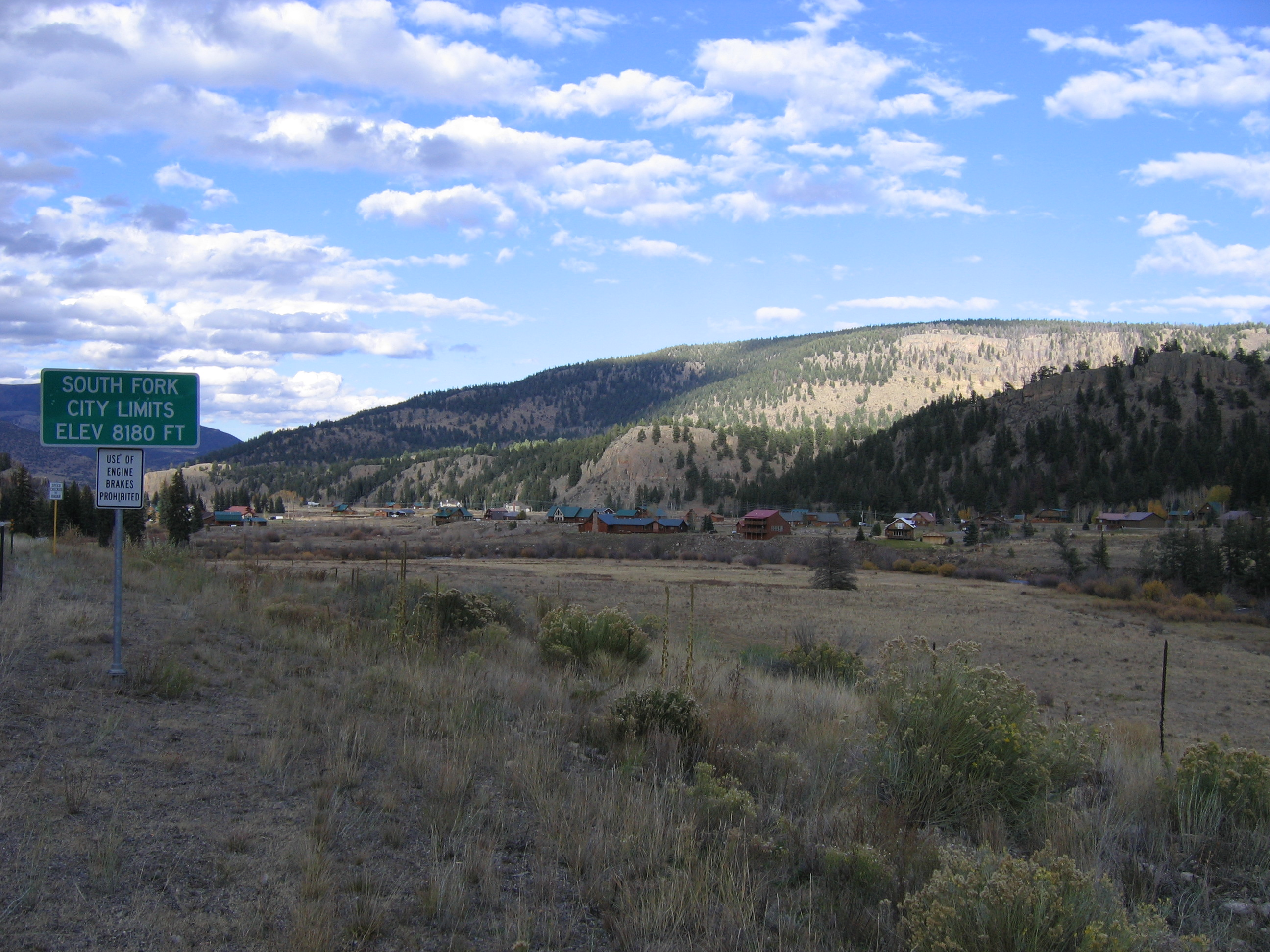
Housing on the outskirts of town

South Fork has about 600 permanent residents, but a substantially larger summer population due to seasonal residents and visitors.

== See also ==
- San Juan Mountains
