= Palace Hotel =

Palace Hotel may refer to:

== Film ==
- Palace Hotel (film)

== Places ==
=== Australia ===
- Palace Hotel, Broken Hill, New South Wales, a pub
- Palace Hotel, Childers, Queensland
- Palace Hotel, Perth, Western Australia
- Palace Hotel, Kalgoorlie, Western Australia

=== China ===
- Peace Hotel South Building, formerly Palace Hotel, Shanghai

=== Denmark ===
- Palace Hotel (Copenhagen)

=== Egypt ===
- Sofitel Winter Palace Hotel, Luxor

=== Finland ===
- Palace Hotel, Helsinki

=== Hungary ===
- Palace Hotel, Miskolc-Lillafüred, Hungary

=== Japan ===
- Palace Hotel, Tokyo

=== Palestine ===
- Palace Hotel (Jerusalem)

=== Poland ===
- Palace, a hotel in Poland used by the Gestapo during the Nazi occupation, where Jadwiga Apostoł was brought

=== Portugal ===
- Buçaco Palace, Serra do Buçaco, Mealhada

=== Romania ===
- Athenee Palace Hilton Bucharest Hotel

=== Russia ===
- Palace Hotel, Rostov-on-Don

=== Slovenia ===
- Hotel Palace Portorož

=== Switzerland ===
- Badrutt's Palace Hotel, St. Moritz, Switzerland

=== Turkey ===
- Mardan Palace, Lara, Antalya

=== United Kingdom ===
- Palace Hotel, Bristol, a pub
- Palace Hotel, Buxton
- Palace Hotel, London, now part of 1 Palace Street
- Birkdale Palace Hotel, Lancashire
- Regent Palace Hotel, London
- Strand Palace Hotel, London
- The Principal Manchester, previously Palace Hotel, Manchester

=== United States ===
- Palace Hotel, San Francisco, California
  - Palace Hotel Residential Tower
- Palace Hotel (Ukiah, California), listed on the National Register of Historic Places (NRHP) in Mendocino County, California
- Palace Hotel (Antonito, Colorado), listed on the NRHP in Conejos County, Colorado
- Palace Hotel (Cripple Creek, Colorado), a location in an episode of Haunted History
- Brown Palace Hotel (Denver, Colorado)
- Palace Hotel (Butler, Missouri), listed on the NRHP in Missouri
- Palace Hotel (Springfield, Missouri), listed on the NRHP in Greene County, Missouri
- Palace Hotel (Missoula, Montana)
- Palace Hotel (Gallup, New Mexico), listed on the NRHP in McKinley County, New Mexico
- Lotte New York Palace Hotel, New York
- Cincinnatian Hotel, formerly Palace Hotel, Cincinnati, Ohio
- Lane Hotel (Eugene, Oregon), listed on the NRHP as Palace Hotel
- Palace Hotel, Heppner, Oregon (destroyed)
- Brown Palace Hotel (Mobridge, South Dakota)
- Palace Hotel (Houston), Texas, listed on the NRHP
- Palace Hotel (Port Townsend, Washington)

== See also ==
- Palace (disambiguation)
- South Shore Cultural Center, Chicago, Illinois, used as a set for the Palace Hotel Ballroom in The Blues Brothers
