= National Register of Historic Places listings in Conejos County, Colorado =

Location of Conejos County in Colorado

This is a list of the National Register of Historic Places listings in Conejos County, Colorado.

This is intended to be a complete list of the properties and districts on the National Register of Historic Places in Conejos County, Colorado, United States. The locations of National Register properties and districts for which the latitude and longitude coordinates are included below, may be seen in a map.

There are 15 properties and districts listed on the National Register in the county, including 2 National Historic Landmark.

This National Park Service list is complete through NPS recent listings posted September 25, 2026.

== Current listings ==
	Name on the Register	Image	Date listed	Location	City or town	Description
1	Costilla Crossing Bridge	Costilla Crossing Bridge	February 4, 1985 (#85000194)	County Road over the Rio Grande; 37°04′43″N 105°45′22″W	Antonito	Built 1892, rehabilitated 2006
2	Denver & Rio Grande Railroad San Juan Extension	Denver & Rio Grande Railroad San Juan Extension	February 6, 1973 (#73000462)	Between Antonito and Chama, New Mexico via Cumbres Pass; 36°51′56″N 106°23′56″W	Antonito	Now a scenic railway, the Cumbres and Toltec Scenic Railroad; extends into Archuleta County
3	Engine No. 463	Engine No. 463	May 12, 1975 (#75000502)	Off U.S. Route 285; 37°04′12″N 106°00′38″W	Antonito	
4	Garcia-Espinosa-Garland Ranch Headquarters		December 31, 2018 (#100003274)	7527 County Rd. 16; 37°06′10″N 105°57′35″W	Antonito	
5	La Jara Depot	La Jara Depot	May 12, 1975 (#75000503)	Broadway and Main Sts. 37°16′31″N 105°57′35″W	La Jara	
6	La Sala de las Mujeres		April 17, 2026 (#100012918)	611 Main Street; 37°04′39″N 106°00′32″W	Antonito	
7	McIntire Ranch	McIntire Ranch	March 26, 2008 (#08000204)	Approximately 1.5 miles (2.4 km) north of County Road V 37°16′50″N 105°49′05″W	Sanford	
8	Our Lady of Guadalupe Church	Our Lady of Guadalupe Church	December 17, 2018 (#100003275)	6631-33 County Road 13; 37°05′18″N 106°01′13″W	Conejos	
9	Palace Hotel	Palace Hotel	August 19, 1994 (#94001013)	429 Main St. 37°04′35″N 106°00′30″W	Antonito	
10	Pike's Stockade	Pike's Stockade	October 15, 1966 (#66000244)	4 miles east of Sanford on State Highway 136; 37°17′37″N 105°48′36″W	Sanford	
11	Rio Grande Engine No. 168	Rio Grande Engine No. 168	August 10, 1979 (#79000601)	5234B U.S. 285; 37°04′07″N 106°00′50″W	Antonito	
12	Ruybal Homestead		August 12, 2026 (#100013296)	Address Restricted	Antonito	
13	S.P.M.D.T.U. Concilio Superior	S.P.M.D.T.U. Concilio Superior	March 29, 2001 (#01000322)	603 Main St. 37°04′35″N 106°00′30″W	Antonito	
14	St. Joseph's Church	St. Joseph's Church	December 31, 2018 (#100003276)	19895 County Road 8; 37°16′55″N 106°06′42″W	Capulin	
15	Warshauer Mansion	Warshauer Mansion	August 30, 1974 (#74000564)	515 River St. 37°04′34″N 106°00′36″W	Antonito	

== See also ==
- List of National Historic Landmarks in Colorado
- List of National Register of Historic Places in Colorado
- Bibliography of Colorado
- Geography of Colorado
- History of Colorado
- Index of Colorado-related articles
- List of Colorado-related lists
- Outline of Colorado
