= SHUAA Capital =

Asset management and investment banking firm of UAE

SHUAA Capital psc
- Company type: Public
- Traded as: DFM: SHUAA
- Industry: Financial services.
- Founded: 1979; 47 years ago
- Headquarters: Dubai, United Arab Emirates
- Key people: Jassim Alseddiqi (MD); Fawad Tariq Khan (CEO); Bechara Raad (COO); Bachir Nawar (CLCO); Ajit Vijay Joshi (MD, Head of Public & Private Markets); Natasha Hannoun (Head of Debt); Otto Dreyer (Head of Real Estate Development); Gunshyam Kripa (Finance Director)
- Products: Asset Management; Public Markets; Private Markets; Real Estate; Debt Investments; Investment Banking
- Website: https://www.shuaa.com

SHUAA Capital psc (DFM: SHUAA) is an asset management and investment banking platform.

== History ==
- SHUAA was established in the UAE in 1979 as the Arabian General Investment Corporation (AGICO) by Emiri Decree number 6 of Sheikh Rashid Al Maktoum. Initially, AGICO pooled capital from regional Chambers of Commerce and invested it across the region. The company was listed on the Kuwait Stock Exchange in 1984.
- In 2000, it listed on the Dubai Financial Market.
- In 2001, AGICO completed a name and identity change to SHUAA Capital - SHUAA is the Arabic acronym for Arabian General Investment Company.
- Between the period of 2003 and 2007, SHUAA was involved in a number of IPOs for regional companies including Arabtec, Amlak Finance, Aramex, Petrofac, Air Arabia, Deyaar and DP World
- In 2007 SHUAA opened offices in Saudi Arabia and issued an AED 1.5 billion (US$408.72 million) convertible bond to Dubai Banking Group, which on maturity in October 2008, was to convert to 250 million shares, representing a 32 per cent stake.
- Following the global economic downturn, an agreement on the restructuring of the convertible bond with Dubai Banking Group was reached on 2 September 2009 when 515,000,000 shares were issued to Dubai Banking Group. The agreement was based on revised terms and in consideration for the extinguishment of the issued bond, thus giving the Dubai Banking Group a shareholding of 48.4 per cent in SHUAA.
- In 2010 SHUAA embarked on a restructuring process which included divesting from non-core assets and strengthening its balance sheet.
- SHUAA continued the restructuring of its cost base in 2011 under a management team led by Sheikh Maktoum Hasher Al Maktoum, exiting its retail brokerage division and non-core investments. It also closed some regional branch and representative offices and refocused its research department for institutional clients.
- As a result of the vast restructuring program, SHUAA turned a profit of AED 1.3 million in the second quarter of 2013. On January 13, 2014 the company reported preliminary results for 2013 and a net profit of AED 2.8 million.
- SHUAA Capital (SHUAA) merged with Abu Dhabi Financial Group (ADFG) in 2019 in a transformational merger, creating the leading asset management and investment banking platform in the region.
- SHUAA's audited annual results for 2019 highlighted the company's solid financial performance and ability to sustain revenues and capitalize on growth opportunities, despite the focus on merger and integration activity as well as challenging market conditions and geopolitical uncertainty. The company reported an EBITDA of AED 186 million and a net profit to shareholders of SHUAA Capital of AED 47 million by 31 December 2019.
- In November 2020, SHUAA Capital announced a new partnership that aims to tap into the citizenship-for-investment market, with an initial $118 million real estate fund in Montenegro.
- In 2022, SHUAA was the key investor in Yabi, a financial literacy fintech startup in the MENA region.
