= 1 Palace Street =

Development in Victoria, London, England

Coordinates: 51.499208°N 0.142580°W

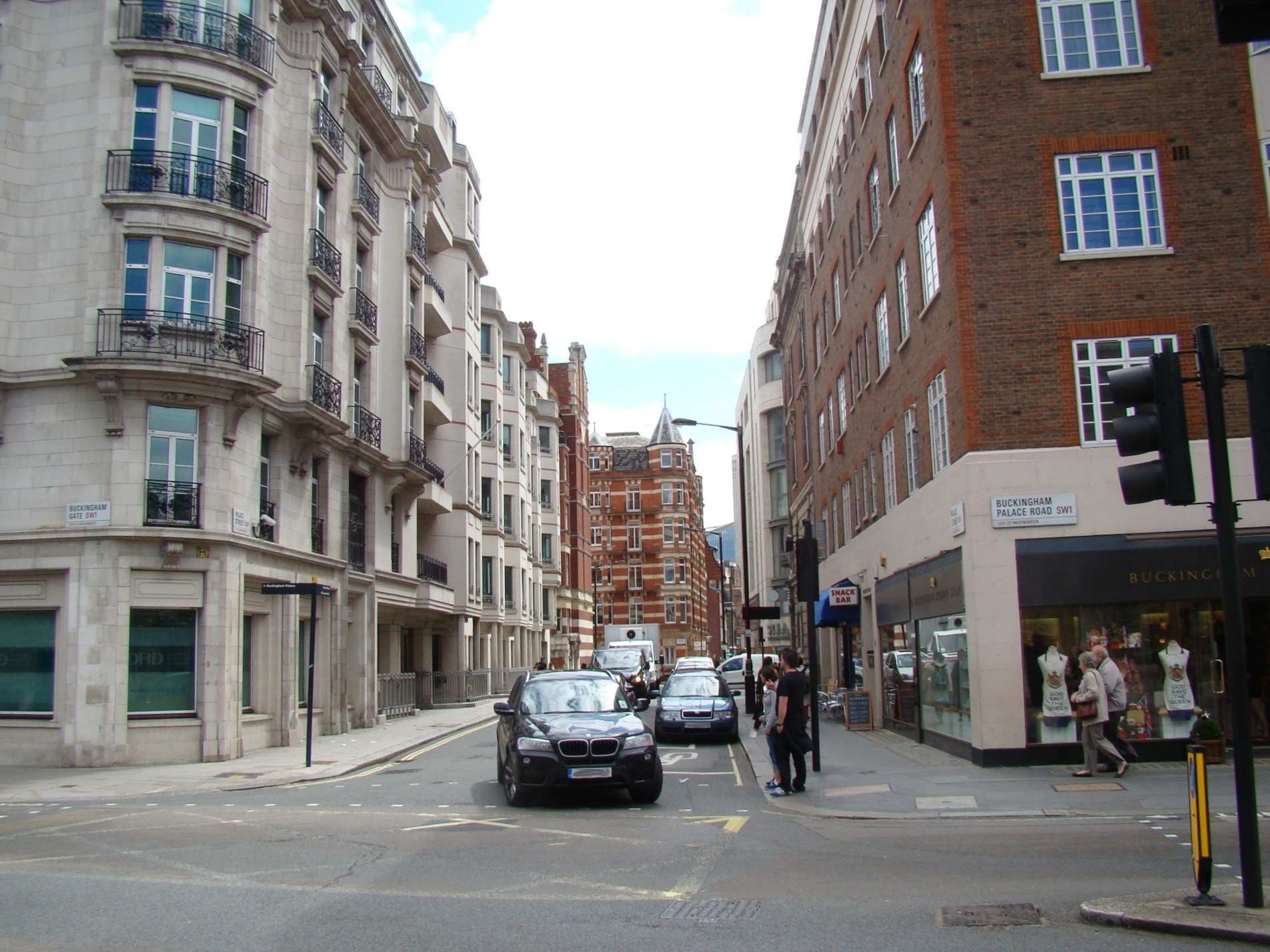
- A photographic image of 1 Palace Street (left) as viewed from Buckingham Palace Road
- Interactive map of the 1 Palace Street area

General information
- Architectural style: Renaissance; Beaux Arts; Queen Anne; Contemporary
- Construction started: 2016
- Topped-out: 16 November 2018

Technical details
- Floor count: 7
- Floor area: 302,377 square feet (28,091.7 m^{2})

Design and construction
- Architecture firm: Squire and Partners
- Developer: Northacre
- Main contractor: Balfour Beatty

Other information
- Number of units: 72

Website
- numberonepalacestreet.com

1 Palace Street is a 302,377 ft^{2} (28,091.7 m^{2}) development on Palace Street in Victoria, London, opposite Buckingham Palace.

Abu Dhabi Financial Group (ADFG) bought the site for £310 million in 2013, and it is being developed by Northacre, which is 70% owned by ADFG. When completed in 2018, it will comprise 72 apartments and incorporate an existing Grade II listed building.

The building facing Buckingham Gate, of which the 1861 facade will be retained was built as the Palace Hotel in the nineteenth century, before becoming offices, as Nobel House. It will be the only residential building to directly overlook the gardens of Buckingham Palace.

The architects are Squire & Partners, and the development will "reflect five architectural styles: 1860s Italianate Renaissance, 1880s French Renaissance, 1880s French Beaux Arts, 1890s Queen Anne, and contemporary".

In November 2015, it was reported by The Guardian that one of the apartments had been pre-sold for £20 million to an unknown buyer.
