= McIntire Ranch =

- U.S. National Register of Historic Places
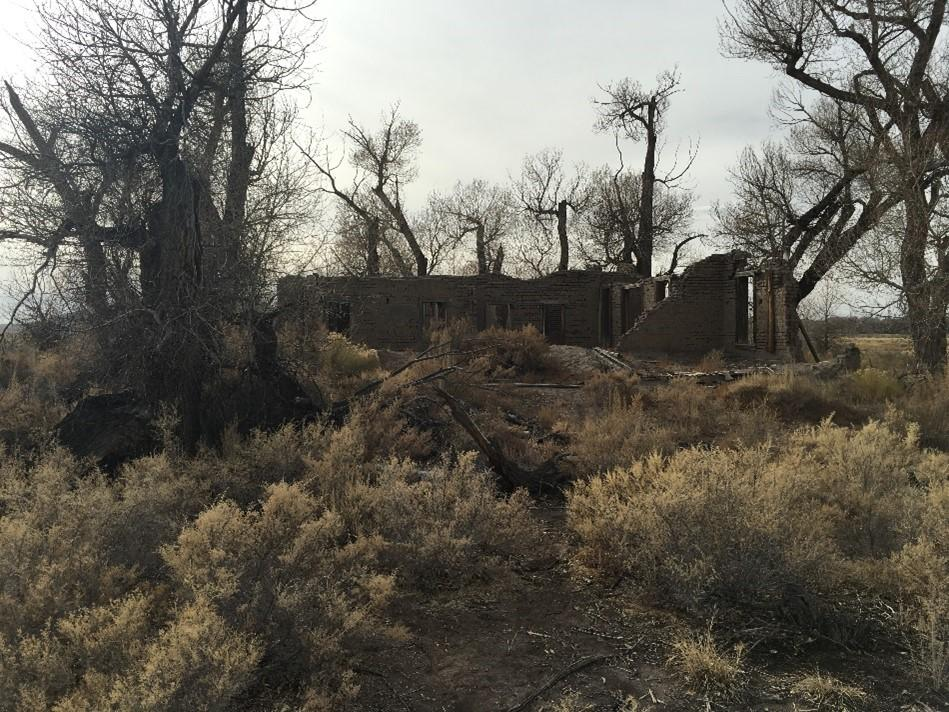
- Ruins of the ranch house in 2019

- Location within Colorado
- Location: Approx. 1.5 mi. N. of Co. Rd. V, Sanford, Colorado
- Coordinates: 37°16′50″N 105°49′05″W
- Area: 14.2 acres (5.7 ha)
- Built: 1880
- Architectural style: Territorial Adobe
- NRHP reference No.: 08000204
- Added to NRHP: March 26, 2008

McIntire Ranch, in Conejos County, Colorado near Sanford, Colorado, was listed on the National Register of Historic Places in 2008. The listing included the remains of ranch buildings on a 14.2 acres (5.7 ha) area. The ranch was developed by Colorado Governor Albert McIntire.

The site is in the southern end of the San Luis Valley on land now administered by the Bureau of Land Management's La Jara Field Office, "on a low, sloping bench that overlooks a series of small ponds to the west in the foreground and the Conejos River in the distance."

The main house was a Territorial Adobe structure built of adobe blocks.

It is located approximately 1.5 miles north of County Road V, and is about 4.5 miles (7.2 km) northeast of Sanford.
