= The Lancasters =

Coordinates: 51.5111°N 0.1819°W

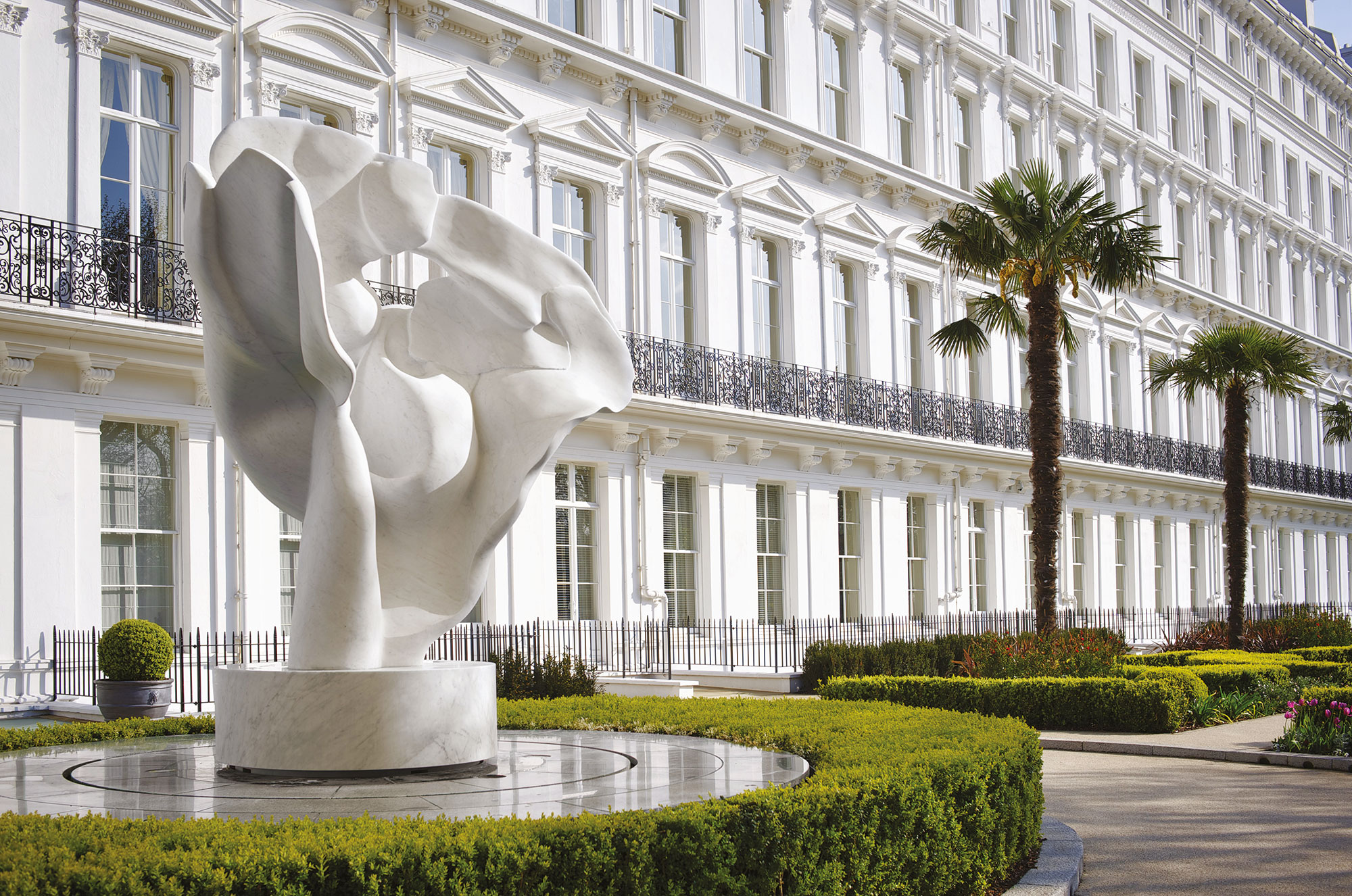
- Interactive map of the The Lancasters area

General information
- Status: Completed
- Location: Bayswater, London, London, England, 75–89 Lancaster Gate, London W2 3NH

Design and construction
- Architect: Nilsson Architects
- Developer: Northacre Plc

The Lancasters is a residential development in London, England, with 77 apartments, the majority of which face south with views onto or across Hyde Park.

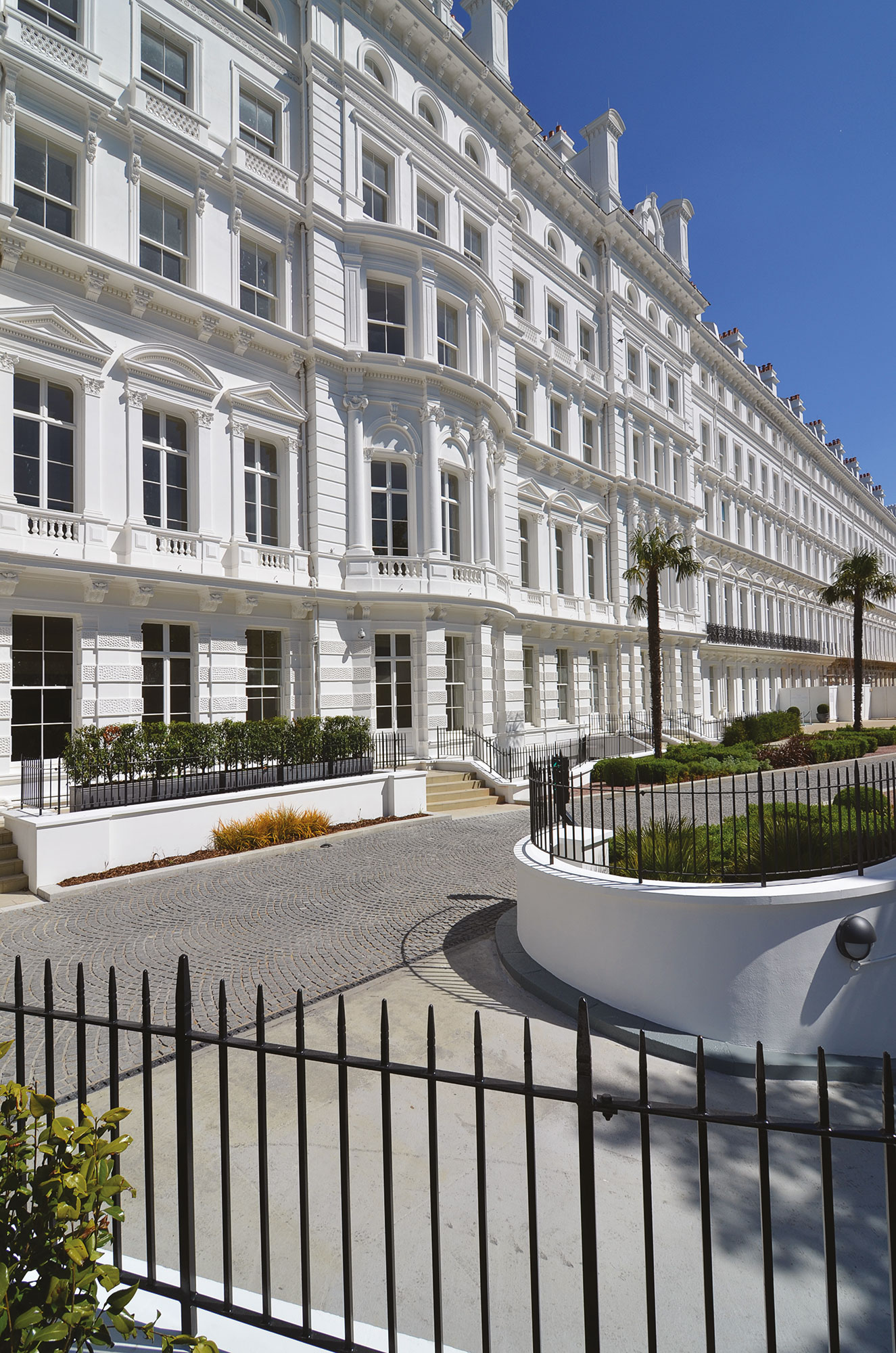
The Lancasters, Bayswater, London

== History ==
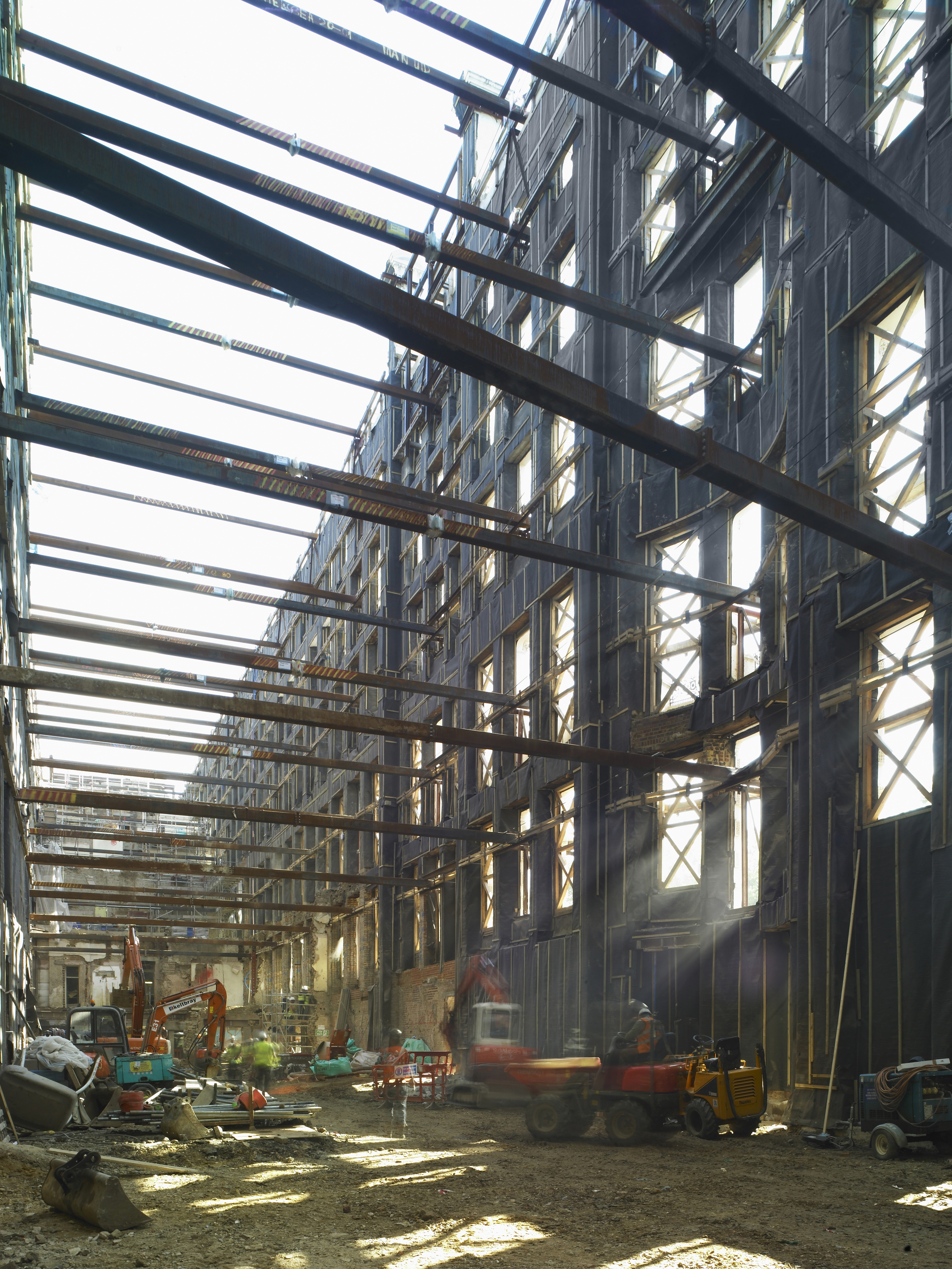
Facade retention work at The Lancasters, Bayswater, London

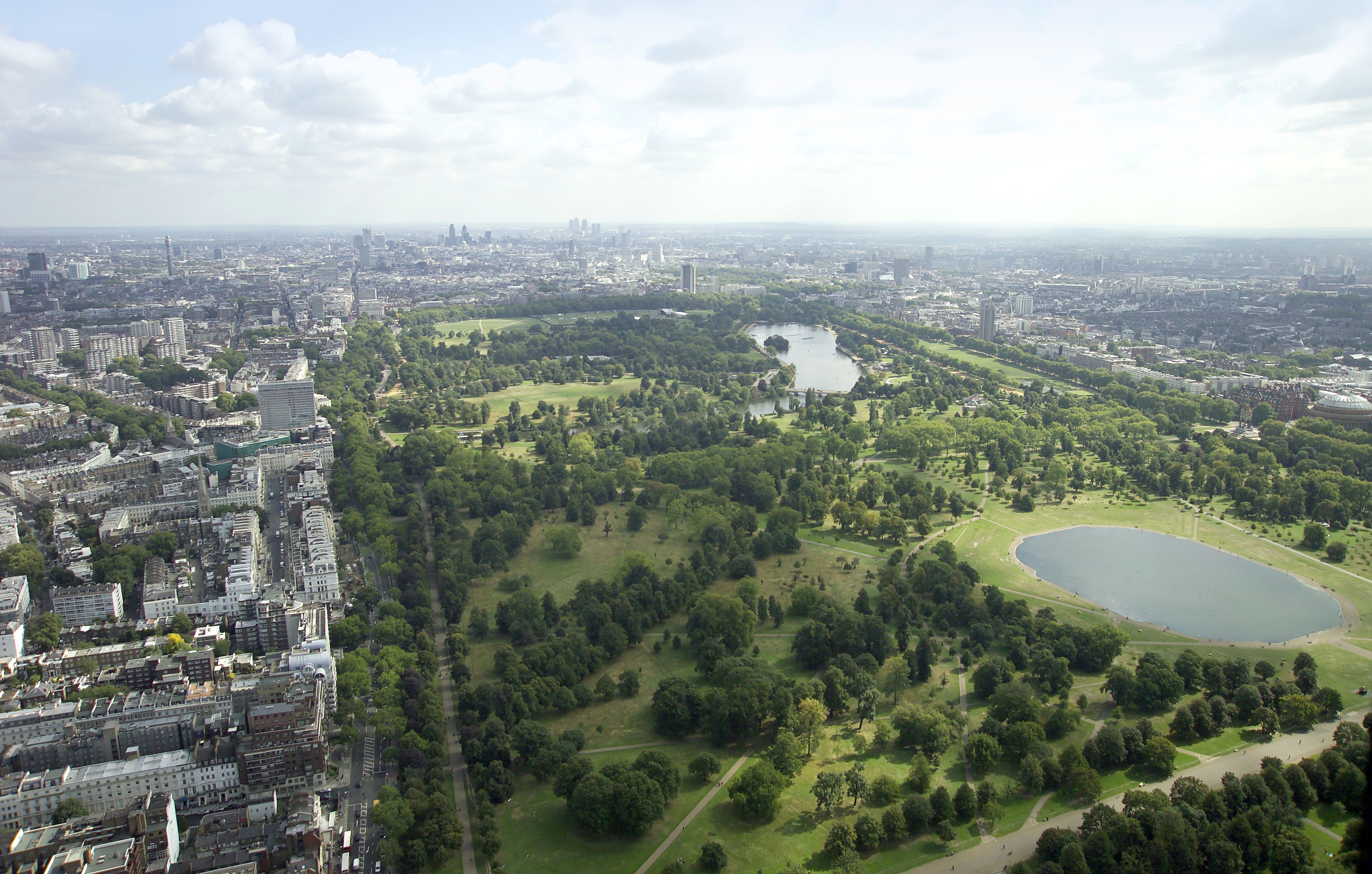
View of Hyde Park and Bayswater, London

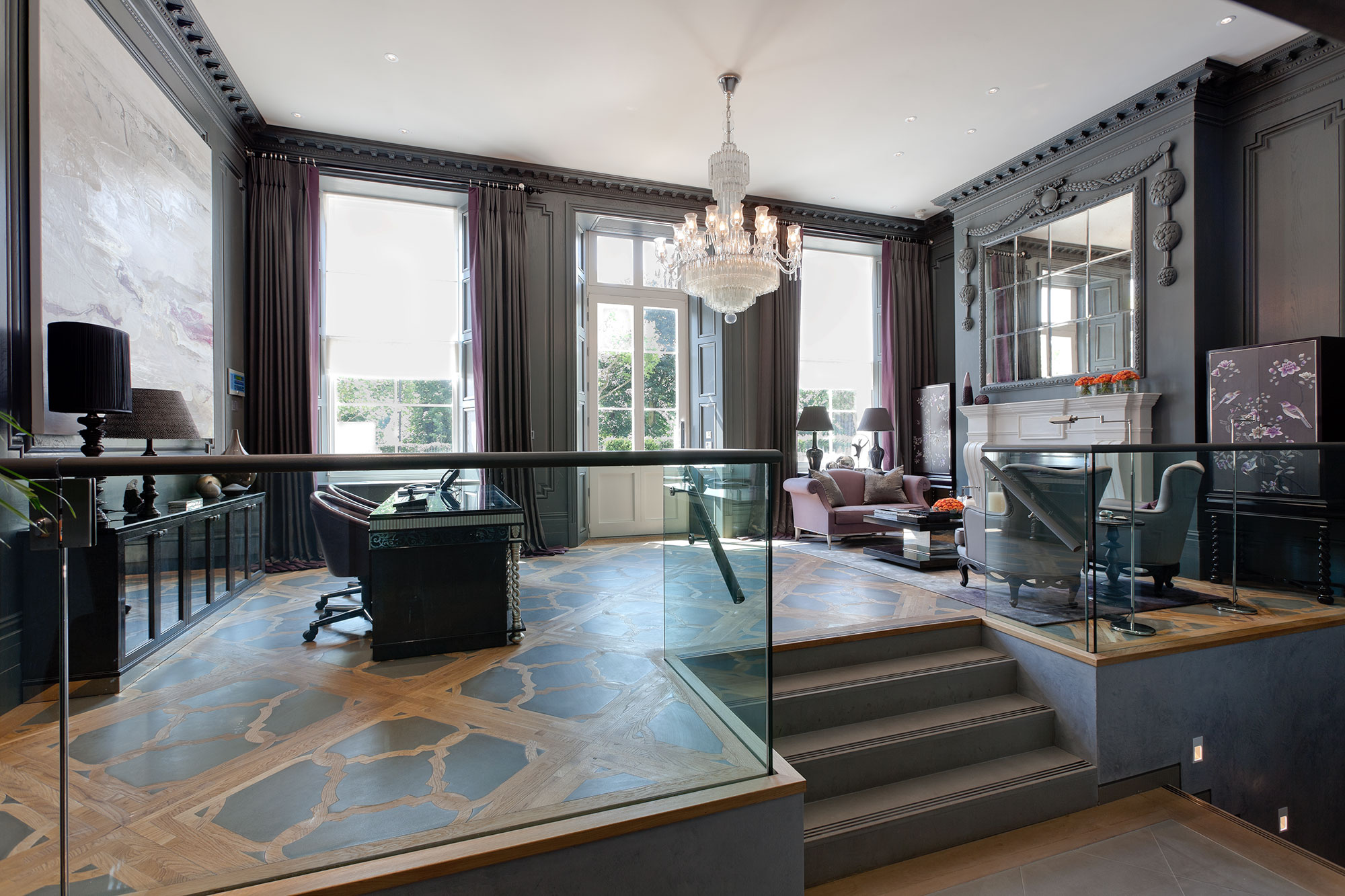
An interior at The Lancasters

The building was originally a terrace of 15 stucco-fronted Grade-II listed houses dating from the mid-nineteenth century. It was purchased by a joint venture between the investment and development company Minerva and the developer Northacre Plc.

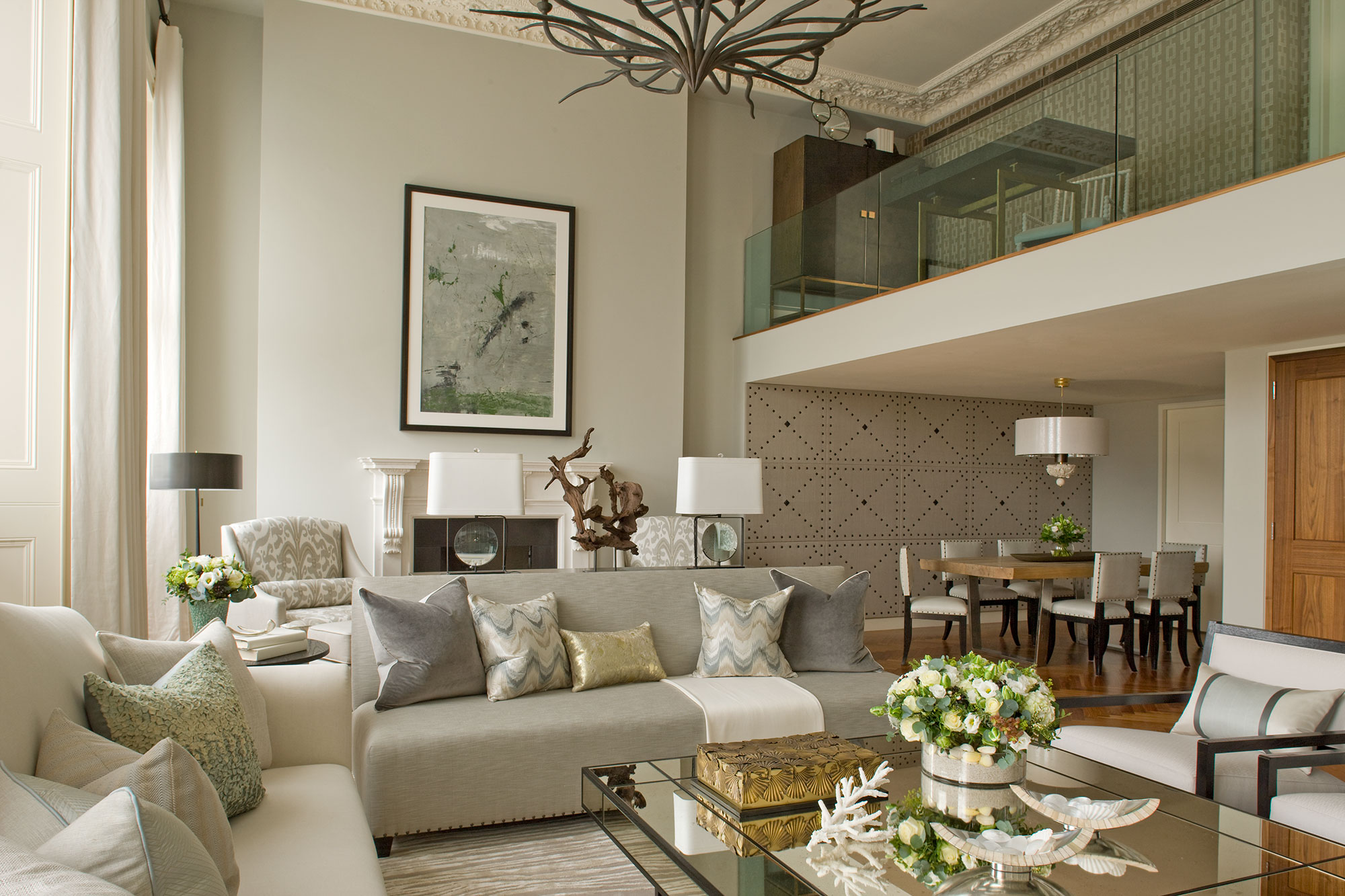
An interior at The Lancasters

The building underwent significant redevelopment. It was completely demolished behind the French Renaissance style façade, which was retained in one of the longest façade development projects in Europe.

It took almost 11 months and 500 tons of steel to support the entire 407 ft. long façade, which is the equivalent length of 15 AEC Routemaster buses end-to-end.

The Lancasters is considered to be the first super prime development in W2 and commands premium prices throughout the building. The scheme which incorporates private residential accommodation was a joint venture between the investment and development company Minerva and developer Northacre Plc. It is now entirely owned by Northacre Plc.

It was designed by Nilsson Architects and built by Capita Symonds.

== Location ==
The building is located in Bayswater area of London, adjacent to Hyde Park. It sits between the Lancaster Gate and Queensway Underground stations on the Central line, taking up the length of block between Leinster Terrace and Lancaster Gate. The address is: The Lancasters, 75–89 Lancaster Gate, London W2 3NH.
