= Pike's Stockade =

- U.S. National Register of Historic Places
- U.S. National Historic Landmark
- Colorado State Register of Historic Properties
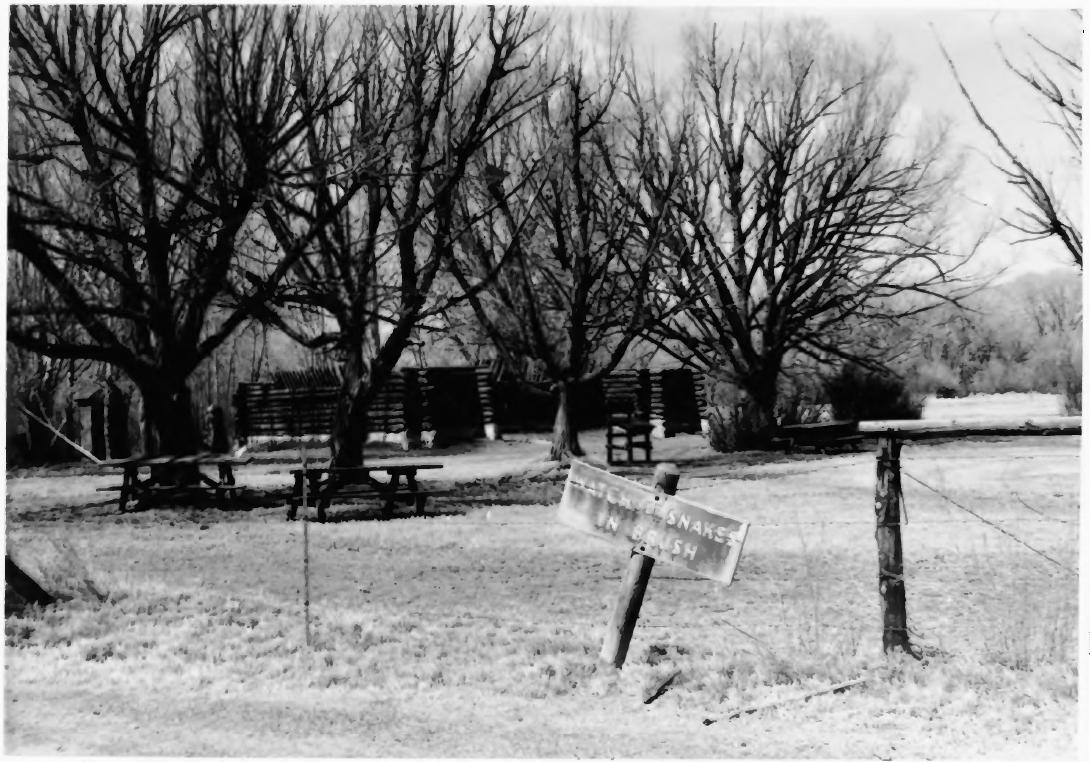
- Reproduction of the fort, 2009

- Location within Colorado Location within the United States
- Nearest city: Sanford, Colorado
- Coordinates: 37°17′37.07″N 105°48′35.8″W
- Area: 4 acres (1.6 ha)
- Built: 1807
- Architect: Zebulon Pike
- NRHP reference No.: 66000244
- CSRHP No.: 5CN.75

Significant dates
- Added to NRHP: October 15, 1966
- Designated NHL: July 4, 1961

Pike's Stockade is a historic exploration campsite located near Sanford, Colorado. Set on the north bank of the Conejos River, it is where explorer Zebulon Pike raised the American flag on Spanish soil in 1807. The site, now managed by Historic Colorado, includes a reconstruction of a wooden stockade, built according to Pike's detailed description of the original. The site was declared a National Historic Landmark in 1961.

== Description and history ==
Pike's Stockade is located about 8 miles (13 km) northeast of Sanford, at the end of County Road 24 on the northern bank of the Conejos River. Now a small park, the site is now less forested than it was at the time of Pike's expedition. The stockade is a wooden structure, roughly 36 by 36 feet (11 m × 11 m), with bastions at the two northern corners. The stockade is built out of oak, a longer-lasting material than the cottonwood Pike used in 1807. Like Pike's construction, the stockade has no normal doorways, and is entered through a tunnel that passes under one of the walls. In deference to public access, the tunnel is lined in concrete, and the stockade itself is built on a concrete foundation.

Zebulon Pike led one of several exploratory expeditions commissioned by President Thomas Jefferson following the Louisiana Purchase to understand what exactly had been acquired. His expedition left St. Louis in July 1806, and reached this point in January 1807. The fort was built primarily as a defense against attack from the Spanish, on whose territory Pike had (either knowingly or innocently) encroached. On February 26, a force of 100 Spanish cavalry arrived at the fort, and requested that he come to Santa Fe, the territorial capital, to discuss the matter. Pike and his men went with the Spanish force, and were eventually released in July 1807.

== See also ==
- List of National Historic Landmarks in Colorado
- National Register of Historic Places listings in Conejos County, Colorado
