= Lane Hotel (Eugene, Oregon) =

- Palace Hotel
- U.S. National Register of Historic Places
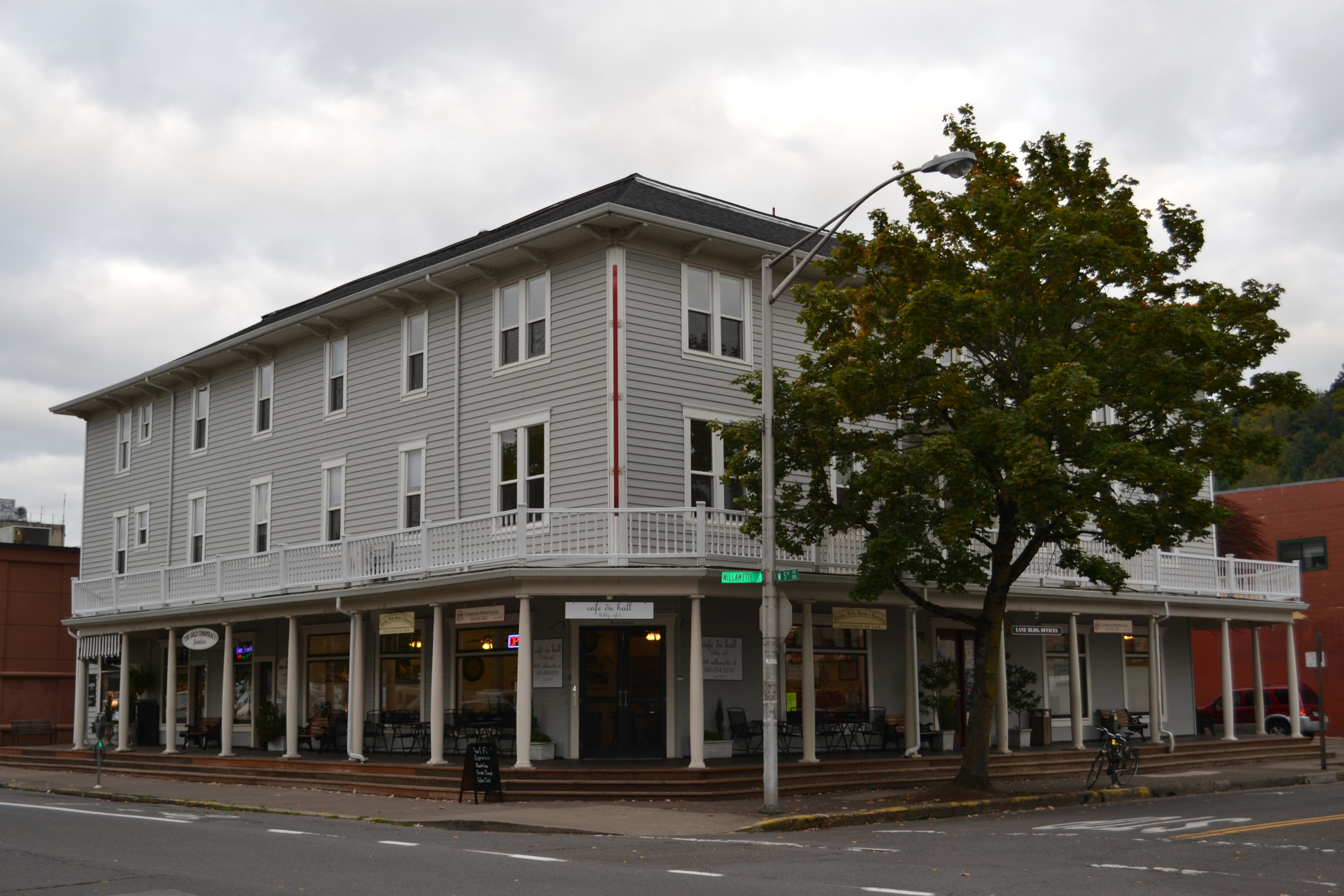
- The building's exterior in 2011

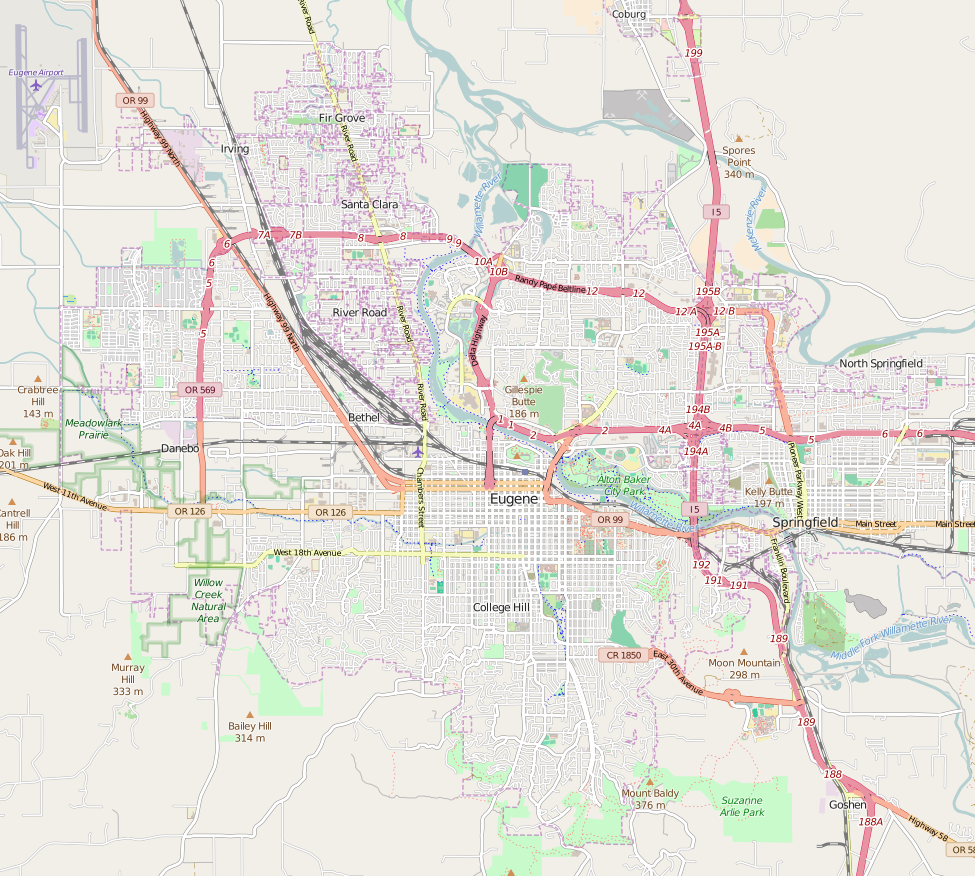
- Location within Eugene OR Location within Oregon
- Location: 488 Willamette Street; Eugene, Oregon
- Coordinates: 44°03′16″N 123°05′35″W
- Area: 10,133 square feet (941.4 m^{2})
- Built: 1903
- Built by: C. McFarland
- Architect: None
- Architectural style: Italianate
- NRHP reference No.: 77001105
- Added to NRHP: December 23, 1977

The Lane Hotel, also known as the Lane Building, is a historic former hotel building in Eugene, Oregon, United States.

The hotel was added to the National Register of Historic Places in 1977, under its then-current name Palace Hotel.

Opened as the Gross Hotel, and later named Griggs and Palace, the building was used as a hotel until 1978. It was known as the Lane Hotel for 50 years. Today the building houses a variety of offices and small businesses.

== See also ==
- National Register of Historic Places listings in Lane County, Oregon
