= Northacre =

Property company of the United Kingdom

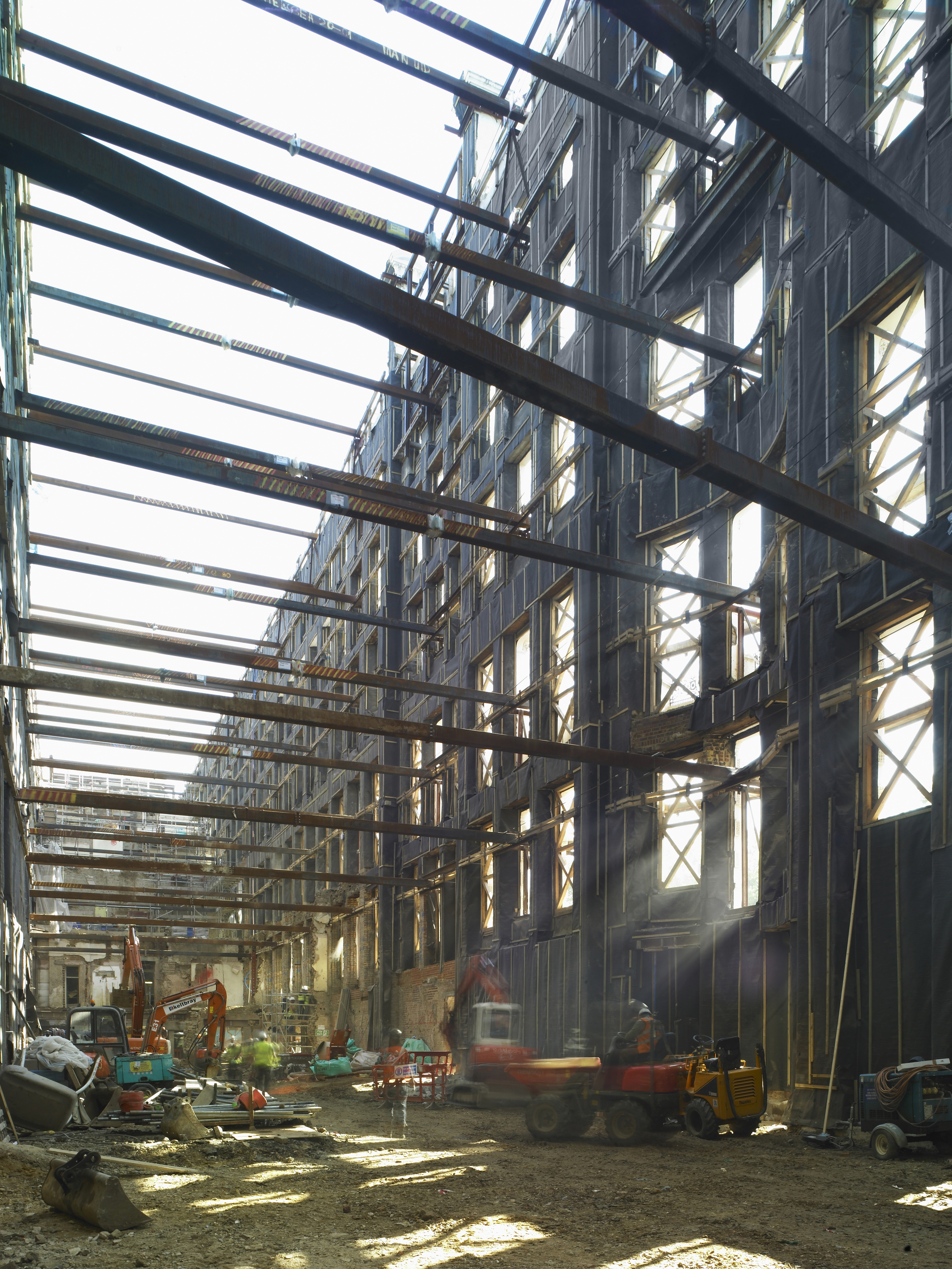
Facade retention work at The Lancasters, Bayswater, London

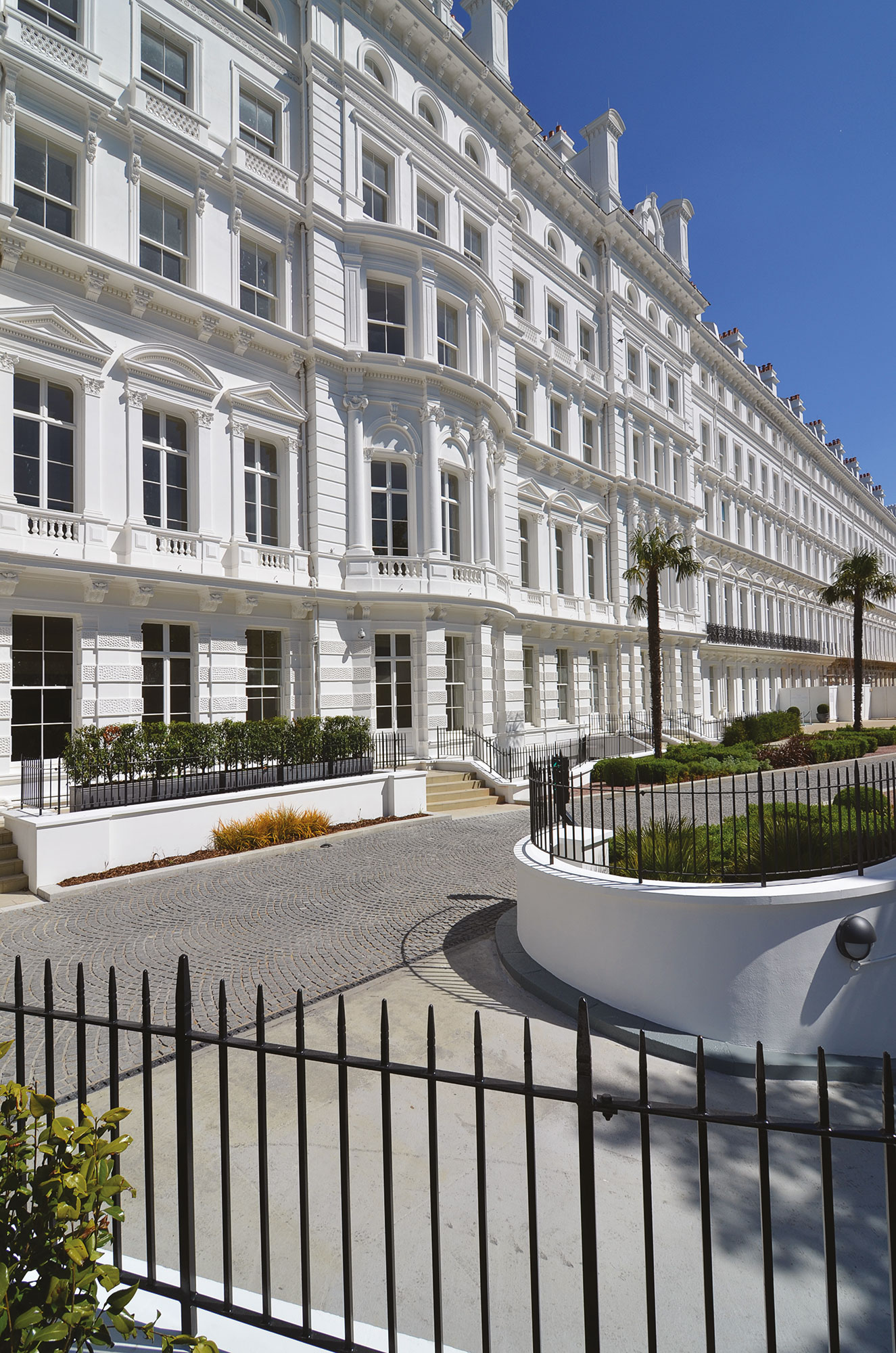
The Lancasters

Northacre plc is a British property company that develops luxury apartments in London, and is 69% owned by Abu Dhabi Financial Group (ADFG).

== History ==
Northacre was founded in 1977 by the Swedish architect Klas Nilsson, with Nilsson Architects, which he founded in 1975, becoming a wholly owned subsidiary. As of 2015, he is the non-executive chairman.

Abu Dhabi Financial Group (ADFG) acquired 68.84% of Northacre, which it owns via Spadille Limited, a Jersey-registered investment vehicle.

== Developments ==
Northacre owns The Lancasters, a development of 77 apartments in Bayswater, which was originally a terrace of 15 stucco-fronted Grade-II listed mid-nineteenth houses.

Northacre has submitted plans to redevelop New Scotland Yard, the Metropolitan Police headquarters, which was bought by ADFG in December 2014 for £370 million, into luxury apartments.
