= La Jara Depot =

- U.S. National Register of Historic Places
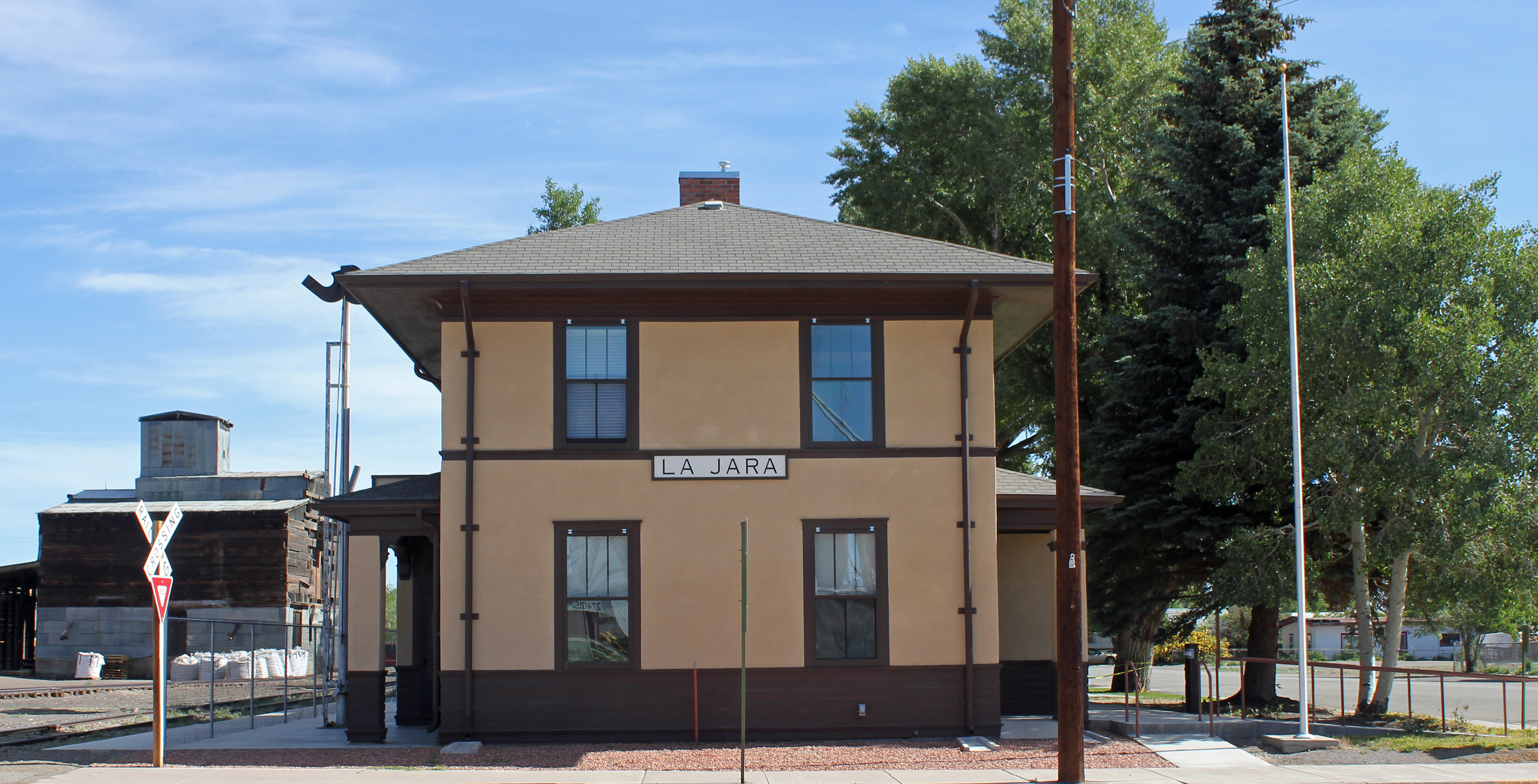

- Location within Colorado
- Location: Broadway and Main Sts., La Jara, Colorado
- Coordinates: 37°16′31″N 105°57′35″W
- Area: 0.3 acres (0.12 ha)
- Built: 1911
- Architectural style: Prairie School
- NRHP reference No.: 75000503
- Added to NRHP: May 12, 1975

The La Jara Depot, at Broadway and Main Sts. in La Jara, Colorado, was built in 1911. It was listed on the National Register of Historic Places in 1975.

It was a railroad depot of the Denver & Rio Grande Western Railroad.

It is unusual architecturally as a 1911 public building for its early reflection of Prairie School architecture and the influence of Frank Lloyd Wright.

It has also been known as the La Jara Town Hall.
