= Otto Dreyer =

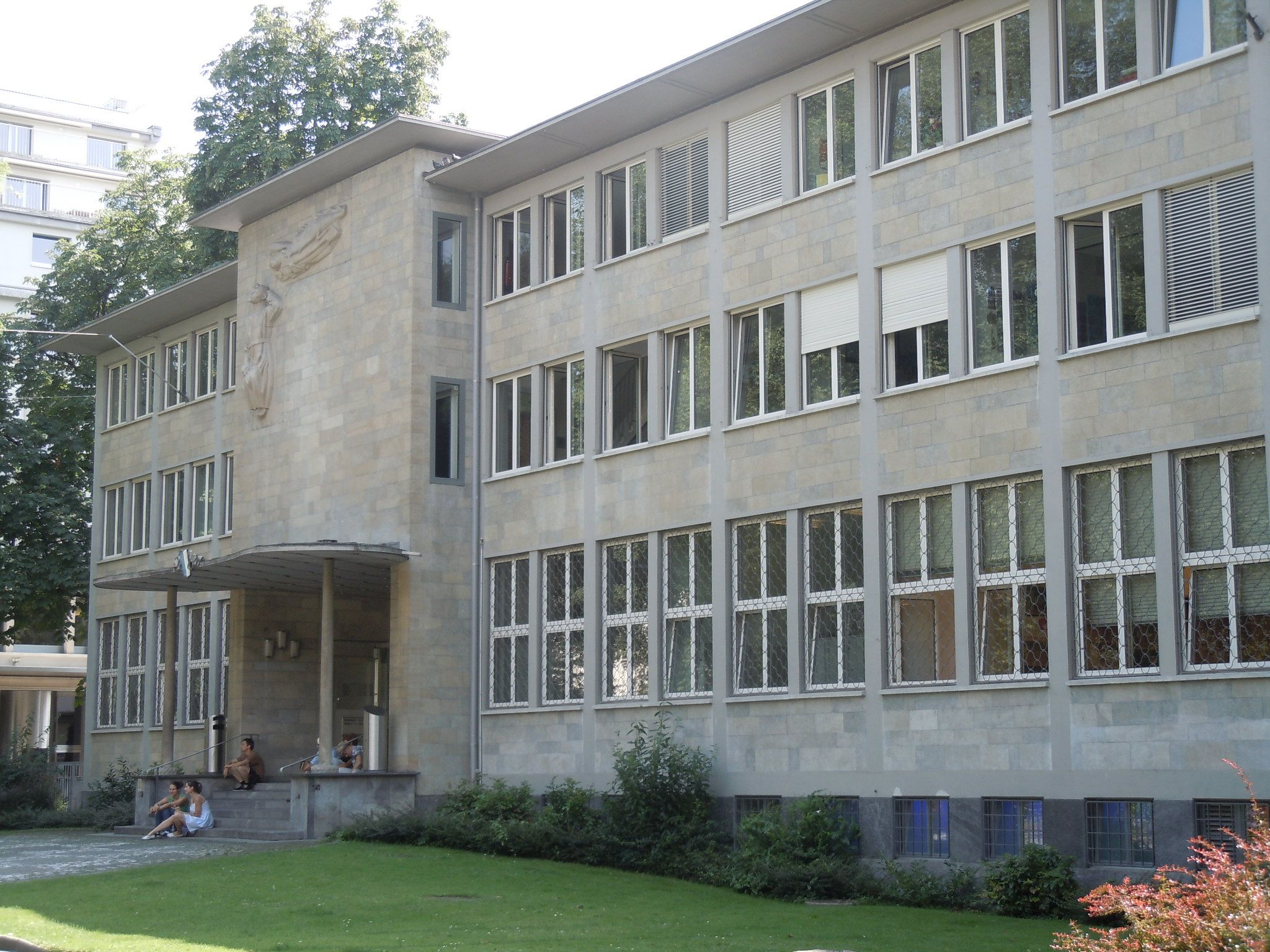
Facade of the Lucerne Central Library, 1951

Otto Dreyer (April 25, 1897, Lucerne – November 18, 1972, Lucerne) was a Swiss architect.

== Biography ==
Dreyer began his studies at ETH Zurich in 1914 and obtained his diploma in 1919. In parallel, from 1914 to 1918, he completed his military service, finishing as an artillery officer. Over the following two years, he expanded his knowledge in Berlin under Bruno Möhring, then spent a year in Paris with Jean Pelée de Saint-Maurice, and undertook study trips to Italy.

Upon returning to Lucerne, he worked as an assistant at Armin Meili's firm from 1924 to 1927 before establishing his own office. In 1958, he partnered with Hans Käppeli, who continued to run the office after Dreyer's death.

Dreyer worked in church architecture. As a founding member of the Swiss St. Luke Society for Art and Church, he constructed a total of nine churches and chapels. His first work in 1924 was a design for a concrete church exhibited in Basel. He won third place in the Switzerland-wide competition for the parish church of St. Karl. He then built the Catholic church of St. Theodul in Littau (1938) and, one of his major works, St. Josef in Lucerne's Maihof district (1940). During the Second World War, he built the Catholic church Guthirt in Aarburg (1941–1942) and in the 1950s the Bruderklauskirche in Kriens (1952–1953).

His main work is the Lucerne Central Library, originally designed for a building site next to the Jesuit Church, the current location in the Hirschmatt quarter was found after a petition to keep the side façade free.

Dreyer supported and preserved the municipal collection of old musical instruments in Tribschen, he was on the organising committee of the International Musical Festival Weeks until 1965 and on the working committee of the Lucerne Conservatory.

== Selected works ==
- Stocker-Dreyer House, Lucerne, 1928
- Martha Flüeler-Häfeli House, Lucerne, 1928
- Labhart House, Lucerne, 1929
- Paulusheim, Lucerne, 1933
- St. Theodul, Catholic Church, Littau (now Lucerne), 1938–1939
- Otto Dreyer House, St. Niklausen (now Horw), 1939
- Landi-Hotel Swiss National Exhibition, Zurich, 1939 (demolished)
- St. Josef, Catholic Church, Lucerne, 1940
- Guthirt, Catholic Church, Aarburg, 1941–1942
- Central Library, Lucerne, 1951
- Bruderklaus Church, Kriens, 1952–1953
- Main Building, Swiss Museum of Transport, 1st Phase, 1959 (with Hans Käppeli)
