= Palace Hotel, Rostov-on-Don =

Palace Hotel
- Палас-отель
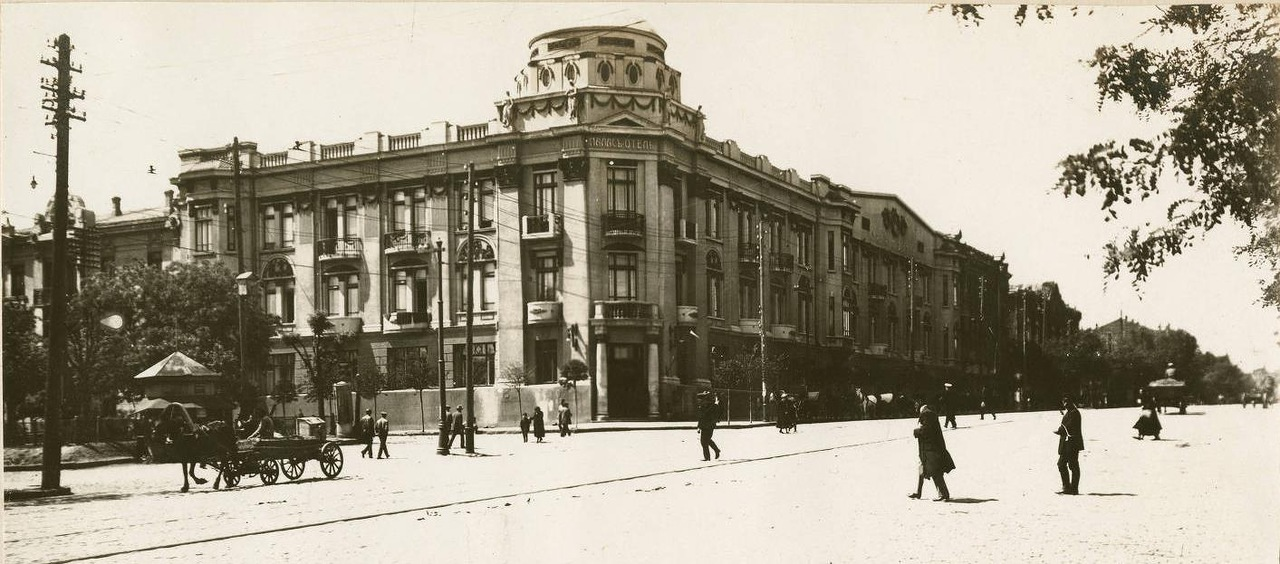
- Interactive map of the Palace Hotel area

General information
- Type: Hotel
- Architectural style: Empire style
- Location: Rostov-on-Don, Russia
- Coordinates: 47°07′57″N 39°25′19″E
- Completed: 1880s

The Palace Hotel (Russian: Палас-отель) is a building in Rostov-on-Don constructed in the 1880s. It is declared as an object of cultural heritage of Russia of regional significance.

== History ==
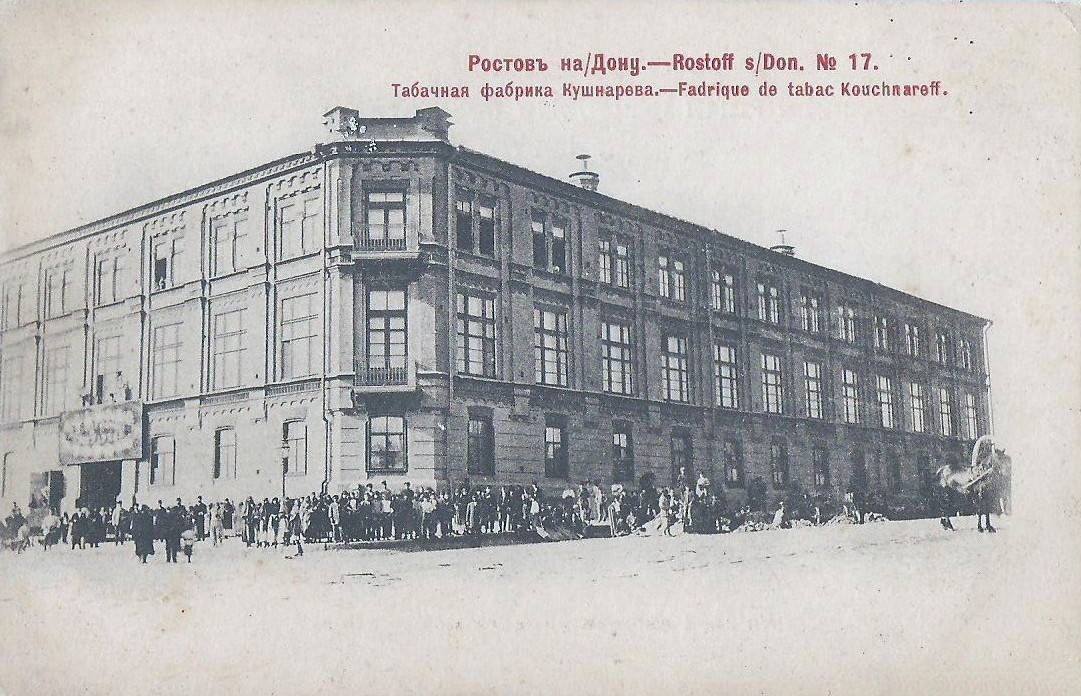
Kushnaryov Tobacco Factory

The three-story building in Rostov-on-Don at the corner of present-day Budennovsky Avenue and Pushkinskaya Street was built in the 1880s for the needs of Kushnaryov Tobacco Factory. In 1914 the "Ya. S. Kushnaryov Partnership" together with Aslanidi Tobacco Factory joins merged with Asmolov Tobacco Factory Enterprise, and so the building on Budennovsky Avenue was rebuilt in 1914-1915 in the Empire architectural style on the project of the Armenian architect Arutyun Khristoforovich Zakiev.

After the restructuring the building was turned into a 1st class hotel. In the center of the hall there was a fountain, and at the entrance to the dining room in a niche was an aquarium with fish, which was included in the restaurant's menu.

The walls in the dining room were painted in light cream colors. The dining hall was meant to host about 800 visitors.

In August 1914, Emperor Nicholas II with his family and heir stopped at the Palace Hotel.

From 23 March to 4 May 1918 the Palace Hotel housed the government of the Don Soviet Republic headed by the leaders of the revolutionary Cossacks Fyodor Podtyolkov and Mikhail Krivoshlykov. When Rostov-on-Don was taken by White forces in May 1918, the hotel again worked here.

On 13 June 1919 in the lobby of the hotel was killed the chairman of Kuban Rada, coroner Nikolai Ryabovol, who advocated the independence of the Kuban and its separation from Russia, with the subsequent refusal to participate in the Civil War. The killer in officer's straps shot him twice in the back and disappeared.

In 1920 the hotel housed the headquarters of the 1st Cavalry Army, and later the headquarters of the North Caucasian Military District.

By now the building has been rebuilt, two floors have been built on. Now the building is occupied by Southern regional department of legal support of the Ministry of Defence of the Russian Federation.
