= Abu Dhabi Financial Group =

Investment management group

ADFG
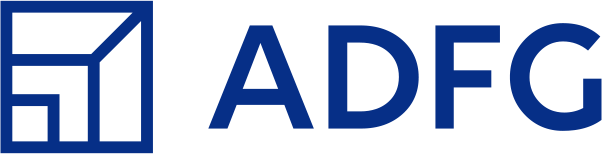
- Industry: Financial services Investment management
- Founded: 2011
- Headquarters: Abu Dhabi, United Arab Emirates
- Key people: Jassim Alseddiqi (CEO)
- Services: Alternative investments, asset management, debt investments and real estate development
- AUM: US $6 billion (2018)
- Subsidiaries: Northacre, Integrated Alternative Finance, Etihad REIT, ADCORP
- Website: www.adfg.ae

Abu Dhabi Financial Group (ADFG) is a global investment management group, headquartered in Abu Dhabi, UAE.

== History ==
Founded in 2011, ADFG is headquartered in Abu Dhabi's Abu Dhabi Global Markets (ADGM), with offices in Dubai, London, Eastern Europe, Saudi Arabia and Egypt. Since 2011, the company has evolved and expanded into an integrated financial services platform under the ADFG Group, branching out to cover four key areas: public markets, private markets, debt investments and real estate. The company is also involved in technology investments.

By 2018, ADFG's assets under management had grown to more than US$6 billion. ADFG formed the Middle East's first dedicated secondaries-focused private equity fund – the ADCM Secondary Private Equity Fund - targeted towards acquiring interests in MENA-based funds.

A year later, in 2012, ADFG launched the listed private equity fund Qannas Investment Limited through a flotation on London Stock Exchange's Alternative Investment Market. This was the first ‘cash shell’ arrangement by a Middle Eastern company.

== Private markets ==
ADFG's investments in private equity are focused primarily on the GCC but it also seeks opportunities in the wider MENA region and beyond. Typical ticket size is between $50 million and $300 million, usually targeting an Internal Rate of Return of 20 percent or more. Key sectors for investment include financial services and real estate. In November 2016, ADFG completed the acquisition of a 48.36 percent stake in Dubai-based financial services firm Shuaa Capital from Dubai Group. Shuaa Capital returned to profit in 2017, recording its highest full-year profit since 2007. ADFG also founded ADCorp, the first Islamic financial institution based in Abu Dhabi Global Market with a funding round raising over $101M in 2018.

== Public markets ==
ADFG invests in public markets across equities and fixed income and participates in both primary offerings and secondary markets. Examples of its investments include stakes in Bahraini investment bank, GFH Financial Group, and Sharjah-based energy group, Dana Gas.

=== Technology ===
In April 2018, ADFG took a strategic stake in 500 Startups, the Silicon Valley venture capital fund to complement its existing technology initiatives. At the time, ADFG said it would be injecting substantial capital to accelerate the growth of 500's key initiatives, expand into new markets, and anchor future global funds.

== Debt investments ==
ADFG's debt platform, Integrated Alternative Finance (IAF), operates primarily in the UAE and London markets. With strong links to financial institutions and alternative lenders, including ADFG itself, the platform has access to capital that can be structured to specific corporate or project circumstances. In addition, the platform also provides on-going monitoring and management of debt investments on behalf of investors. IAF provides alternative financing and structuring solutions to asset owners and developers for acquisition, restructuring, refinancing or development projects. Regulated by the Dubai Financial Services Authority, IAF's primary focus is in the real estate sector and is particularly targeting expansion in Saudi Arabia, the UAE and Egypt. To date, IAF has arranged finance totaling approximately US$3 billion, with a blended overall return of 15%.

== Real estate ==
=== UK ===
ADFG owns Northacre, a developer of luxury property in central London. Northacre has designed, developed and marketed over £2.2 billion of prime residential developments in London over its 25-year history, with projects including The Broadway (formerly New Scotland Yard), No 1. Palace Street, Lucan Place and the Lancasters in Hyde Park.

In 2017, Niccolò Barattieri di San Pietro, Northacre's chief executive, commented that “London will continue to hold its dominant and stable position as the No 1 city for investors” in real estate. ADFG also owns No.1 Palace Street, situated adjacent to Buckingham Palace which will comprise 72 luxury apartments, restaurant and health and fitness facilities within its 300,000+ square feet once completed.

=== Eastern Europe ===
In September 2015, ADFG officially opened the landmark commercial and residential investment project in Montenegro, The Capital Plaza. The opening ceremony was attended by a large number of high-ranking officials, dignitaries, and diplomats, including H.E. Milo Đukanović, Prime Minister of Montenegro; H.E. Abdulhamid Saeed, managing director of Capital Investment; and H.E. Hafsa Al Ulama, UAE Ambassador to Montenegro.

=== Middle East ===
Etihad REIT is a UAE-based Sharia-compliant Real Estate Investment Trust established and incorporated under the laws of ADGM. Launched in 2016, it has a mixed-use portfolio of assets across the UAE. In 2018, ADFG entered into a Memorandum of Understanding with Jabal Omar Development Company.

== See also ==
- Emaar Properties
