= Sanford, Colorado =

Town in Conejos County, Colorado, United States

Town of Sanford, Colorado
- Town
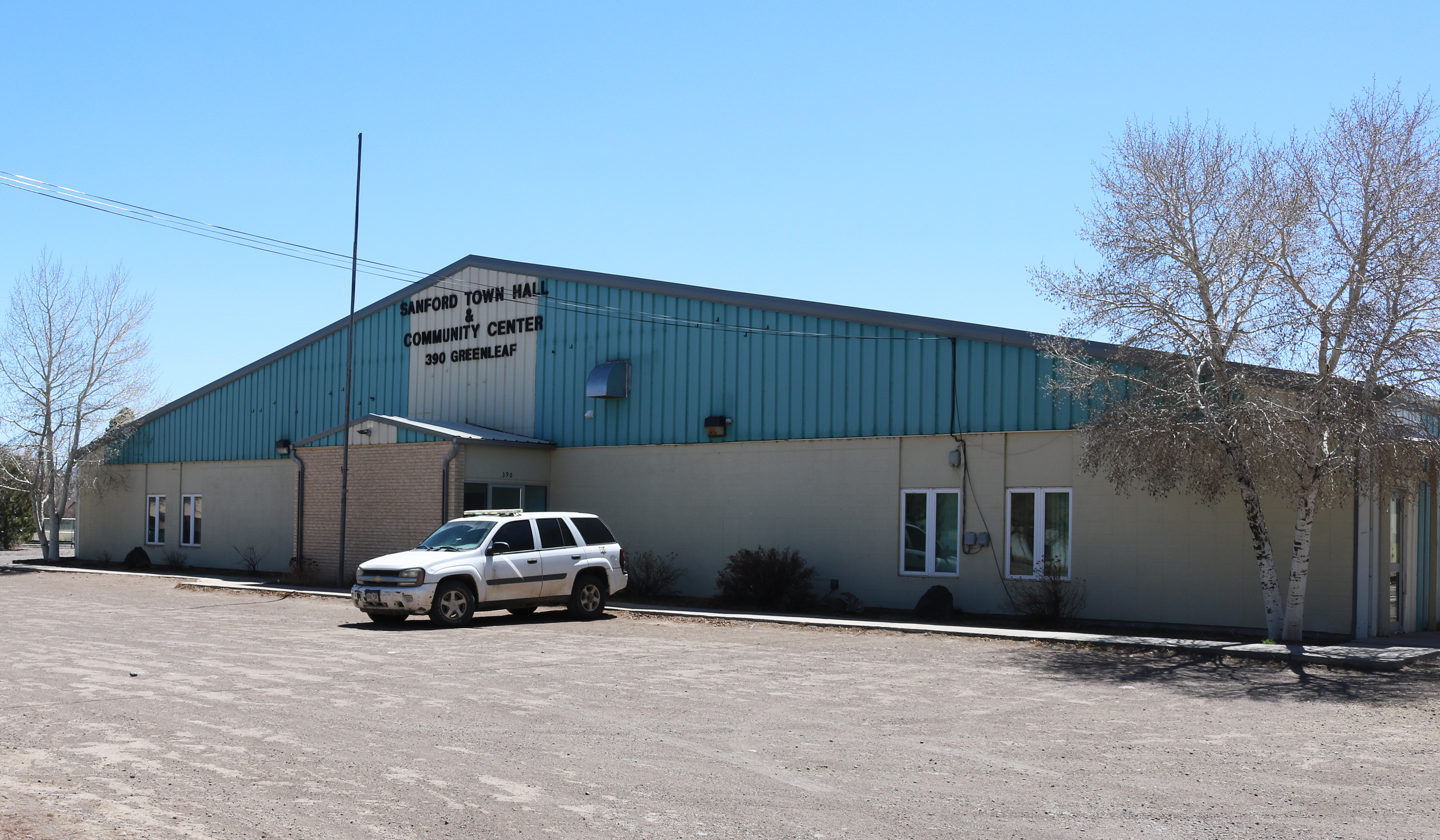
- The town hall and community center on Greenleaf Street.

- Location of Sanford in Conejos County, Colorado.
- Coordinates: 37°15′25″N 105°54′02″W
- Country: United States
- State: State of Colorado
- County: Conejos County
- Incorporated: April 9, 1907

Government
  - Type: Statutory Town

Area
  - Total: 1.46 sq mi (3.78 km^{2})
  - Land: 1.46 sq mi (3.78 km^{2})
  - Water: 0 sq mi (0.00 km^{2})
- Elevation: 7,599 ft (2,316 m)

Population (2020)
  - Total: 879
  - Density: 602/sq mi (233/km^{2})
- Time zone: UTC-7 (MST)
  - Summer (DST): UTC-6 (MDT)
- ZIP code: 81151
- Area code: 719
- FIPS code: 08-67830
- GNIS feature ID: 2413256
- Website: townofsanford.colorado.gov

Sanford is a statutory town in Conejos County, Colorado, United States. The population was 879 at the 2020 census.

A post office called Sanford has been in operation since 1888. The town was named after Silas Sanford Smith, a Mormon pioneer.

== History ==
Some of the settlers who established Sanford were Catawba people from South Carolina who had converted to Mormonism.

== Geography ==
Sanford is located in northeastern Conejos County in the San Luis Valley of southern Colorado. The town of La Jara is 3 miles (5 km) to the west by State Highway 136.

According to the United States Census Bureau, the town has a total area of 1.5 square miles (3.8 km^{2}), all of it land.

== Demographics ==
Historical population
Census	Pop.	Note	%±
1910	564		—
1920	555		−1.6%
1930	597		7.6%
1940	736		23.3%
1950	666		−9.5%
1960	679		2.0%
1970	638		−6.0%
1980	687		7.7%
1990	750		9.2%
2000	817		8.9%
2010	879		7.6%
2020	879		0.0%

== See also ==
- List of municipalities in Colorado
- Pike's Stockade
- San Luis Valley
