= Palace Hotel (Antonito, Colorado) =

- U.S. National Register of Historic Places
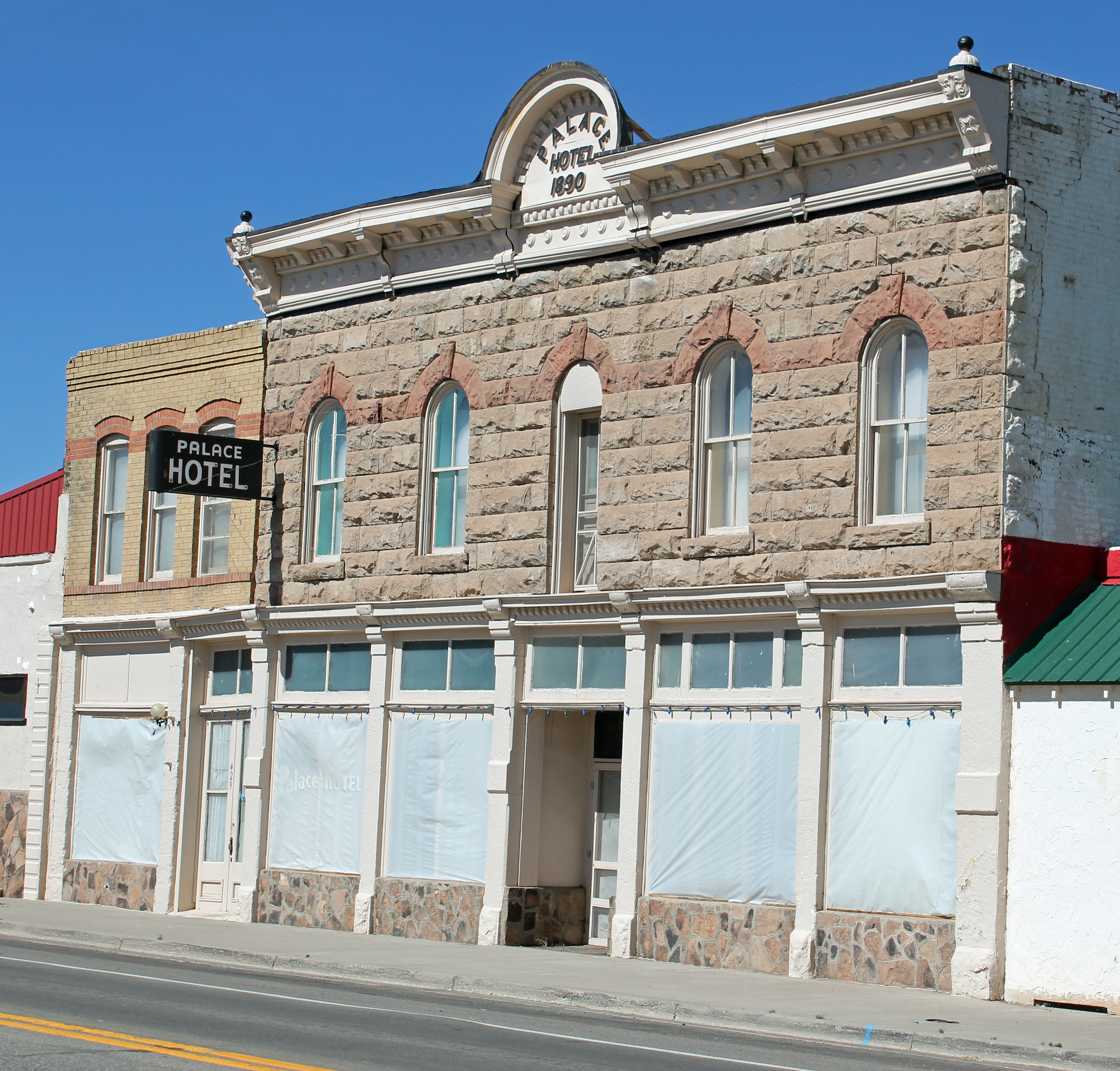

- Location within Colorado
- Location: 429 Main St., Antonito, Colorado
- Coordinates: 37°04′35″N 106°00′30″W
- Area: less than one acre
- Built: 1890
- Architectural style: Late 19th and Early 20th Century American Movements
- NRHP reference No.: 94001013
- Added to NRHP: August 19, 1994

The Palace Hotel, at 429 Main St. in Antonito, Colorado, was built in 1890. It was listed on the National Register of Historic Places in 1994.

It is a two-story building constructed of sandstone.
